= Shomrei Emunim =

Hasidic group

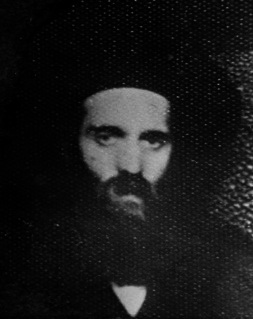
Rabbi Ahrele Roth

Shomrei Emunim (Hebrew: שומרי אמונים, meaning "Guardians of the Faithful") is a devout, insular Hasidic group based in Jerusalem. It was founded in the 20th century by Rabbi Arele (Aharon) Roth.

The Shomrei Emunim are characterized by fervent and visibly emotional prayer, and by a rigid lifestyle controlled largely by "takanos", decrees written by the Rebbe. One such decree, for example, forbade wearing wool. (Jewish law forbids wearing anything that contains both wool and linen. Rabbi Aharon worried that it would be safest not to wear wool at all, in order to avoid the possibility of violating the law altogether.)

== Dynastical history and divide ==
Grand Rabbi Aharon Roth, or Reb Arele (as his Hasidim sometimes call him, affectionately), was known to pray especially fervently. According to one story, he regularly had to change his clothes twice during the Sabbath morning service. While the normal service might be two or three hours long, Rabbi Aharon frequently drew the service out for five or more hours.

Rabbi Aharon was known to be very anti-Zionist, and many of his Hasidim today continue that tradition, particularly the Toldos Aharon and Toldos Avrohom Yitzchok groups. They owe their strong opinions on Zionism to the literal reading of the Talmud's proclamation that Jews should not take over the Holy Land prior to the coming of the Messiah. For more information about this subject, see Three Oaths; compare also Satmar's opposition to Zionism. While Rabbi Aharon's opposition to Zionism predated the publication of the Satmar rebbe Joel Teitelbaum's book Vayoel Moshe, Teitelbaum's and Rabbi Aharon's reasoning for opposing Zionism are similar, if not identical.

When Rabbi Aharon died, his son and his son-in-law both became rebbes in their own right. The dynastic chain:

- Rebbe Aharon "Reb Areleh" Roth (d. 1946) - author of Shomer Emunim, Shulchan HaTahor, and Taharas HaKodesh - founding Rebbe of Shomrei Emunim dynasty in the town of Satmar, Hungary, and Jerusalem.
  - Rebbe Avrohom Chaim Roth - (d. 2012) Shomrei Emunim Rebbe in Jerusalem and Bnei Brak - son of "Reb Areleh" Roth.
  - Rebbe Avrohom Yitzchok Kahn (d. 1996) - author of Divrei Emunah - previous Toldos Aharon Rebbe of Jerusalem - son-in-law of "R' Areleh" Roth.
    - Rebbe Shmuel Yaakov Kahn - present Toldos Avrohom Yitzchok Rebbe in Jerusalem - eldest son of the previous Toldos Aharon Rebbe.
    - Rebbe Dovid Kahn - present Toldos Aharon Rebbe in Jerusalem - son of the previous Toldos Aharon Rebbe.

=== Shomrei Emunim group ===
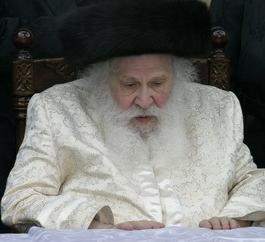
Rabbi Avraham Chaim Roth, second Rebbe of Shomrei Emunim

Rabbi Aharon's son, Rabbi Avrohom Chaim Roth, inherited Rabbi Arele's shul in Jerusalem and the name and title "Shomer Emunim", and become Rebbe and Rabbi Arele's successor, recognized as such by the Belzer Rebbe and Rabbi Shlomke of Zvhil.

Approximately ten years after becoming Shomrei Emunim Rebbe, Rabbi Aharon's son also opened a second shul in Bnei Brak, and today, he divides his time between Jerusalem and Bnei Brak, as well as occasional visits to his shul in Ashdod (headed by the Rebbe's son Rabbi Aharon Roth, the Shomrei Emunim Rov) and to Tifrach.

The Shomrei Emunim Rebbe has four sons who are involved in Shomrei Emunim, and five sons-in-law, all of whom are rebbes in their own right.

The Shomer Emunim group is more moderate than the Toldos Aharon - Toldos Avrohom Yitzchok sects, and is informally affiliated with Agudat Yisrael. The Rebbe himself does not vote, but he encourages his Hasidim to.

=== Toldos Aharon and Toldos Avrohom Yitzchok groups ===
Rabbi Aharon's son-in-law, Rabbi Avrohom Yitzchok Kohn, adopted the name Toldos Aharon "Generations of Aharon". Most of Reb Arele's followers left to follow the son-in-law, Rabbi Kohn. Toldos Aharon and Toldos Avrohom Yitzchok are strongly anti-Zionist.

== Hasidic books of the Shomer Emunim, Toldos Aharon, and Toldos Avrohom Yitzchok groups ==
In addition to those books which are revered by all Hasidic Jews, the Toldos Aharon Hasidim particularly revere the books, Shomer Emunim, Shulchan HaTahor, and Taharas HaKodesh, by Rebbe Aharon Roth, and Divrei Emunoh by Rebbe Avrohom Yitzchok Kahn. The version of the prayer book used by Toldos Aharon Hasidim is called Brucheh i'Tehilleh. The Toldos Avrohom Yitzchok Hasidim have published a weekday prayer book called, Tehillas Avrohom Yitzchok, but also use the Brucheh i'Tehilleh version as well.

The previous Rebbe of Toldos Aharon, R' Avrohom Yitzchok, was said to have instructed his followers to learn the works of Rabbi Aharon HaLevi of Staroshelye (pronounced Strashelye), which include "Sha'arei HaYichud VeHaEmunoh", "Sha'arei Avoda", and "Avodas HaLevi". The Staroselyer Rebbe was a follower of the first Rebbe of Chabad, Rabbi Shneur Zalman of Liadi. After the passing of R' Shneur Zalman, R' Aharon HaLevi started his own Hasidic following, an offshoot of Chabad, in Staroselye.

== See also ==
- Kiryat Shomrei Emunim
- Edah HaChareidis
