= Mishkenos HoRoim =

Hasidic group in Mea Shearim, Jerusalem

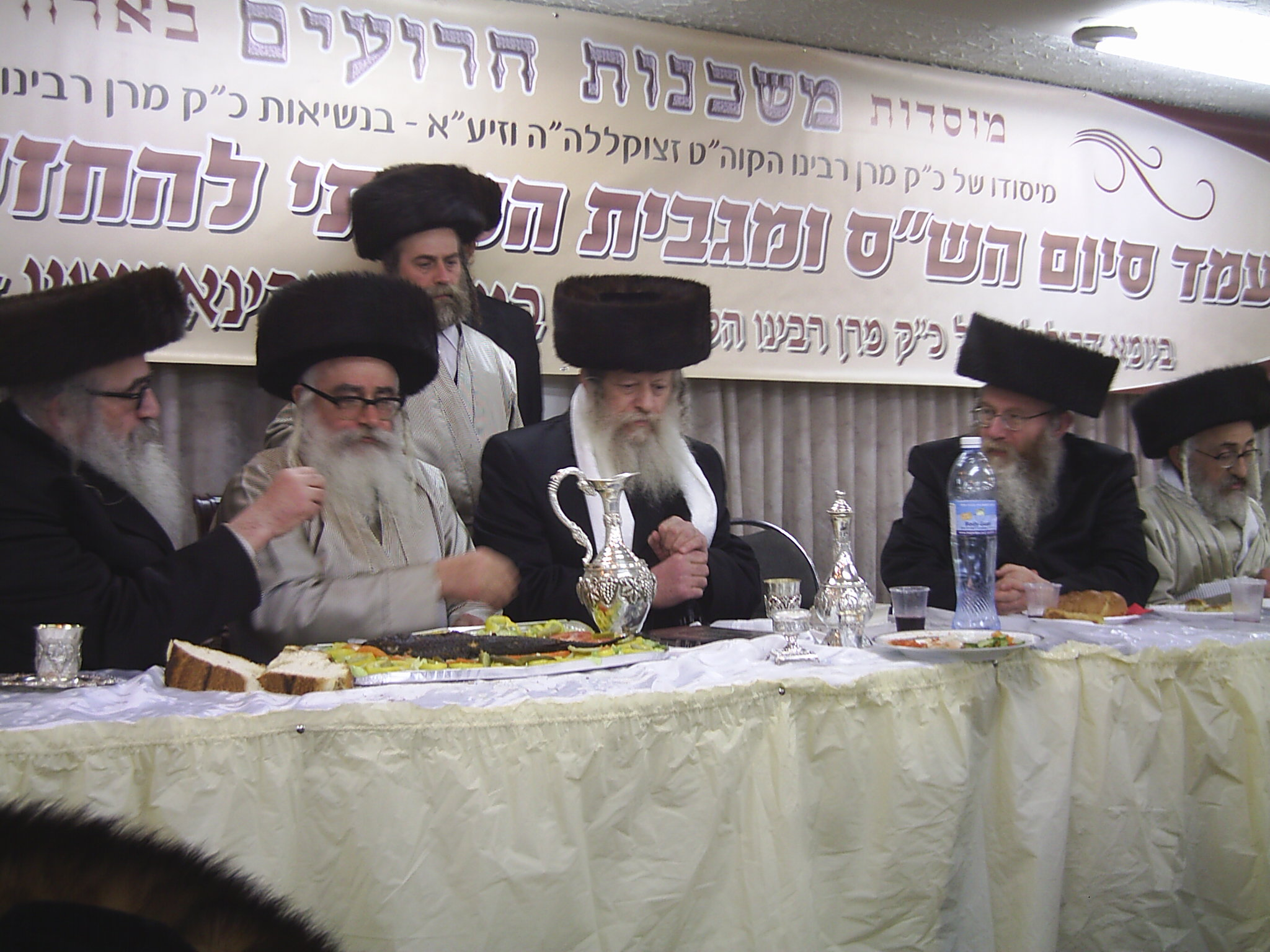
Rebbe of Mishkenos HoRoim (left); Rabbi Avrohom Yitzchok Ulman, middle

Mishkenos HoRoim (Hebrew: משכנות הרועים), also spelled Mishkenot HaRoim and Mishkenois HaRoyim, is a small Hasidic group located in Mea Shearim, Jerusalem. It is known as a very isolated and fervently conservative group, known for its virulent anti-Zionism, even by Haredi standards. Mishkenos HoRoim is also known as Kahal Yereim (Community of the Fearing). The main synagogue is located on Mea Shearim Street. There is also a Mishkenos HoRoim synagogue in Ramat Beit Shemesh Bet.

Speech by (first) the Rebbe of Mishkenos HoRoim; after that (at 12 minutes), by the Chief Rabbi of the Edah HaChareidis, Rabbi Yitzchok Tuvioh Weiss, at a yahrtzeit tish for Rabbi Amram Blau in Mishkenos HoRoim, Jerusalem, July 2008.

The previous Rebbe of Mishkenos HoRoim, Rabbi Binyomin Rabinowitz, was a member of the Badatz (rabbinical court) of the Edah HaChareidis. He has been quoted as saying: "If religious Jews would not co-operate with the Zionists, [the state] would have long been annulled, and the Messiah would have come, and entire delay of the redemption is [attributable to] this matter."
