= HaTekufah HaGedolah =

Hebrew book by Rabbi Menachem Mendel Kasher

HaTekufah HaGedolah (Hebrew: התקופה הגדולה, meaning The Great Epoch) is a two-volume Hebrew book written in 1969 by Rabbi Menachem Mendel Kasher, in which the author argues that Zionism and the State of Israel are consistent with Judaism and mark the beginnings of the messianic Atchalta De'Geulah. The book includes a rebuttal to Vayoel Moshe, the anti-Zionist tract written by Rabbi Joel Teitelbaum.

In a final section, HaTekufah HaGedolah includes an edition of Kol HaTor, a book attributed to a student of the Vilna Gaon, which Rabbi Kasher uses to argue that Gaon himself advocated for an early form of Zionism in his attempt to move to Eretz Israel, and the immigration of his disciples (the Perushim) to the Old Yishuv.

== See also ==
- Three Oaths
- Haredim and Zionism
