= Toldos Aharon =

Anti-Zionist Hasidic group

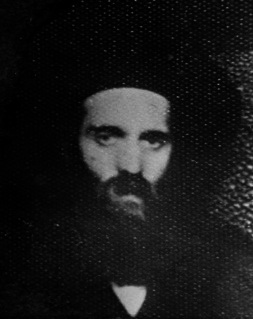
- Rabbi Aharon Roth

Founder
- Rabbi Aharon Roth

Regions with significant populations
- United States, Israel

Religions
- Hasidic Judaism

Toldos Aharon is a devout, insular, fervently anti-Zionist ultra orthodox Hasidic dynasty. The group is characterized by extreme conservatism and a desire to preserve the life of the old Yishuv in Jerusalem, in sharp opposition to Zionism, in a strict Haredi way of life, in a special style of clothing, and in an emphasis on prayer at a moderate pace and with enthusiasm. Headquartered in Jerusalem's Mea Shearim neighborhood, it also has significant numbers in Ramat Beit Shemesh, and New York City, and additional members in Tiberias and in Harish. The sect has about 1,800 households. Toldos Aharon is a split-off from Shomer Emunim. It is led by the current Aharoner Rebbe, Dovid Kohn.

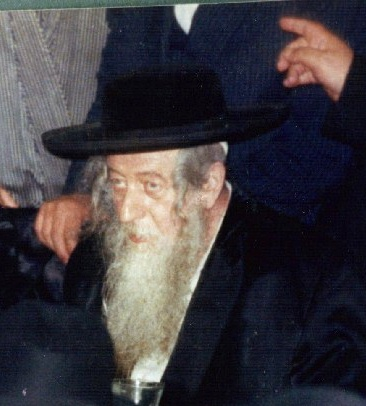
The former Aheroner Rebbe, Avrohom Yitzchok Kohn

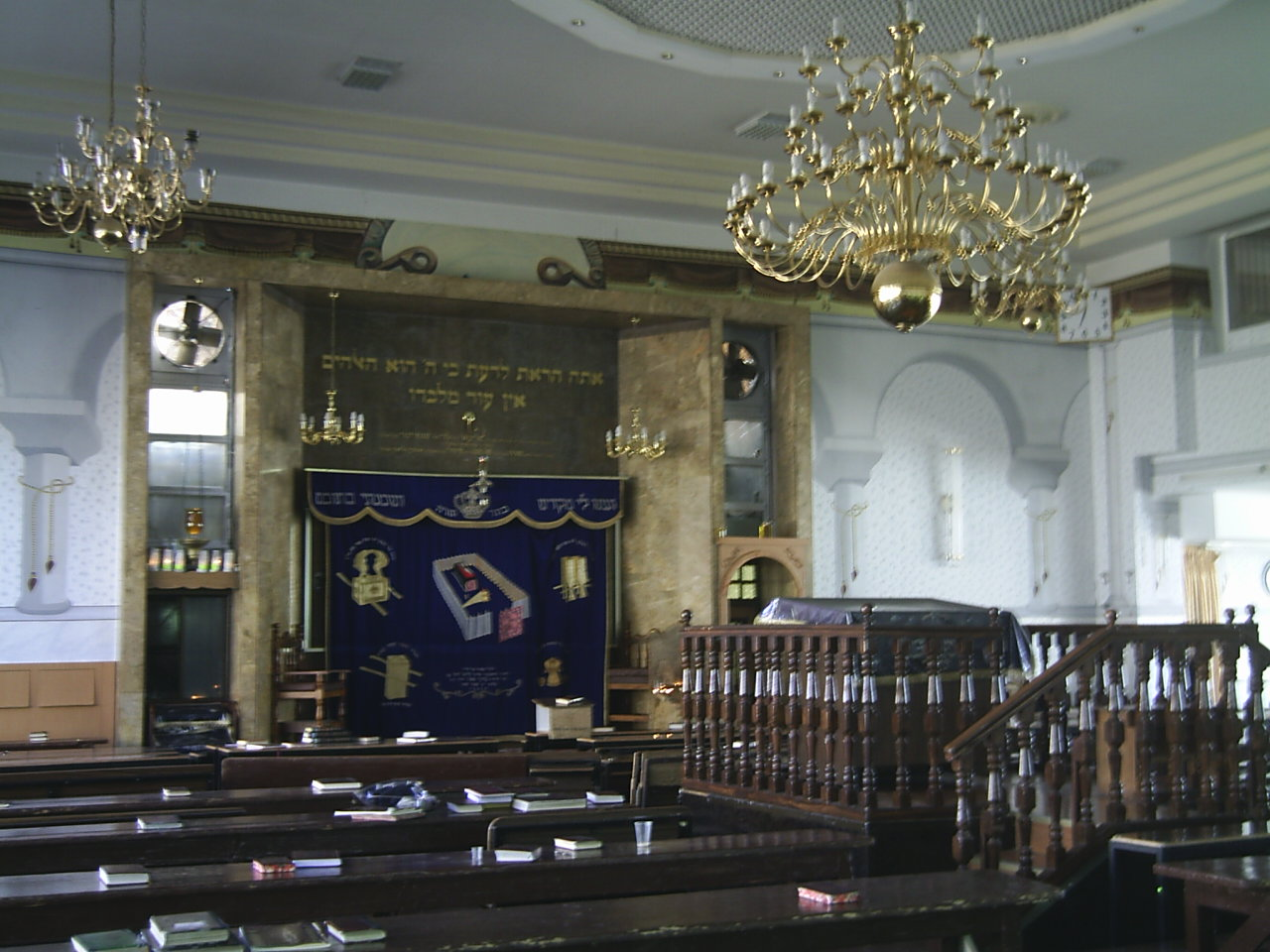
The court's synagogue before renovations

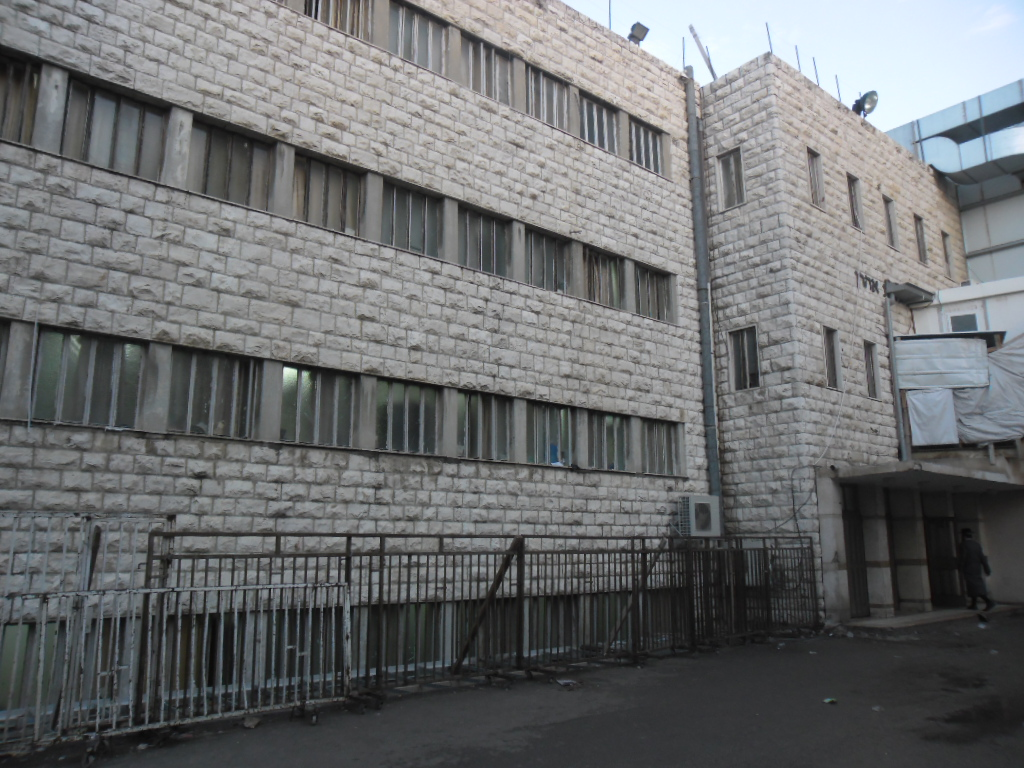
Exterior of the Talmud Torah

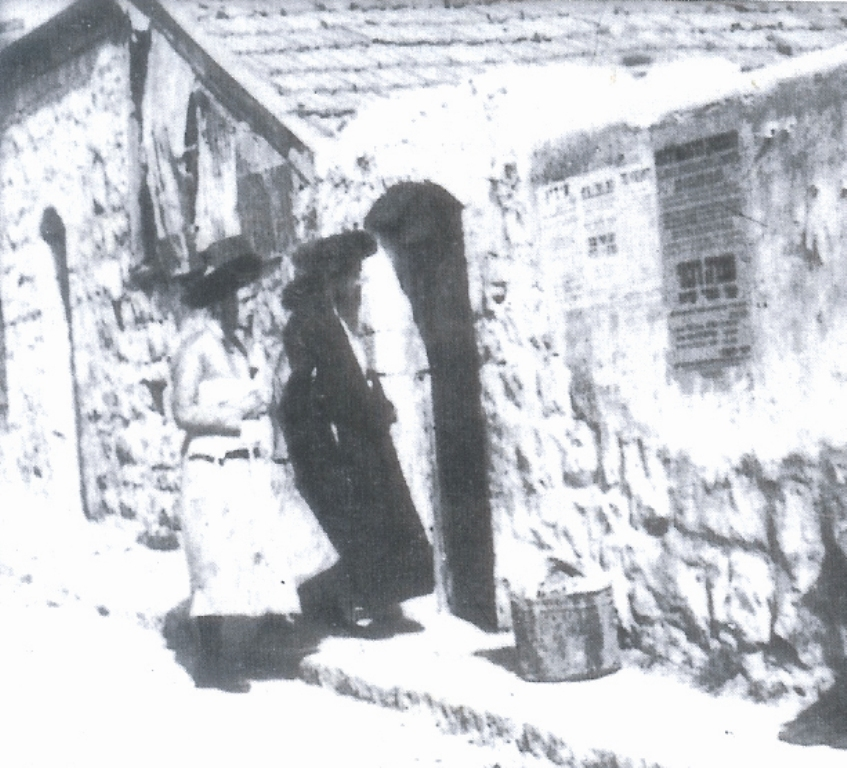
The old yeshiva of Toldos Aharon

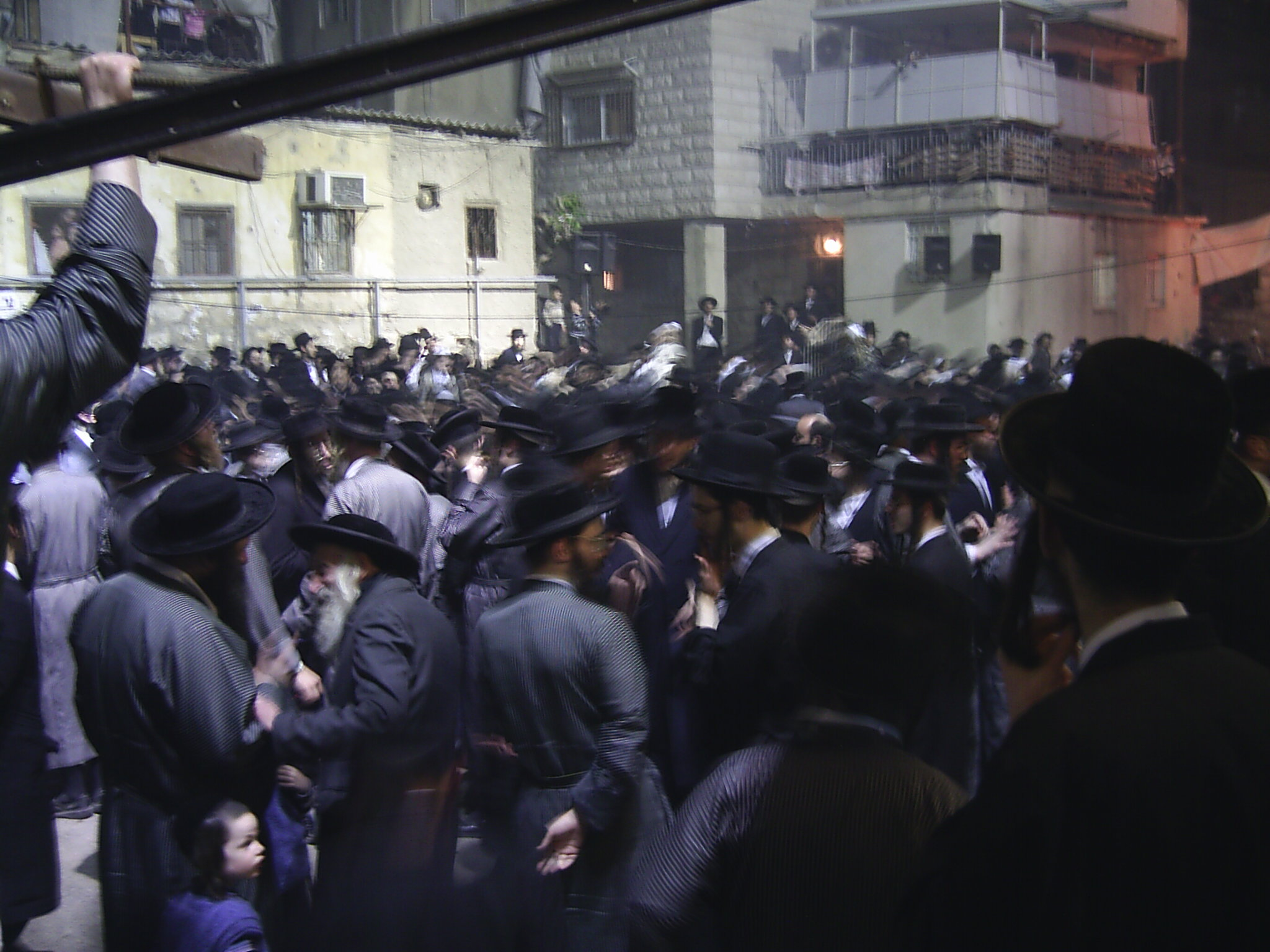
Lighting on Lag BaOmer in the yeshiva courtyard

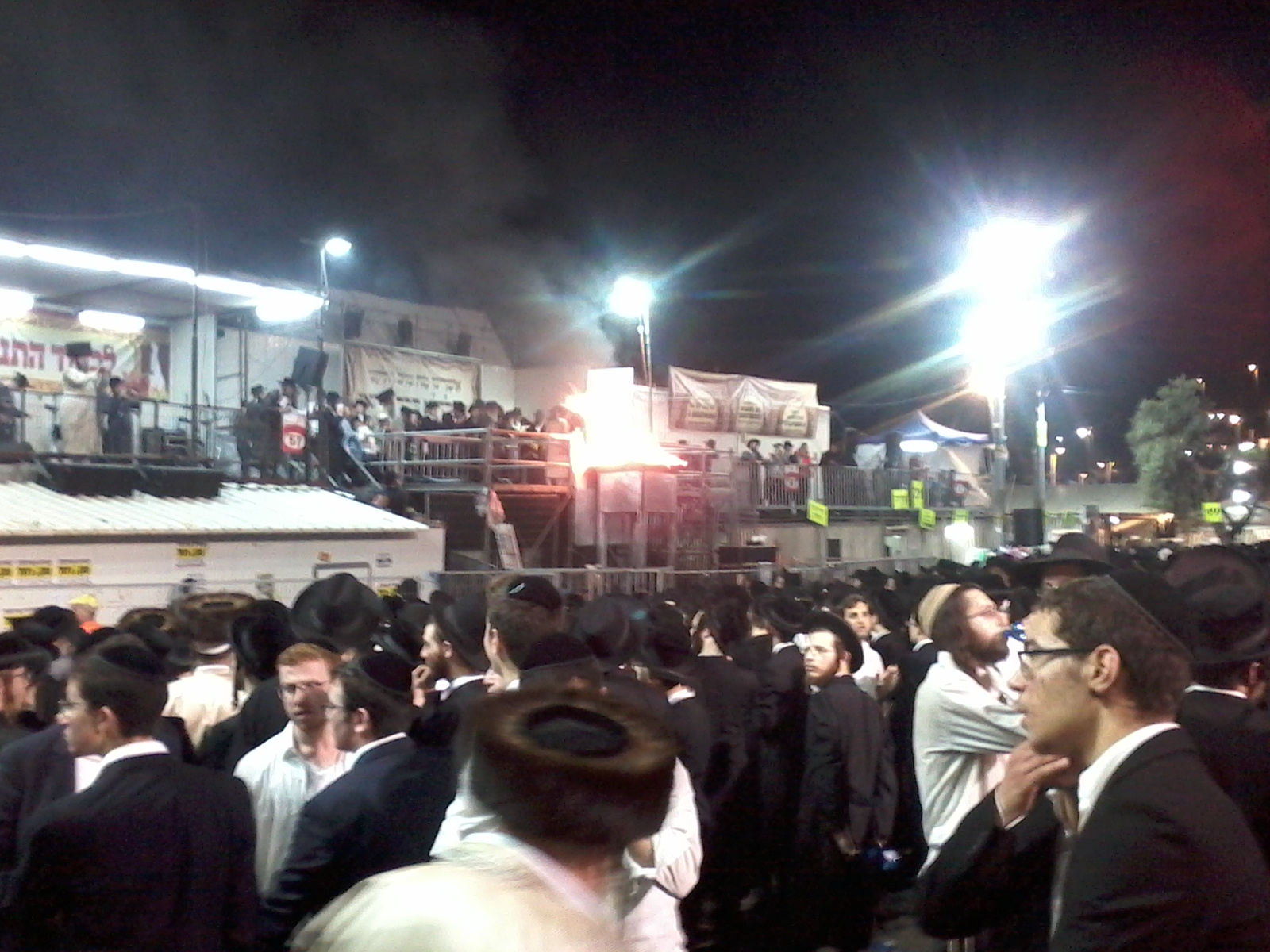
Lighting of the court's bonfire at the site of Rabi Shimon bar Yochai's tomb in Meron, Lag BaOmer, 2017

== History ==
The Chassidus is named after Aharon Roth, who established a group in Satmar in the year 1921, which was characterized by far-reaching criteria for the worship of God. In 1928, Rabbi Roth immigrated to the Land of Israel. Because of the special importance he saw in reciting amen aloud, Roth changed the group's name in 1933 to "Shomer Emunim".

Roth died on 6 Nisan in 1947. About a year later, his students split up, and a relatively small group chose his son, Avraham Chaim Roth, to succeed his father as Rebbe. Most of the students chose Aharon's son-in-law, Avrohom Yitzchok Kohn. He established his court on the outskirts of the Mea She'arim neighborhood (today, stands instead the beth midrash of the Toldos Avrohom dynasty. Rabbi Yoel Teitelbaum of Satmar originally opposed Aharon's approach, but with the rise of Kohn, who was his disciple, to serve as rebbe, there was a rapprochement between the two Hasidic sects.

Avrohom Yitzchok Kohn died during Hanukkah of 1996. Kohn had many sons, four of whom are rebbes today.

=== Accession of the current rebbe ===
At the end of Avrohom Yitzchok Kohn's life, and in the context of two years in which he did not function, there was controversy in the community over who would inherit it. During these years, the institutions of the community found it difficult to function. Most of the members of the community and the administration of its institutions supported Kohn's second son, Dovid, who until then served as rabbi of Toldos Aharon in the town of Monsey, New York. Others favored the eldest son, Shmuel Yaakov, as successor. Among the supporters of the first-born were also the rabbi of the community in Jerusalem and its representative in the beth din of the Edah HaChareidis, Meir Brandsdorfer, and the kabbalist Daniel Frisch.

After Rabbi Kohn died, two of his sons came to an agreement, whereby the younger son, Dovid, from Monsey, New York, inherited the title Aharoner Rebbe title, whereas the eldest son, Shmuel Yaakov, a disciple of the Viznitzer Rebbe, became a Rebbe as well, spawning the Toldos Avrohom dynasty, named after his father. The main beth midrash of Toldos Avrohom Yitzchok is also in Meah Shearim, one block away from the Toldos Aharon building. Both live in Jerusalem. Another son is a rosh yeshiva in Kiryas Joel, New York. The other two sons formed Hasidic courts on their own, both located in Meah Shearim as well, and are known as the Mevakshei Emunah Rebbe and the Nachlas Aharon Rebbe, respectively.

- Aharon "Reb Areleh" Roth (1894–1946) - author of Shomrei Emunim, Shulchan HaTahor, and Taharas HaKodesh - founding Rebbe of Shomrei Emunim dynasty in the town of Satmar, (At that time, Hungary; now, Romania), and Jerusalem.
  - Avrohom Chaim Roth (1924–2012) - author of Chukei Chaim - Shomrei Emumim Rebbe in Jerusalem and Bnei Brak - son of "Reb Areleh" Roth.
    - Rafael Aaron Roth - Shomrei Emunim Rebbe in Bnei Brak - son of Rabbi Avrohom Chaim
    - Gedalya Moshe Roth - Shomrei Emunim Rebbe in Ashdod - son of Rabbi Avrohom Chaim
    - Shlomo Roth - Shomrei Emunim Rebbe in Jerusalem and Beth Shemesh - son of Rabbi Avrohom Chaim
    - Yaakov Yitzchok Roth - in Beitar Illit - son of Rabbi Avrohom Chaim
  - Avrohom Yitzchok Kohn (1914–1996) - author of Divrei Emunah - previous Toldos Aharon Rebbe of Jerusalem - son-in-law of "R' Areleh" Roth.
    - Shmuel Yaakov Kohn - present Toldos Avrohom Yitzchok Rebbe in Jerusalem - eldest son of the previous Toldos Aharon Rebbe.
    - Dovid Kohn - present Toldos Aharon Rebbe in Jerusalem - son of the previous Toldos Aharon Rebbe.
    - Yosef Yoel Kohn - present Mevakshei Emunah Rebbe - son of the previous Toldos Aharon Rebbe
    - Yisroel Chaim Kohn - present Nachlas Aharon Rebbe - son of the previous Toldos Aharon Rebbe
    - Moshe Kohn - Rosh Yeshiva of toldos Ahron

== Dress and customs ==
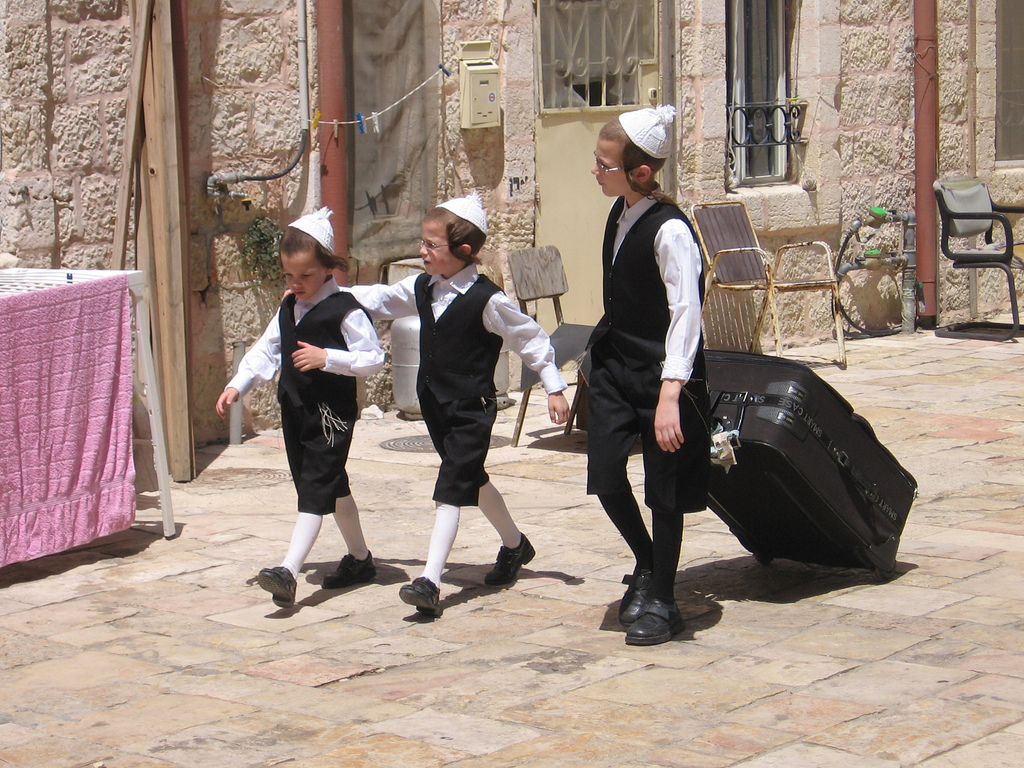
Toldos Aharon boys dressed for Shabbat, Mea Shearim, 2007

In Jerusalem, married men wear white and grey "zebra" coats during the week and golden bekishes/Caftan (coats) on Shabbos. Boys aged 13 (bar mitzvah) wear the golden coat and a shtreimel as married men do; married men can be differentiated by their white socks, while the unmarried boys wear black socks. In other Hasidic groups, only married men wear a shtreimel. All boys and men wear a traditional Jerusalemite white yarmulke. Unmarried boys wear a regular black coat with attached belt on weekdays, unlike the married men, who wear the "zebra" style coat.

Married women cover their hair without wearing wigs, as well as the rest of their entire bodies, as the standards of tzniut expected from them are the strictest among all Hasidic/Orthodox Jewish groups. As is customary in the traditional Jerusalemite community, unmarried girls have their hair in two braids, unlike most other Haredi communities, where the girls wear a simple ponytail.

The Shomrei Emunim are characterized by fervent and visibly emotional prayer, and by a rigid lifestyle controlled largely by "takanot" - decrees written by the Rebbe, akin to fatwas in Islam. One such decree, for example, forbade wearing wool, as Jewish law forbids wearing anything that contains both wool and linen, and Rabbi Aharon worried that it would be safest not to wear wool at all, as a precaution. A strong emphasis is placed on the importance of full-time Torah study, and daily immersion in ritual baths. In Jerusalem they have the "Third Temple Institute" whose mission is to prepare the Jewish People and the world for the Third Temple which will take the place of the first two destroyed Jewish Temple. The Anti-Zionist Toldos Aharon hasidic movement has also established a specialized study program for Jewish priests (kohanim) to prepare for Temple service.

== Hasidic books of the Shomer Emunim, Toldos Aharon, and Toldos Avrohom Yitzchok groups ==
In addition to those books which are revered by all Hasidic Jews, the Toldos Aharon Hasidim particularly revere the books, Shomer Emunim, Shulchan HaTahor, and Taharas HaKodesh, by Aharon Roth, and Divrei Emunoh by Avrohom Yitzchok Kohn. The version of the prayer book used by Toldos Aharon Hasidim is called Brochoh u'Tehilloh. The Toldos Avrohom Yitzchok have published a weekday prayer book called, Tehillas Avrohom Yitzchok, but also use the Brochoh u'Tehilloh version as well.

Avrohom Yitzchok Kohn was said to have instructed his followers to learn the works of Aharon HaLevi of Staroshelye, which include "Sha'arei HaYichud VeHaEmunoh", "Sha'arei Avoda", and "Avodas HaLevi". The Staroselyer Rebbe was a follower of the first Rebbe of Chabad, Shneur Zalman of Liadi. After the passing of Shneur Zalman, Aharon HaLevi started his own Hasidic following, an offshoot of Chabad, in Staroselye.

== See also ==
- Meir Brandsdorfer
