= Yaakov Blau =

Yaakov Yeshayah Blau (Hebrew: יעקב ישעיה בלאו; 1929–2013) was a rabbi and a dayan on the Badatz of the Edah HaChareidis in Jerusalem. He was known as an expert in the halakhot of Choshen Mishpat and served as halakhic decisor for over 50 years.

He was born in Jerusalem on 16 September 1929 and grew up in the home of Rabbi Yosef Tzvi Dushinsky, the first Dushinsky rebbe, who raised him after his father died when he was a young child.

In his youth, he studied at the Etz Chaim Yeshiva.

He authored various sefarim on the halakhot of loans and interest, as well as on the halakhot of mikveh.

As per the request of Rabbi Yitzchok Yaakov Weiss, he was selected to serve as dayan on the Badatz of the Edah HaChareidis.

He died on January 14, 2013 (age 84). He had three sons, Talmidei Chachamim.
