= Atchalta De'Geulah =

In the Talmud (b. Megillah 17b), Atchalta De'Geulah (Aramaic: אתחלתא דגאולה; Hebrew: התחלת הגאולה, Hatchalat ha-Geulah; lit., "the beginning of the redemption") is the period of time before the coming of the Jewish Messiah takes place. It is the core idea of the Religious Zionist movement.

== Origins in the classical texts ==
In the Jewish classical texts, from the Gemara and on, one may find many characterizations of the various stages of the redemption. Among the most notable of them are:

- Difficulties and sufferings - as is stated: "Let him [The Messiah] come, but let me not see him" - b. Talmud, Tractate Sanhedrin, 98b
- Growth of the Plants in the Land of Israel - In the Gemara, it is stated: "There is no more revealed end than this" - b. Talmud, Tractate Sanhedrin, 98a
- Jewish reign in the Land of Israel - As the words of the Amora Samuel utters: "There is no difference between this world and the days of the Messiah, except [that in the latter there will be no] bondage of foreign powers" - b. Talmud, Tractate Berakoth, 34b; words that later were ruled to be an Halakhaic law by Maimonides in his work Mishneh Torah
- Wars that the People of Israel participate in - "In the sixth year will be thunderings, in the seventh wars, at the end of the seventh, the son of David will come? War is also the Atchalta De'Geulah" - b. Talmud, Tractate Megillah, 17b

== Religious Zionist attitude ==
One of the fathers of the Religious Zionist Movement, a movement whose belief is that redeeming the Land of Israel and the establishment of the state of Israel will bring about the Jewish Messiah, was Rabbi Abraham Isaac HaCohen Kook ("HaRaAYaH"). In numerous references, he called his time Atchalta De'Geulah. In his epistle from 1918 (תרע"ח; Hebrew calendar), he writes:

"Atchalta De'Geulah [the beginning of the redemption] is undoubtedly coming about before us. Even though this coming about [process] has not begun this very day, only following the revealed end [times] (b. Talmud, Tractate Sanhedrin, 98a), banishing [us from the Land of Israel], and [then] only from the times that the people of Israel started [again] to shoot forth their branches and yield their fruits to the people of Israel [in their Land], for they are at hand to come [to be redeemed] (Book of Ezekiel, 36:8), and only then has this Atchalta (the beginning) begun."

— Iggeret HaRaAYaH, part III, p. 155

His son, Zvi Yehuda Kook, one of the main spiritual leaders of the Israeli settlement movement, following Rabbi Judah Loew ben Bezalel (the "Maharal of Prague"), in his work "Lenetivot Israel", reinforces his Atchalta De'Geulah argument for having an agricultural prosperity, which he views with favour, as is stated in the Gemara:

"R. Abba also said: There can be no more revealed end than this, as is stated (Book of Ezekiel, 36:8): But ye, O mountains of Israel, ye shall shoot forth your branches, and yield your fruit to my people of Israel, for they are at hand to come."

— b. Talmud, Tractate Sanhedrin, 98a

The principal learning textbook of the Religious Zionist movement is the book of Rabbi Menachem Mendel Kasher, HaTekufah HaGedolah ("The Great Era"), in which he explains the meaning of our times, according to the Religious Zionist view. Some additional textbooks that convey this world view are: Rabbi Yitzhak Dadon book, Atchalta Hee ("Atchalta it is"), and Rabbi Ya'akov Moshe Bergman's book, Can the state of Israel be the Atchalta De'Geulah?

== Haredi Judaism attitude ==
Haredi Judaism, in contrast to Religious Zionism, opines that the coming of the Jewish Messiah will bring about the redemption of the Land of Israel and its people (whenever this may occur, and in many different aspects). Regardless, some of the Haredi community, either outside or within the State of Israel, work with the Jewish rule of Israel and its state, and see the advantages of it. In their view, these are two separate issues: the State of Israel, and the coming of the Messiah.

Haredi Jews also distinguish between the concepts of:

1. Atchalta De'Geulah - the beginning of the redemption [process];
2. Ikveta De'Meshicha - the footsteps, (delay) of The Messiah (i. e., a period of time of crisis and suffering, leading up to the coming of the Jewish Messiah).

The Lubavitcher Rebbe of Chabad, Rabbi Menachem Mendel Schneerson, who was a strong supporter of Israel, opposed the concept of defining the State of Israel as an Atchalta De'Geulah: He claimed that many are killed in Israel due to some who attribute the term Atchalta De'Geulah to the State of Israel, and that, in so doing, such attribution is delaying the "revealed end [times]".

Israel Eldad wrote in an article in one of the major Israeli daily newspapers, Yedioth Ahronoth, about visiting the Lubavitcher Rebbe:

"When I tried to bring up the conventional formula of Religious Zionism, that Israel is the Atchalta De'Geulah ... his tone of voice took a sudden turn, he banged on the table with his fist, and retorted: 'Rabbi Kook was wrong ...' It was a separate issue in his mind."

== See also ==
- Orthodox Judaism
- Religious Zionism
- Haredi Judaism
- Types of Zionism
- Gathering of Israel
- Religion in Israel
- Yom HaAliyah
