= Toldos Avrohom Yitzchok =

Toldos Avrohom Yitzchok Hasidic Dynasty
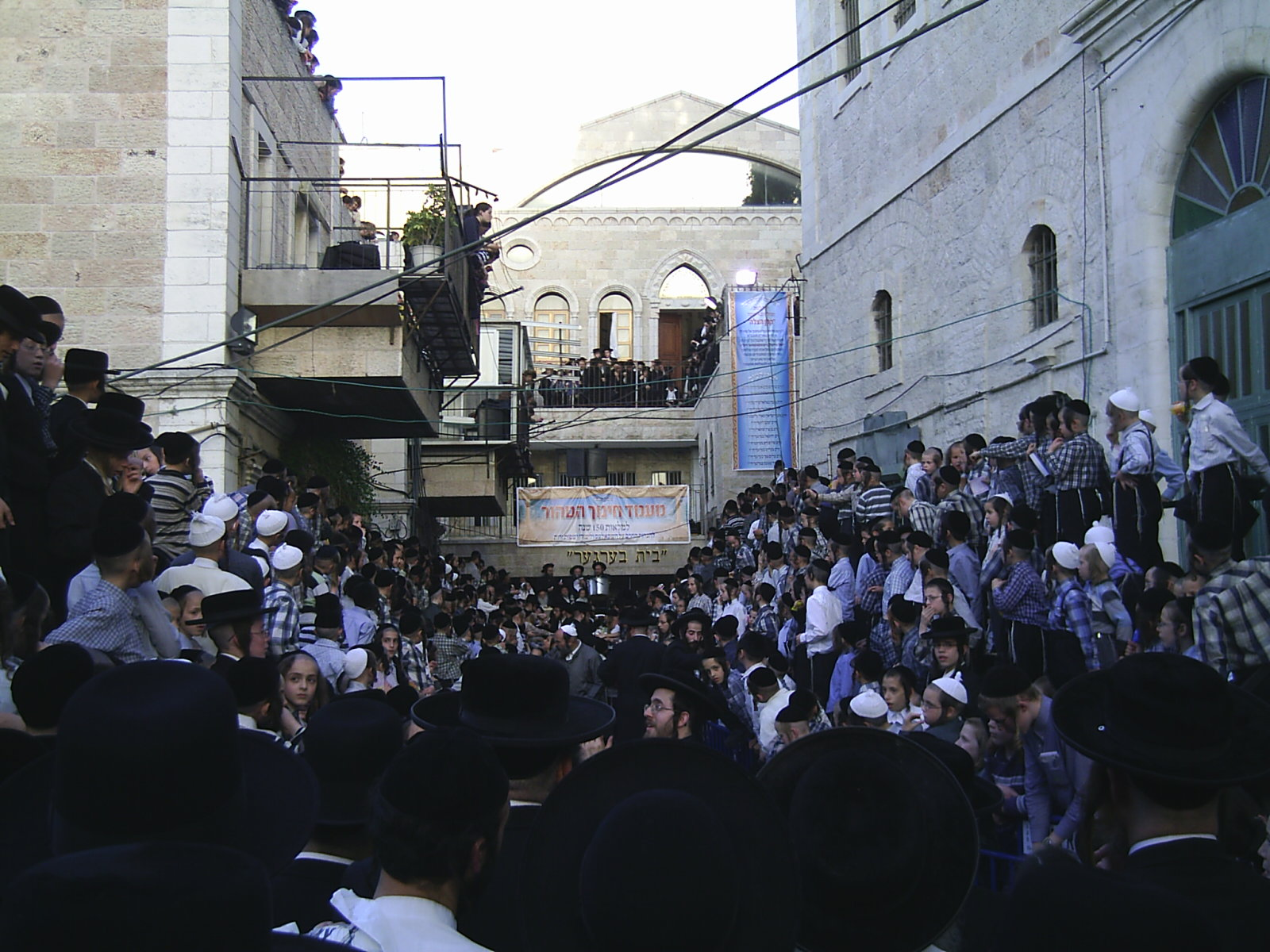
- A gathering of Hasidim in Jerusalem

Founder
- Rabbi Aharon Roth

Regions with significant populations
- United States, Israel

Religions
- Hasidic Judaism

Toldos Avrohom Yitzchok is a Hasidic group located in Jerusalem's Mea Shearim neighborhood. It is an offshoot of the Hasidic group Toldos Aharon, which is in turn an offshoot of Shomer Emunim. It is led by its Rebbe, Rabbi Shmuel Yaakov Kohn.

Toldos Avrohom Yitzchok is one of the groups that make up the Edah HaChareidis. Until his death in May 2009, Rabbi Meir Brandsdorfer served as both the halachic decisor of Toldos Avrohom Yitzchok and member of the Badatz of the Edah HaChareidis.

== History ==
Rabbi Aharon Roth was known to be very anti-Zionist, and his Hasidim today continue that tradition, particularly the Toldos Aharon and Toldos Avrohom Yitchok groups. They owe their strong opinions on Zionism to the literal reading of the Talmud's proclamation that Jews should not take over the Holy Land prior to the coming of the Messiah. (For more information about this subject, see Three Oaths; compare also Satmar's opposition to Zionism. While Rabbi Aharon's opposition to Zionism predated the publication of the Satmar Rav's book Vayoel Moshe, the Satmar Rav's reasoning and Rabbi Aharon's reasoning for opposing Zionism are similar, if not identical.)

When Rabbi Aharon died, his son and his son-in-law both became rebbes in their own right. The dynastic chain being:

- Rebbe Aharon "Reb Areleh" Roth (d. 1946) - author of Shomrei Emunim, Shulchan HaTahor, and Taharas HaKodesh - founding Rebbe of Shomrei Emunim dynasty in the town of Satmar, Hungary, and Jerusalem.
  - Rebbe Avrohom Chaim Roth - (d. 2012) Shomrei Emumim Rebbe in Jerusalem and Bnei Brak - son of "Reb Areleh" Roth.
  - Rebbe Avrohom Yitzchok Kohn (d. 1996) - author of Divrei Emunah - previous Toldos Aharon Rebbe of Jerusalem - son-in-law of "R' Areleh" Roth.
    - Rebbe Shmuel Yaakov Kohn - Toldos Avrohom Yitzchok Rebbe in Jerusalem - eldest son of the previous Toldos Aharon Rebbe.
    - Rebbe Dovid Kohn - present Toldos Aharon Rebbe in Jerusalem - son of the previous Toldos Aharon Rebbe.

Rabbi Avrohom Yitzchok Kohn, the previous Toldos Aharon Rebbe, died during Hanukkah of 1996. Rabbi Kohn had many sons, two of whom are rebbes today. After Rabbi Kohn died, these two sons came to an agreement whereby the younger son Rabbi Duvid Kohn from Monsey, New York, inherited the title "Toldos Aharon Rebbe". The eldest son, Rabbi Shmuel Yaakov Kohn, a disciple of the Viznitzer Rebbe, became a rebbe as well, of a group that was entitled Toldos Avrohom Yitzchok named after his father, the previous rebbe of the group. The main beis medrash of Toldos Avrohom Yitzchok is also in Mea Shearim, one block away from the Toldos Aharon building. Both live in Jerusalem. Another son is a rosh yeshiva in Kiryas Joel, New York.

== Dress and customs ==
In Jerusalem, married men wear white and grey "Zebra" coats during the week and golden bekishes (coats) on Shabbos. Toldos Aharon and Toldos Avrohom Yitzchok are among the few groups where boys aged 13 and older (bar mitzvah) wear the golden coat and a shtreimel, as married men do, although the single boys wear black socks and the married men wear white socks. In most other Hasidic groups, only married men wear a shtreimel. All boys and men wear a traditional Jerusalemite white yarmulke. Unmarried boys wear a regular black coat with attached belt on weekdays, unlike the married men, who wear the "Zebra" style coat.

Married women cover their hair with scarves, without wearing wigs, and the standards of tznius expected from them are the strictest among all Hasidic/Orthodox Jewish groups. As is customary in the traditional Jerusalemite community, unmarried girls have their hair in two braided pigtails, unlike most other Haredi communities, where the girls wear their hair in a simple ponytail.

The Shomrei Emunim are characterized by fervent and visibly emotional prayer, and by a rigid lifestyle controlled largely by "takanos" - decrees written by the Rebbe. One such decree, for example, forbade wearing wool. (Jewish law forbids wearing anything that contains both wool and linen. Rabbi Aharon worried that it would be safest not to wear wool at all, in order to avoid the possibility of violating the law altogether.) A strong emphasis is placed on the importance of full-time Torah study, and daily immersion in ritual baths.

== Hasidic books of the Shomer Emunim, Toldos Aharon, and Toldos Avrohom Yitzchok groups ==
In addition to those books which are revered by all Hasidic Jews, the Toldos Aharon Hasidim particularly revere the books, Shomer Emunim, Shulchan HaTahor, and Taharas HaKodesh, by Rebbe Aharon Roth, and Divrei Emunoh by Rebbe Avrohom Yitzchok Kahn. The version of the prayer book used by Toldos Aharon Hasidim is called Brochoh u'Tehilloh. The version of the prayer book used by Toldos Avrohom Yitzchok Hasidim is called, Tehillas Avrohom Yitzchok. The previous Rebbe of Toldos Aharon, R' Avrohom Yitzchok, was said to have instructed his followers to learn the works of Rabbi Aharon HaLevi of Staroshelye (pronounced Strashelye), which include "Sha'arei HaYichud VeHaEmunoh," "Sha'arei Avoda," and "Avodas HaLevi." The Staroselyer Rebbe was a follower of the first Rebbe of Chabad, Rabbi Shneur Zalman of Liadi. After the passing of R' Shneur Zalman, R' Aharon HaLevi started his own Chassidic following, an offshoot of Chabad, in Staroselye.

== See also ==
- Rabbi Meir Brandsdorfer
