= Edah HaChareidis =

Large ultra-Orthodox Jewish communal organization based in Jerusalem

- Charedi Community of Jerusalem
- העדה החרדית
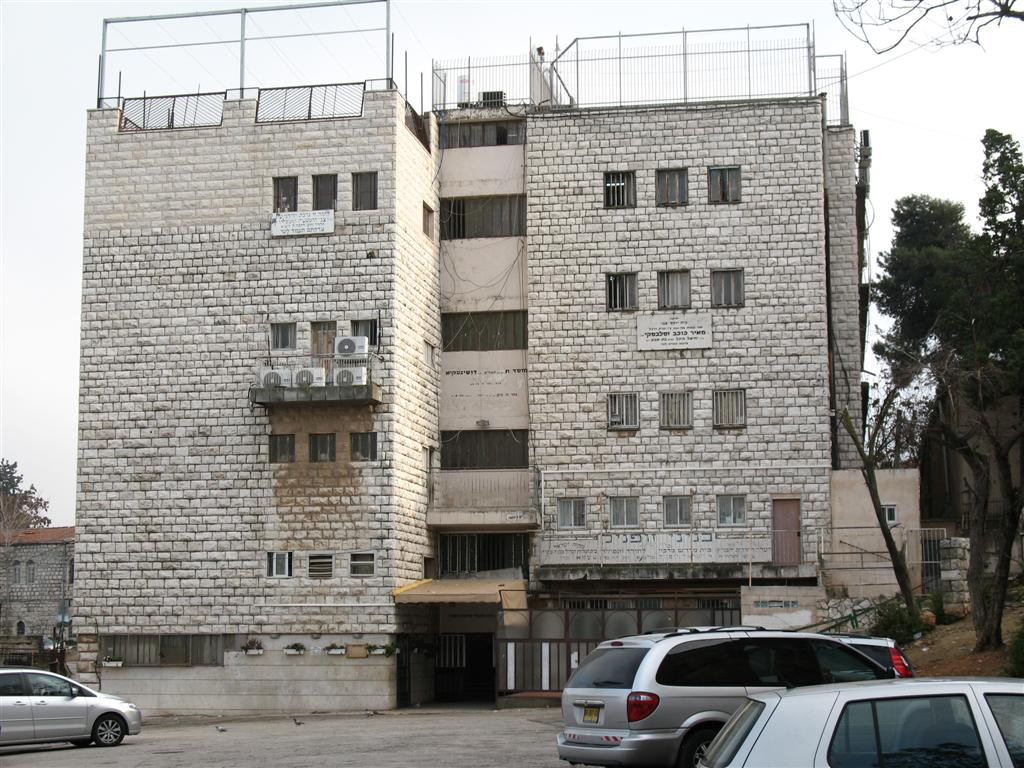
- Headquarters In Jerusalem
- Formation: 1918; 108 years ago
- Founder: Rabbi Yosef Chaim Sonnenfeld, Rabbi Yitzchok Yerucham Diskin
- Founded at: Jerusalem
- Headquarters: Jerusalem
- Members: 40,000
- Official language: Yiddish, Hebrew
- Chief Rabbi: vacant
- Head of Court: Rabbi Moshe Sternbuch
- Publication: HaEdah, Madrich HaKashruth
- Secessions: Agudat Yisrael, Neturei Karta, Karlin, Khal Adas Yerushalayim
- Affiliations: Haredi Judaism
- Formerly called: Ashkenazi City Council

The Charedi Community of Jerusalem (Hebrew: העדה החרדית, haEdah haCharedit, Ashkenazi pronunciation: ho-Aideh HaCharaidis or ho-Eido ha-Chareidis; "Community of God-Fearers") is a large Haredi Jewish communal organization based in Jerusalem. It has several thousand affiliated households and is chaired by the Grand Patriarch (Ga'avad), who also holds the title of chief rabbi (Mara D'Ara D'Yisroel מרא דארעא דישראל). The Community is led by a Beis Din, and provides facilities such as Kashrut supervision, Mikva'oth, Eruvin, and welfare services.

The Community was founded in 1918 by devout Ashkenazi residents of Jerusalem, especially of the Old Yishuv, who refused to be affiliated in any way with the new Zionist institutions. Inspired by militant anti-Zionist ideology, it refuses to receive any state funding from the Israeli authorities, relying on donations from fellow anti-Zionist Haredi Jews abroad and its own income, and it forbids voting in Israeli elections. Its members often engage in demonstrations against Sabbath desecration, autopsies, or archaeological excavations of human remains, which they regard as sins, and are noted for their poverty and extreme religious strictness.

== History ==
The Edah HaChareidis was originally founded by Rabbi Yosef Chaim Sonnenfeld and Rabbi Yitzchok Yerucham Diskin (son of Rabbi Yehoshua Leib Diskin) in 1918, as the Ashkenazic City Council (Va'ad Ha'Ir Ha'Ashkenazi ועד העיר האשכנזי), to separate from the Zionist-controlled General City Council. Rabbi Sonnenfeld had previously been the de facto chief rabbi of Jerusalem since 1909, after the death of Rabbi Shmuel Salant, but only accepted the official title in 1920, in order to counter the establishment of the Chief Rabbinate by the Zionist movement under British auspices. The Council originally had two rabbinical courts, one for the perushim and one for the chassidim, over which Rabbi Sonnenfeld was named as the first Av Beis Din, a position he held until his death in 1932. In 1936 the two courts joined and the organization received its current name.

While the Edah was originally affiliated with the World Agudath Israel, after the Agudah grudgingly began to cooperate with the Jewish Agency and other Zionist bodies, Amram Blau and Aharon Katzenellenbogen of Jerusalem broke away in 1938 to form Neturei Karta, refusing to have any dealings with the Zionists. During the 1940s the Neturei Karta became increasingly critical of the Agudah's position and in 1945 they succeeded in expelling Agudah members from the Edah, who eventually formed the Agudat Yisrael political party.

Rabbi Sonnenfeld was succeeded by Rabbi Yosef Tzvi Dushinsky, who was succeeded by Rabbi Zelig Reuven Bengis, who was succeeded by the Satmar Rebbe, Grand Rabbi Joel Teitelbaum. Teitelbaum had already emigrated to the United States, but was still given the position as chief rabbi of the Edah. Teitelbaum's nephew, the late Grand Rabbi Moshe Teitelbaum of Satmar, was given the title of President upon Rabbi Joel Teitelbaum's death. The lay leader of the body for many years was Gershon Stemmer, until his death in early 2007.

== Anti-Zionist ideology ==
The first chief rabbi of the Edah, Rabbi Yosef Chaim Sonnenfeld, often referred to the Zionists as "evil men and ruffians" and claimed that "Hell had entered the Land of Israel with Herzl." The spokesman for the Edah at the time, Dr. Jacob Israël de Haan, endeavored to form an alliance with the Arab nationalist leadership and hoped to reach an agreement that would allow unrestricted Jewish settlement in Arab lands in return for the relinquishment of Jewish political aspirations. In June 1924, de Haan was assassinated by the Haganah after having conveyed his proposals to King Hussein and his sons, Faisal and Abdullah.

The anti-Zionist ideological stance of the Edah HaChareidis is explicated in the book Vayoel Moshe, written by its former President and Chief Rabbi, Joel Teitelbaum, which is regarded as the standard, and by which all issues relating to the modern State of Israel are generally determined. For example, the community forbids voting in the elections for the Knesset, and forbids accepting any funding from the Israeli government (such as subsidies for schools and unemployment benefits), and also does not accept Israeli citizenship through the Law of Return. According to Ynetnews, "It [the Edah] has declared an ideological war against the 'heretic Zionist government'."

In 2002, the rabbinical leadership of the Edah wrote a complementary introduction to Vayoel Moshe. The introduction mentioned: "and it is necessary to learn about this subject [of Zionism]... the holy book Vayoel Moshe will open [its readers'] eyes to see [the reasons behind] all troubles and horrors of our time, and will prevent readers from being drawn after the Zionist heresy, may the Merciful One save us."

The Rabbinical Court of the Edah HaChareidis has endorsed the anti-zionist organization Torah Jews

The Edah HaChareidis mourns the establishment of Israel on the fifth of Iyar each year, claiming that the establishment of a Jewish state before the coming of the Messiah is a sin and heresy. Some even fast on this day and recite prayers for fast days.

In 2006, during a campaign against the participation of Haredim in the Israeli parliamentary elections, the Edah accused the Zionists of having played a role in the Holocaust.

In March 2008, an article in the Edah's newspaper HaEdah blasted the "first Hasidic police officer" and the newspapers who had praised him, and called for him to be thrown out of the Haredi world. It referred to him as presenting his children to Molech. Addressing him personally, it said: "and even if you are great in your own eyes, you are worth nothing and an embarrassment to us"; and: "We will continue our continuous war, the days of which are the same as the days of the existence of the Zionist entity, against them and against everything you represent."

Earlier in 2008, Rabbi Binyomin Rabinowitz, a Member of the Court, was quoted as saying: "If religious Jews would not co-operate with the Zionists, [the state] would have long been annulled, and the Messiah would have come, and entire delay of the redemption is [attributable to] this matter."

On 7 November 2006, the Edah said it was considering placing the Pulsa denura curse on the organizers of the Pride parade scheduled to march in Jerusalem on 10 November 2006. Army Radio interviewed Rabbi Shmuel Papenheim, who announced, "The Rabbinical Court has held a special session and discussed placing a 'pulsa denura' on those who have had a hand in organizing the march." Papenheim, editor of HaEdah, added that the rabbis were also considering placing the curse "against the policemen who beat Haredi Jews".

== Influence ==
Followers of the movements that constitute the Edah HaChareidis are estimated at approximately fifteen thousand households, and live mainly in the northern areas of Jerusalem (from Har Nof to Sanhedria, and in Mea Shearim) and in Beit Shemesh, as well as in Bnei Brak, Tiberius, Safed, and Meron, with additional members in Kiryat Sefer, Beitar Illit, and Har Yonah.

The Edah HaChareidis includes the following groups: Satmar, Dushinsky, Toldos Aharon, Toldos Avrohom Yitzchok, Spinka, Sanz-Tshokave, groups belonging to the Perushim (such as a more "moderate" wing of Neturei Karta), a faction of the Breslover Hasidim, led by Rabbi Yaakov Meir Shechter, other factions of Breslov, Mishkenois HaRoyim, Khal Chasidei Yerushalayim, and several other smaller communities.

The Edah HaChareidis publicizes a weekly magazine called HaEdah ("The Edah"), written in Hebrew. This magazine is used to publicize the views of the leadership of the Edah HaChareidis on various issues, as well as articles on Jewish thought, including the weekly Torah portion and biographies of deceased leaders of the Yerushalmi community.

The state-sponsored Israeli Chief Rabbinate recognizes divorces performed by the Edah's rabbinical court, as well as marriages registered with the Edah's Marriage Registry Chamber, per a settlement hearkening back to British rule. Yet, like all those performed by non-governmental bodies in Israel, converts to Judaism who convert through the Edah's courts are neither recognized nor eligible for citizenship under the Law of Return.

In a 2004 letter addressed to Ritual Circumcisers, the Israeli chief rabbinate noted that its guidance is similar to that of the Edah HaChareidis.

In response to day-long Haredi protests in Jerusalem in 2009, Israel's then-President Shimon Peres described the Edah as "a radical minority".

== Services ==
The kashruth certification stamp of the Badatz

The Edah HaChareidis is known for its high standards in rabbinical supervision of kosher food, and is considered to be the most prominent and reliable hechsher in Israel. It is often simply known as the hechsher of the "Badatz", which stands for Beis Din Tzedek (literally, "Court [of] Righteous Law"), the standard term for a rabbinical court. Products certified by the Edah are marked with the logo of the Edah.

The Kashruth Council of the Edah HaChareidis (וועד הכשרות שע"י בד"ץ העדה החרדית) is the primary supervisory body. The council certifies all food products, besides meat and poultry, which are certified by the Council for Ritual Slaughter of the Edah HaChareidis (וועד השחיטה שע"י בד"ץ העדה החרדית). The Kashruth Council of the Edah HaChareidis publishes a kashruth guide annually under the title Madrich HaKashruth.

The Edah maintains various smaller councils, mostly to supervise and certify various products and services, as follows:

- The Shemita Council of the Edah HaChareidis (וועד השמיטה שע"י העדה החרדית), which supervises produce and fields during the Shemita year;
- The Eruv Council of the Edah HaChareidis (וועד העירובין שע"י העדה החרדית), which supervises and maintains the Eruvin in parts of Jerusalem, Safed, Meron and Beit Shemesh;
- The Chamber of Sta"m of the Edah HaChareidis (לשכת סת"ם שע"י העדה החרדית), which supervises Soferim and other producers of Sta"m;
- The Council for Halachic Supervision of Investments and Finances of the Edah HaChareidis (וועד הפיקוח ההלכתי להשקעות ופיננסים שע"י העדה החרדית), which ensures that financial products and services comply with the laws of Ribbis;
- The Council for Halachic Supervision of the Edah HaChareidis (וועד הפיקוח ההלכתי שע"י העדה החרדית), which certifies assorted items such as Tzitzis and the Four Species, among others;
- The Council to Guard Mea Shearim (וועד משמרת מאה שערים), charged with preserving the character of the neighborhood;
- The Marriage Registry Chamber of the Edah HaChareidis (לשכת רישום נישואין שע"י העדה החרדית).

The Edah also employs many Posekim, and maintains Bais Hora'ahs בית הוראה, which are offices for Halachic decisions, throughout Jerusalem and Beit Shemesh.

== Rabbinical court ==
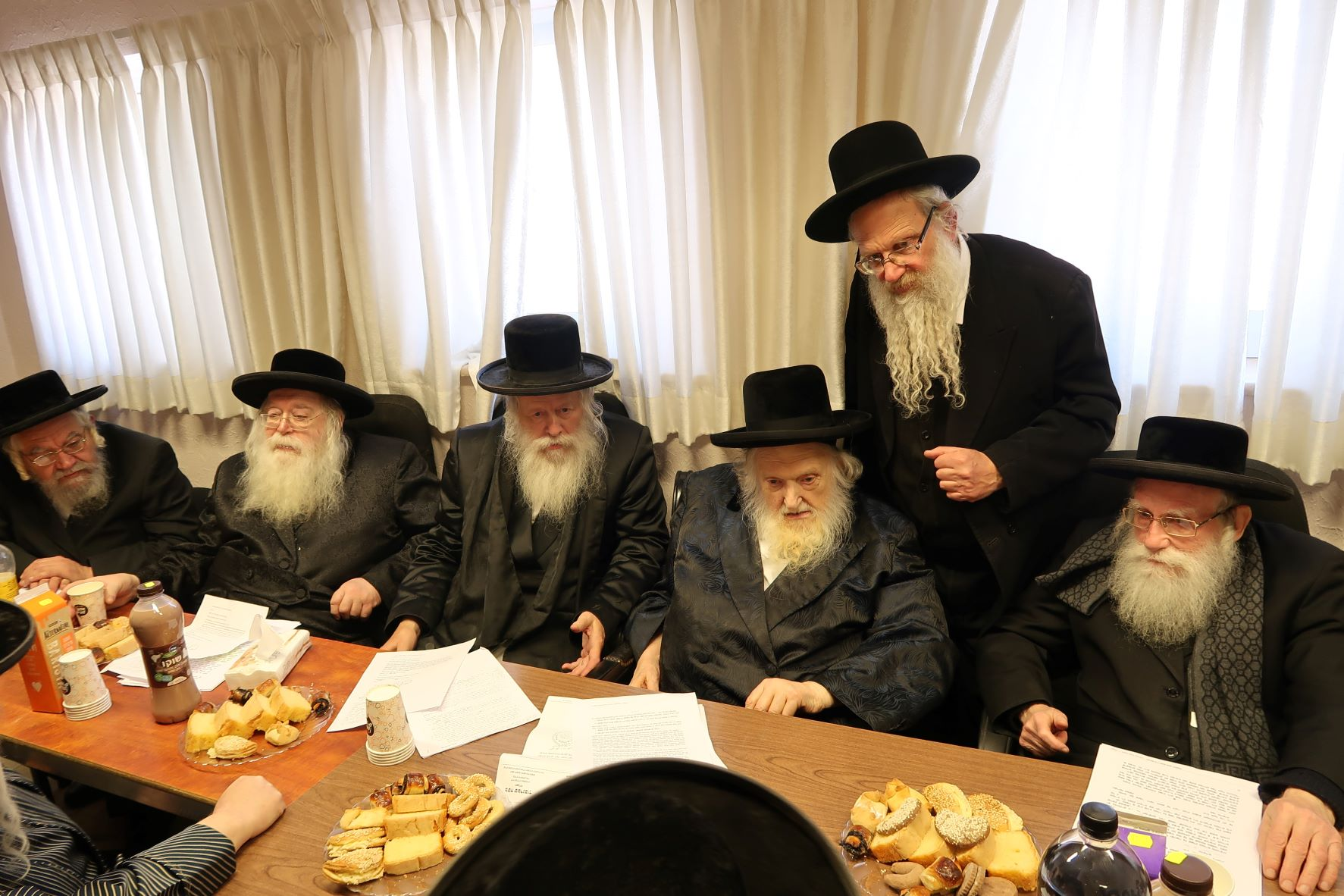
Members of the Court at a meeting

Letterhead of the Rabbinical Court

The Rabbinical Court of the Edah HaChareidis (בית דין צדק לכל מקהלות האשכנזים שע"י העדה החרדית) is the highest authority in the Edah. The court hears both monetary and family cases, as well as community-wide halachic questions. Historically, the court is headed by both a Chief Rabbi, called the "Ga'avad" גאב"ד (an acronym for Gaon Av Beis Din, meaning Grand Patriarch of the Rabbinical Court), and by the "Ra'avad" ראב"ד (an acronym for Rosh Beis Din, meaning Head of the Rabbinical Court). The "Ra'avad" is the first person in the line of succession of the "Ga'avad", and would usually ascend to the role of "Ga'avad" upon his death or resignation, subject to confirmation by vote.

=== Titles and honorifics ===
Decrees and announcements promulgated by the court are usually published under one of the following headers:

- (when signed by the Ga'avad) "By the authority of our teachers, the geniuses, the righteous, (or the princes of Torah) (his honorable holiness) our master the Ga'avad and the righteous court, may they live long and good days Amen".
- (when signed by the Ra'avad and not by the Ga'avad) "By the authority of our teachers, the geniuses, the righteous, (or the princes of Torah) (his honorable holiness) our masters the Ra'avad and the righteous court, may they live long and good days Amen".
- (when signed by neither the Ra'avad nor the Ga'avad) "By the authority of our teachers, the geniuses, the righteous, the members of the righteous court (of this here holy city), may they live long and good days Amen".

The following lists the proper (written) titles of the various members of the Edah's rabbinical court:

- (Ga'avad) His Honorable Holiness, our Master the Ga'avad, may he live long and good days Amen, Master of the Land of Israel (or the Holy Land);
- (Ra'avad) His Honorable Holiness, the Ra'avad, may he live long and good days Amen;
- (Members) The great genius, Rabbi So-and-So, may he live long and good days Amen, Member of the Righteous Court.

The following lists the members of the Edah's rabbinical court:

=== Chief Rabbis ===
The Ga'avad holds three titles: Grand Patriarch of the Court of Jerusalem, Chief Rabbi of Jerusalem, and Master of the Land of Israel.

1. 1920–1932: Rabbi Yosef Chaim Sonnenfeld (1849–1932)
2. 1932–1948: Grand Rabbi Yosef Tzvi Dushinsky, First Dushinsky Rebbe (1867–1948)
3. 1947–1953: Rabbi Zelig Reuven Bengis (1864–1953)
4. 1953–1979: Grand Rabbi Joel Teitelbaum of Satmar (1887–1979)
5. 1979–1989: Rabbi Yitzchok Yaakov Weiss (1901–1989; author of Minchas Yitzchak, formerly of Manchester Beth Din, England)
6. 1989–1996: Rabbi Moshe Aryeh Freund (1904–1996; author of Ateres Yehoshua (Chassidei Satmar)
7. 1996–2002: Grand Rabbi Yisroel Moshe Dushinsky, Second Dushinsky Rebbe (1921–2003; son of Rabbi Yosef Tzvi Dushinsky, listed above)
8. 2002–2022: Rabbi Yitzchok Tuvia Weiss (1926–2022; formerly dayan of the Machsike Hadass community, Antwerp, Belgium)

=== Heads of Court ===
1. 1920–1921: Rabbi Moshe Nochum Wallenstein (1840–1922)
2. 1924–1929: Rabbi Mordechai Leib Rubin (1871–1929)
3. 1929–1938: Rabbi Pinchas Epstein (d.1969)
4. 1938–1948: Rabbi Zelig Reuven Bengis (1864–1953)
5. 1948–1968: Rabbi Pinchas Epstein (d.1969)
6. 1968–1972: Rabbi Dovid Jungreis (1898–1972)
7. 1972–1979: Rabbi Yitzchok Yaakov Weiss (1901–1989)
8. 1979–1989: Rabbi Moshe Aryeh Freund (1904–1996)
9. 1989–1996: Grand Rabbi Yisroel Moshe Dushinsky (1921–2003)
10. 1996–2003: Rabbi Yisroel Yaakov Fisher (1928–2003)
11. 2003–present: Rabbi Moshe Sternbuch (b.1926)

=== Past members ===
- Rabbi Naphtali Tzvi Shmerler (1888–1948)
- Rabbi Yerucham Fishel Yehoshua Borenstein (1880–1949)
- Rabbi Yitzchok Frankel
- Rabbi Dov Tzvi Karlenstein (1856–1930)
- Rabbi Simcha Bunim Werner (1867–1936)
- Rabbi Gershon Yehuda Zilberman
- Rabbi Yisroel Yitzchok Reisman (1889–1969)
- Rabbi Eliyohu Zlotnik
- Rabbi Binyomin Rabinowitz
- Rabbi Avrohom Dovid Horowitz
- Rabbi Moshe Halberstam (1932–2006)
- Rabbi Meir Brandsdorfer (1934–2009) (Chasidei Toldos Avrohom Yitzchok)
- Rabbi Yaakov Blau (1929–2013)
- Rabbi Naftoli Hertzke Frankel (1939–2017)
- Rabbi Yaakov Mendel Yuravitch (1952-2026)

=== Present members ===
- 1989: Rabbi Moshe Sternbuch, Head of Rabbinical Court ראב"ד
- Rabbi Avrohom Yitzchok Ulman (Chasidei Dushinsky)
- 2006: Rabbi Yehoshua Rosenberger (Chasidei Satmar)
- 2009: Rabbi Chaim Uri Freund
- 2013: Rabbi Yehuda Fisher
- 2021: Rabbi Shlomo Yuda Hirsh
- 2021: Rabbi Yisrael Yitzchak Shlesinger
- 2021: Rabbi Shmuel Bransdorfer, son of Meir Brandsdorfer
- 2023: Rabbi Aharon Brandsdorfer

== Lay leadership ==
The lay leadership of the Edah is officially called the Ashkenazic City Council of the Edah HaChareidis (וועד העיר האשכנזי שע"י העדה החרדית).

=== Presidents ===
The President of the Edah Hachareidis is a purely ceremonial office and is usually granted to prominent rabbis to honor their contributions to the Edah. The following is a list of the presidents of the Edah:

1. 1918-1925: Rabbi Yitzchok Yerucham Diskin (1839-1925)
2. 1951–1979: Grand Rabbi Joel Teitelbaum of Satmar (1887–1979)
3. 1979–2006: Grand Rabbi Moshe Teitelbaum of Satmar (1914–2006)
4. 2006–2021: Rabbi Dovid Soloveitchik, rosh yeshiva of Brisk (1921–2021)

=== Administration ===
The lay leadership of the Edah originally consisted of three bodies, a Council of Seventy elected by the general membership, which in turn selected from within itself a Council of Twenty-Three, which in turn selected from within itself the members of the Acting Committee (וועד הפועל שע"י העדה החרדית). The Acting Committee ran the day-to-day affairs of the Edah, while graver or more important decisions were left to the Council of Twenty-Three, and very important decisions left to the full Council of Seventy.

Currently the Edah is controlled by a forty-one-member administrative board based on a system of communal representation. The board is called The Administration of the Edah HaChareidis (הנהלת העדה החרדית). The following is a list of the various communities represented, followed by the number of representatives:

- Dushinsky - (5)
- Toldos Aharon - (5)
- Toldos Avrohom Yitzchok - (5)
- Satmar(Zalman Leib) - (5)
- Breslov - (5)
- Satmar(Aaron) - (5)
- Perushim - (4)
- Mishkenois HaRoyim - (2)
- Khal Tiferes Yerushalayim - (2)
- Khal Chasidei Yerushalayim - (1)
- Khal Anshei Yerushalayim - (1)
- Anshei Yishuv Hayoshon - (1)

Additionally, each community has one representative on the Acting Committee.
