= Kiryat Shomrei Emunim =

Neighborhood in Jerusalem, Israel

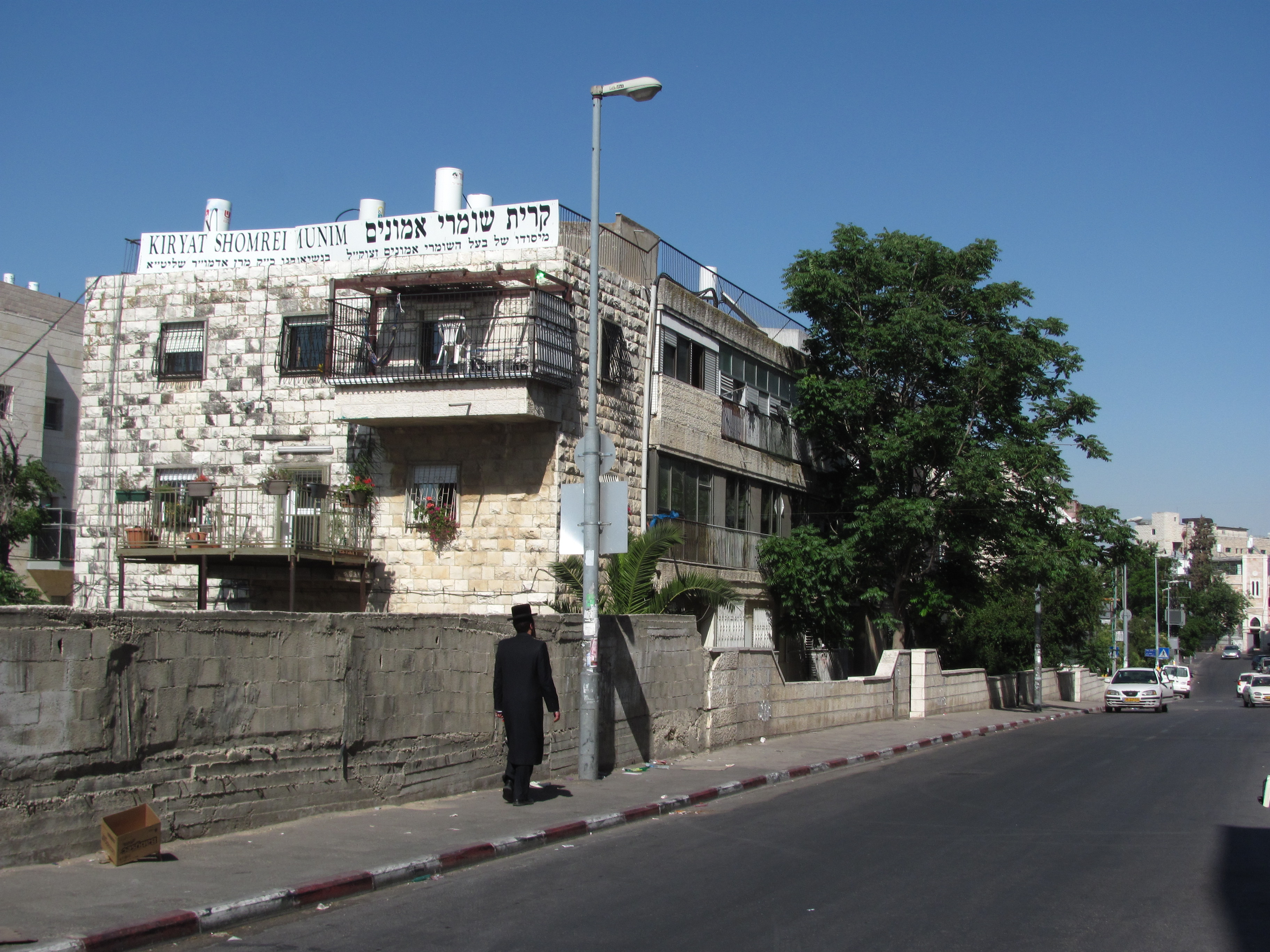
Buildings of Kiryat Shomrei Emunim lining Shomrei Emunim Street

Kiryat Shomrei Emunim (Hebrew: קרית שומרי אמונים, "City of the Guardians of the Faithful") is a Hasidic Jewish neighborhood in western Jerusalem. It was founded in the early 1960s by the Shomrei Emunim Rebbe, Rabbi Avrohom Chaim Roth.

== Name ==
The neighborhood is named after the eponymous book by Aharon Roth, founder of the Shomer Emunim Hasidic dynasty. This work contains essays on the subjects of "faith, reward and punishment, redemption, and a passionate yearning for God". The main street in the neighborhood is also called Shomrei Emunim Street.

== Location ==
Kiryat Shomrei Emunim is bordered by Mea Shearim to the south, Beit Yisrael to the west and north, and Shivtei Yisrael Street to the east.

== History ==
Kiryat Shomrei Emunim was established in the early 1960s by Rabbi Avrohom Chaim Roth, the Shomrei Emunim Rebbe, son and successor of the founder of the Shomer Emunim dynasty, Aharon Roth. The Rebbe selected a site between the long-established neighborhoods of Mea Shearim and Beit Yisrael. He procured a gift of IL50,000 from the Bank of Israel toward construction costs. In addition to residential buildings, the Rebbe opened a Talmud Torah and yeshiva.

Over time, the neighborhood grew to include 12 buildings, a synagogue, yeshiva gedola, yeshiva ketana, kollel, and mikveh. In 1975 a Bais Yaakov girls high school moved to Kiryat Shomrei Emunim.

In 1976 the Rebbe relocated to Bnei Brak, but returned to the neighborhood each year to celebrate the holidays of Rosh Hashana, Yom Kippur, Sukkot, and Shavuot with his Hasidim in Jerusalem.

== Attempted terror attack ==
On January 11, 2001, a resident spotted a large bag deposited in a garbage can on Shomrei Emunim Street. She called over her brother, a 36-year-old father of five who studies in a neighborhood yeshiva. He opened the bag and saw a bomb connected to a cell phone with wires. He detached the wires from the cell phone and then called police. While police were examining the bomb, which consisted of two mortar shells, the cell phone rang, but the connection had been severed. This was the second of four attempted bombings in the vicinity of Mea Shearim and Beit Yisrael over a two-month period.

== Expansion ==
In 2013 developers broke ground on an additional 150 apartment units in Kiryat Shomrei Emunim, a project that will double the population base. The project includes a 1,000-square-metre (11,000 sq ft) ornamental garden and a public playground. The new units are expected to attract high demand due to the neighborhood's proximity to neighboring Hasidic communities, the Jerusalem city center, and the Western Wall.
