= Avrohom Yitzchok Kohn =

Hasidic rebbe (1914–1996)

Rabbi Avrohom Yitzchok Kohn Ha'Kohen
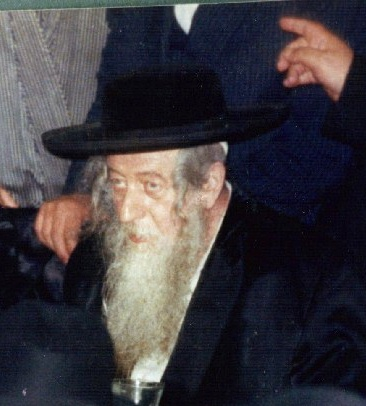

Personal life
- Born: 4 January 1914 Safed, Ottoman Empire
- Died: 8 December 1996 (aged 82)
- Parents: Aharon David Kohn (father); Sheindel Bracha (mother)
- Dynasty: Toldos Aharon

Religious life
- Religion: Judaism
- Yahrtzeit: 27 Kislev
- Dynasty: Toldos Aharon

Rabbi Avrohom Yitzchok Kohn (Hebrew: אברהם יצחק קאהן) (4 January 1914 – 8 December 1996) was a Hasidic rabbi and founder of the Toldos Aharon Hasidim. He was the son-in-law of Rabbi Aharon Roth, and the Toldos Avrohom Yitzchok is named after him.

== Biography ==
Kohn was born in Safed to Rabbi Aharon David and his wife Scheindel Bracha. His mother was the granddaughter of Rabbi Avraham Yitzhak Heller, son of Rabbi Shmuel Heller. As a child, his family moved to Transylvania, Romania. He studied with Rabbi Yisrael Friend of Hunyad, the son of Rabbi Avraham Yehoshua Freynd and with Rabbi Yehuda Segal Rosner. He was a disciple and follower of Rabbi Joel Teitelbaum, the Satmar Rebbe.

Following Roth's death in 1947, many Hasids turned to Kohn as his successor, who became the rabbi of Toldos Aharon. A minority of rebbes chose his brother-in-law, Rabbi Avrohom Chaim Roth, who founded the Shomer Emunim Hasidism. During his leadership, Hasidic institutions were established across Israel and the United States. He wrote the Divrei Emunah in 1967.

He died on 8 December 1996 during Hannukah after nearly 50 years of leadership of his branch of Hasidism. A majority of his followers supported his son, Rabbi David Kohn, as his successor. The rest became followers of David's elder brother, Rabbi Shmuel Yakov Kohn, who established a new court. He is buried at the Mount of Olives Jewish Cemetery.

Rabbi Meir Brandsdorfer was a notable student of his.

== Children ==
- Rabbi Shmuel Yakov Kohn, who established a new court
- Rabbi David Kohn, his father's successor
- Rabbi Moshe Kohn, Rosh Yeshiva of Toldot Aharon
- Rabbi Aharon Kohn, son-in-law of Rabbi Shmuel Chaim Reuven Wagshahl of Landshut; he died of COVID-19 in 2020
- Rabbi Yisrael Chaim Kohn, Rebbe of Nahalat Aharon in Beit Shemesh, son-in-law of Rabbi Avraham Tzvi Baek of Melbourne
- Rabbi Yosef Yoel Kohn, Mashpia and son-in-law of Rabbi Menachem Monderer
- Rebbetzin Dina, wife of Rabbi David Zvi Shlomo Naftali Biderman of Lelov in Borough Park
- Rebbetzin Raizel, wife of Rabbi Naftali Tzvi Rotenberg; founder of an aid organization for widows and orphans
- Rebbetzin Shifra Leah, wife of Rabbi Shlomo Zalman Katz in Williamsburg
