= Amram Blau =

Haredi rabbi who co-founded Neturei Karta (1894–1974)

- עמרם בלאו
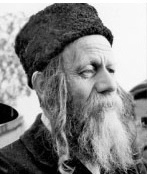
- Title: Rabbi

Personal life
- Born: 1894 Jerusalem
- Died: 1974 (aged 79–80)
- Spouse: Hinda Weber Blau; Ruth Ben-David Blau (1965)

Religious life
- Religion: Judaism

Jewish leader
- Position: Co-founder
- Organisation: Neturei Karta
- Residence: Jerusalem

Amram Blau (Hebrew: עמרם בלאו; 1894–1974) was a Haredi rabbi in Mandatory Palestine and Israel. He was one of the founders of the fiercely anti-Zionist Neturei Karta.

== Biography ==
Blau was born in Jerusalem into the city's Hungarian Jewish community. His father was originally from Pressburg and had immigrated to Palestine in 1869, while his mother was a native of Jerusalem, with roots in the city dating to the late 18th century. He grew up in the Mea Shearim neighborhood. Like his brother Rabbi Moshe Blau, who was a leader in the Agudat Israel movement, he was also active in the Aguda during the British Mandate era and was the editor of its newspaper, Kol Israel (Voice of Israel). But when the Aguda began to lean towards a modus vivendi with the Zionist leaders, Blau claimed that the Aguda had sold out to the Zionist movement and in 1937 a vote took place within the Edah HaChareidis in which the Neturei Karta party won by a landslide, with Agudah having to set up their own court, but later Rabbi Blau broke away from the Edah HaChareidis for various controversies which he claimed proved they were going in the direction of Agudah, and founded Neturei Karta with Rabbi Aharon Katzenellenboigen.

Blau had ten children with his first wife Hinda.

== Ramasayim Tsofim ==
Blau was the secretary of an organization called Ramasayim Tsofim, which sought to build a Haredi agricultural settlement on the road to the grave of the Biblical prophet Samuel. This settlement was to follow the Halacha. Every male member, including children, was to be required to attend minyan (quorum) in the synagogue for the morning and evening prayers, and a compulsory Torah lesson lasting at least thirty minutes would be held every day after these prayers. Children under the age of 18 would be prohibited from engaging in a trade, so that they could be raised as Torah students. However, although land was purchased, the project never actually commenced.

== Anti-Zionism ==
After the establishment of the State of Israel, Neturei Karta continued its staunch opposition to a Jewish state, in agreement with the Satmar Rebbe, Rabbi Joel Teitelbaum, author of the anti-Zionist Vayoel Moshe which advocated non-recognition of the State of Israel on theological grounds. Prior to the Six-Day War, Blau even went so far as to propose moving to Jordanian controlled East Jerusalem to avoid the secular temptations of modern Israel.

He was imprisoned many times for demonstrating against public violations of Shabbat, the conscription of religious women, the opening of a mixed-gender swimming pool, and other government policies. Most of his sentences were served at the Russian Compound, but he also did a five-month stint at Ramla prison. On two occasions he went out in public wearing sackcloth as a sign of protest.

== Controversy regarding his second marriage ==
Blau's first wife, Hinda (née Weber), died in 1963. Because of an injury he sustained from shrapnel during the siege of Jerusalem in 1948, the Halakha (Jewish law) did not allow him to marry a woman who had been born Jewish. In 1965, he married Ruth Blau, a convert 26 years younger than he. Born Madeleine Lucette Ferraille (1920-2000) to a Catholic family in Calais, France, and educated at the Sorbonne, she had married her first husband Henri Baud in France on 5 September 1939. They had one child, Claude. They divorced on 31 July 1944. With the founding of Israel in 1948 she became interested in Zionism. She and Claude converted to Judaism in 1950 and went to Israel. She became interested in Judaism and then in Orthodox Judaism, and eventually embraced the anti-Zionist views of Satmar and adopted the way of life of the Neturei Karta group. She was involved in the Yossele Schumacher affair. Ruth met Amram Blau in Israel via a shidduch. The match was opposed by Blau's two adult sons and by the rabbinical court of the Edah HaChareidis, so the couple had to move to Bnei Brak, but a year later they returned to Mea Shearim.

Blau died in 1974. He was interred at Har HaMenuchot. Ruth Blau continued to act as an independent wing of Neturei Karta.
