= Moshe Aryeh Freund =

Hungarian rabbi

Moshe Aryeh Freund (Hebrew: משה אריה פרוינד; 1894–1996) was the Grand Patriarch of the Edah HaChareidis and their Chief Rabbi of Jerusalem. He wrote a book called Ateres Yehoshua, a name by which he himself was occasionally called. He was a Satmar hasid. He was born in 1904 in the Hungarian town of Honiad, where his father, Yisroel Freund, was av beis din. His mother was named Soroh. At age 18 he married a distant relative.

Before the Second World War he was rosh yeshiva in the Hungarian town of Sǎtmar (now Satu Mare, Romania). The Nazis arrested him and his entire family in 1944. The family was deported to Auschwitz, where only Freund survived; his wife and all of his nine children were killed by the Nazis.

In 1951 he moved to Jerusalem where in 1979, he was elected av beis din of the Edah HaChareidis, a position which he held until his death.
