= Yitzchok Yaakov Weiss =

- יצחק יעקב וייס
- Born: 15 February 1902; Dolyna, Austria-Hungary
- Died: 14 June 1989 (aged 87); Jerusalem, Israel
- Resting place: Mount of Olives
- Occupation: Rabbi

Rabbi Yitzchok Yaakov Weiss (Hebrew: יצחק יעקב וייס; 15 February 1902 – 14 June 1989), commonly known as the Minchas Yitzchak after the responsa he authored, was the Gran Patriarch of the Edah HaChareidis and their Chief Rabbi of Jerusalem at the time of his death, as well as a posek (decider on points of Jewish law), and Talmudic scholar. His rulings on Jewish law (halacha) are frequently cited and relied upon by rabbinic courts and scholars.

== Early life ==
Weiss was born in the town of Dolyna in Galicia, Austria-Hungary, the son of a chassidic rabbi, Yosef Yehuda Weiss, who was later head of the Hungarian Jewish community in Munkacs. He had frequent encounters with the Ziditchover Rebbe, Yehuda Zvi Eichenstein, until the age of seven when the latter died. However, with the onset of World War I in 1914, he moved with his parents to Munkacs in Hungary, where his father had lived before marrying. In 1918, the region was under the rule of independent Czechoslovakia.

Weiss studied under his father and received semicha (rabbinic ordination) from the Munkatcher Rebbe, Chaim Elazar Shapiro. Soon after, he also received semicha from Rabbi Meir Arik of Tarna. He also became close to Rabbi Shimon Greenfield. At the age of 20 he became a Rosh yeshiva (dean of a rabbinic school) in the town.

== Career before WWII ==
Weiss was the Av Beth Din (chief judge of a rabbinical court) in Grosswardein, Romania, before World War II. When Grosswardein was ceded to Hungary as a result of the Vienna Award he fled to Romania in 1944, where his wife died of an illness. When the Nazis occupied the area and sent Jews to be murdered he and his family escaped them by hiding in bunkers and attics.

== Post-World War II ==
Around 1949 he emigrated to Manchester, England, where he was soon appointed Dayan and Av Beth Din. His appointment was hailed as an important event in the religious life of English Jewry. The then-Chief Rabbi Sir Israel Brodie and his successor Rabbi Immanuel Jakobovits (then-Chief Rabbi of Ireland), were in attendance at Rabbi Weiss's induction in the Manchester Great Synagogue.

Weiss remained in Manchester until 1970. After his retirement as head of the Manchester Beth Din he joined the Edah HaChareidis in Jerusalem and became its head in 1979 when Yoel Teitelbaum died.

== Works ==
Weiss wrote a ten-volume set of responsa, Minchas Yitzchak, discussing many contemporary technological, social, and economic issues. In a section entitled Pirsumei Nissa ("publicising of the miracle") Weiss recorded the extreme ordeals that he experienced in the Second World War.

Weiss also wrote Siach Yitzchak on the Talmudic tractate Chagigah.

== Death ==
Weiss died of a heart attack at Bikur Cholim Hospital on 14 June 1989 at the age of 87.
