= Shimon Greenfeld =

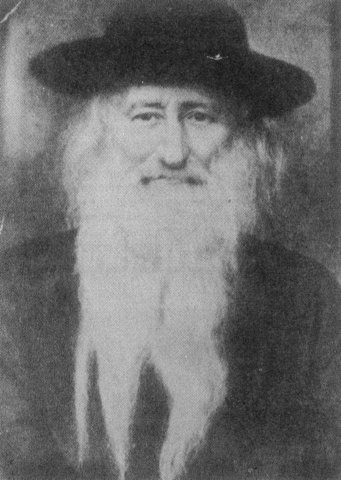
- Shimon Greenfeld
- Born: November 1, 1860; Khust, Hungary
- Died: February 9, 1930 (aged 69)
- Occupations: Rabbi, Dayan, Author
- Term: 1907-1930
- Parent: Yehudah Grunfeld

Shimon Greenfeld was born in Khust, Hungary, on 4 Cheshvan 5621 1860. His father, Yehudah Grunfeld, was rabbi of Bűdszentmihály (Tiszavasvári). He studied at the yeshivah of Harav Avraham Yehudah Schwartz, author of Kol Aryeh, in Berehove and was also a student of Rabbi Moshe Schick. He married at age 16 and later became a Dayan in Mukacheve.

Greenfeld succeeded his father as Av Beth Din of Bűdszentmihály in around 1907. His three volumes of responsa were published in Hebrew 'She'eilos U'Teshuvos Maharshag'. He also authored Zehav Shva and Maharshag al HaTorah both of which are commentaries on the Torah.

Greenfeld died on 19 Shevat 5690 1930 at the age of 69.
