= Meir Brandsdorfer =

Israeli rabbi (1934–2009)

- מאיר ברנדסדורפר

Member of the Rabbinical Court, Edah HaChareidis

Personal life
- Born: מאיר ברנדסדורפר; September 7, 1934 Antwerp, Belgium
- Died: May 13, 2009 (aged 74) Jerusalem, Israel
- Notable work: Knei Bosem series
- Occupation: Rabbi, Mohel

Religious life
- Religion: Judaism
- Denomination: Haredi Judaism, Ashkenazi

Rabbi Meir Brandsdorfer (Hebrew: מאיר ברנדסדורפר; 7 September 1934 – 13 May 2009) was a member of the Rabbinical Court of the Edah HaChareidis, the Haredi Ashkenazi community in Jerusalem, and was in charge of their Kashrut operations, especially matters of Shechita.

He was an acclaimed mohel. His responsa have been published under the title Knei Bosem.

== Biography ==
He was born on 7 September 1934, in Antwerp, Belgium, to his parents, Shlomo Brandsdorfer and Frumit Brandsdorfer(Birth name Teichtal). Following the invasion of the Low Countries by Nazi Germany in May 1940, his family fled to France. When they arrived in Paris Meir was diagnosed with tuberculosis. He was sent to Switzerland for treatment for nine months, following which he returned to his family in France.

After surviving World War II while hiding out in France, he moved to Palestine, together with his family.

He became the rabbinical leader of the Toldos Aharon Hasidic movement, based in the Jerusalem neighborhood of Meah Shearim. When Toldos Aharon's previous rebbe died, he joined the split-off group named Toldos Avraham Yitzchok. He was highly respected and eulogized by both groups upon his death.

The position of rabbinical leader in a Hasidic dynasty is not identical to that of rebbe: The rebbe is the spiritual leader, while the rabbinical leader - rabbi - is the halachic expert, who leads the group in questions of Jewish law. While in some Hasidic groups, the rebbe also fulfills the position of rabbinical leader, in other groups, this position is separate.

Brandsdorfer died suddenly at his home in Jerusalem on 13 May 2009, at the age of 74, from cardiovascular disease, and was buried in the ancient Jewish cemetery on the Mount of Olives, near the grave of the rebbe of Toldos Aharon.

His maternal grandfather was R. Yissachar Shlomo Teichtal, author of Eim HaBanim Semeicha.
