= Menachem Mendel Kasher =

Menachem Mendel Kasher מנחם מנדל כשר
- Born: March 7, 1895; Warsaw, Poland
- Died: November 3, 1983 (aged 88); Jerusalem, Israel
- Citizenship: Poland, Israel
- Writing career
- Language: Hebrew
- Notable awards: Israel Prize (1963)

Menachem Mendel Kasher (Hebrew: מנחם מנדל כשר; March 7, 1895 – November 3, 1983) was a Polish-born Israeli rabbi and prolific author who authored an encyclopedic work on the Torah entitled Torah Sheleimah.

== Early life ==
Kasher was born in 1895 in Warsaw, Poland (then part of the Russian Empire). His father was Rabbi Yitzhak Peretz. At the age of 19, he edited the periodical Degel Ha'Torah, the mouthpiece of the Polish branch of Agudath Israel.

In 1924 (or 1925), in response to a call from the Ger Rebbe, Rabbi Avraham Mordechai Alter, Kasher moved to Jerusalem, in Mandate Palestine, to establish the Sfas Emes Yeshiva in honour of the Rebbe's father, Yehudah Aryeh Leib Alter. He subsequently served as the rosh yeshiva of the yeshiva for its first two years. He later helped bring the Rebbe to Palestine about six months after the outbreak of World War II.

== Torah Sheleimah ==
Kasher's major work, Torah Sheleimah ("The Complete Torah"), is divided into two parts. The first part is the encyclopedia, the first work to publish all of the Written Law (the Pentateuch) and the Oral Teachings (Talmud and Midrashim) side by side. Kasher published from manuscript form several previously unknown midrashic works such as the Midrash Teiman. The latter part consists of the extensive annotations and addendum in which he used his awareness of variant texts as well as his almost encyclopedic knowledge in all Jewish works to clarify many obscure points in the Talmud.

The first volume of Torah Sheleimah was published in Jerusalem in 1927 and included 352 entries to the first chapter of Bereishit. The 38th volume was published in his lifetime (1983) and included Parshat Beha'alotcha.

The 39th volume was published posthumously by his son-in-law Dr. Rabbi Aaron Greenbaum and includes a short biography. The 40th volume includes an expanded biography and full list of his works.

To date, 45 volumes have been printed covering the first four chumashim (books of the Pentateuch).

== Other activities ==
He was the driving force behind the 25-volume Torah journal "Noam" and wrote many of the articles. His son Moshe Shlomo edited its 25 volumes which appeared between 1958 and 1984. Another work, Gemara Shelemah, which was to have discussed and compared variant texts of the Talmud, was never completed save for the beginning of Tractate Pesachim. He was also the editor-in-chief for the Tzafnas Paneach Institute, publishing several volumes of Rabbi Joseph Rosen's commentary on Talmud.

Rabbi Kasher was the grandfather of philosopher and linguist Asa Kasher.

== Halachic rulings ==
- He permitted an eruv in Manhattan (contrary to the ruling of Rabbi Moshe Feinstein)
- He formulated a halakhic stance on the international dateline in Jewish law
- He argued against the "Lieberman clause" as a solution to the problem of agunahs – see Get (conflict)
- In response to the establishment of the State of Israel, he advocated the drinking of a 5th cup at the Passover Seder. His request to the Chief Rabbinate that it be officially instituted was dismissed.

== Awards and honours ==
- In 1963, Rabbi Kasher was awarded the Israel Prize in Rabbinic literature.
- He was awarded an honorary doctorate from Yeshiva University.

== Published works ==
- Torah Sheleimah — an encyclopedic work on the Torah
- HaTekufah HaGedolah (Jerusalem 1969) — a treatise explaining the meaning of our times according to Judaism, and which was a rebuttal to the Satmar Rav's work, VaYoel Moshe, in which the Satmar Rav explains his view that Zionism was against halacha.
- HaMechilta DeRashbi VeHaRambam (New York 1943) — a discussion of the relationship between the Rambam's (i.e., Maimonides') Mishneh Torah and a recently published midrash.
- Divrei Menachem — responsa from many of the foremost scholars of the day, including the Rogatchover Gaon and the Klei Chemda. 4 volumes were published; in 1977, 1980, 1981 and 1983.
- Haggada Sheleimah (New York 1961) — an encyclopedic work on the Pesach Haggada
- Haggadat Pessach EretzYisraelit (New York 1950, Jerusalem 1976)- the Kasher Haggada - with a short running explanation. This was one of the first haggadot to be translated into English with commentary.
- Haggda Leil Shimurim (Jerusalem 1983) - includes about 100 "Pesach-related" sayings from the 5 sages who are mentioned in the Haggada.
- Arab'at Haroim discussing the opinions of 4 earlier Rabbis about the upcoming redemption
- Kuntres haKotel Hama'arivi (Jerusalem 1981) was published anonymously and has 9 chapters about the Western Wall.
- Kav Hata'arich (Jerusalem 1977) - discusses the date line in Jewish law. It includes full color maps and the 3 major opinions on the subject as well as his own, a 4th opinion.
- Sefer Shma Yisrael (Jerusalem 1980) and includes about 500 sayings on the first chapter of the Shma.
- HaAdam al HaYareach -"The man on the moon" (Jerusalem 1970) - A treatise on the effects of the Apollo 11 moon landing on Jewish philosophy.

== See also ==
- List of Israel Prize recipients
