= Aharon Roth =

Hungarian Hasidic rabbi (1894–1947)

- אהרן ראטה
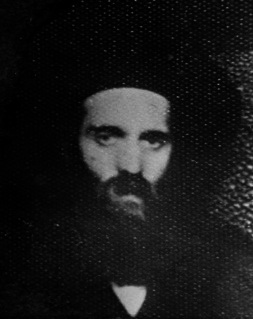
- Born: 1894; Ungvár, Austria-Hungary
- Died: 1947 (aged 52–53); Jerusalem, Mandatory Palestine

Aharon Roth or Aaron Rote (Hebrew: אהרן ראטה) known as Reb Arele (1894 – 1947), was a Hungarian Hasidic rebbe and Talmudic scholar. He first established a Hasidic community he called Shomer Emunim (Guardian of Faith) in the 1920s in Satu Mare and in the 1930s in Berehovo, before he settled in Jerusalem, where he also founded a Hasidic community of the same name. His main work is the two-volume Shomer Emunim, written in 1942 in reaction to the news about the Nazi atrocities in Eastern Europe.

After his death, the sect split into two groups. One, who adopted the name Shomrei Emunim, followed his son, Rabbi Avrohom Chayim (1924 - 2012), the other followed his son-in-law and became known as Toldot Aharon (Generations of Aharon) of which the Toldot Avrohom Yitzchok later split off.

== Life ==
Roth was born in Ungvár, Hungary, today Uzhhorod in Ukraine, an outsider to the Hasidic world. He was unusually pious and ascetic from an early age. Until the age of 20, he studied Talmud in Vác under Yeshayahu Silberstein, a Hungarian scholar, and then with Hasidic rabbis from Galicia, who had fled to Hungary during World War I, including Yissachar Dov Rokeach of Belz and Tzvi Elimelech Spira of Błażowa. He also spent a period of time in the courtyard of Israel Hager of Viznitz, author of Ahavas Yisrael. Leading to a very strong relationship between the two families until today. On the latter's instruction, Roth establish a hasidic community in Satu Mare, where he settled in 1920, a few years after his marriage. In 1925 he went to Jerusalem, where he also gained supporters, and returned to Satu Mare four years later. In 1936 he went to Berehovo (Beregszász) in Czechoslovakia, after the conflict between him and the followers of Satmar's Hasidic rabbi Joel Teitelbaum had escalated to open physical violence. In 1939 Roth settled in Jerusalem, where he again attracted devoted followers. The synagogue he established in the Mea Shearim quarter became known for the ecstatic mood of those who pray there.

After his death in 1947, he was succeeded by his son Abraham Chaim Roth, the rebbe of the Shomer Emunim, and his son-in-law Abraham Isaac Kohn, who became the rebbe of the Toldot Aharon group.

== Views ==
In Roth’s book Taharas HaKodesh, published in 1930, he predicted a big catastrophe happening in the near future due to immodest dress and not protecting the covenant. In this context he cited the Zohar (Noach 66b) which states that when Jews observe the Holy Covenant (Bris Kodesh) properly no other people can have any power over them. Roth criticized the struggles and scandals within many of the Hasidic dynasties, accusing them of not following the early tsadikim's emphasis on simple prayer and piety. Rejecting all compromise with modern views and ways of life, he called for repentance, demanded complete adherence to simple faith and ecstatic mode of praying, and expected his Hasidim to support themselves by their own labor. He defined the group as a holy fraternity and gave guidelines for distinctive behavior, dress, and hairstyle, particularly deploring the decline of modesty. He regarded the Holocaust as a punishment for abandoning simple faith and ancient traditions, and constantly called for repentance.

== Writings ==
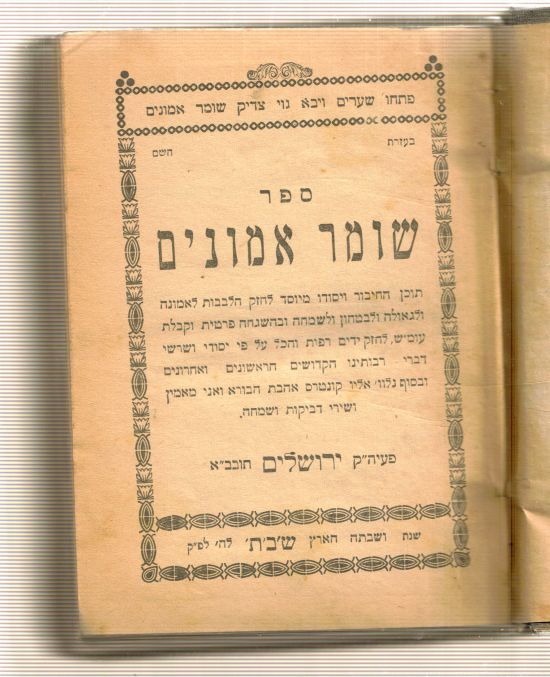
Sefer Shomer Emunim

Roth was the author of several works of modern-day Hasidic literature:

- טהרת הקודש (Taharath HaKodesh) (1930) on Hasidic moral development (First Volume Second Volume at HebrewBooks.org);
- שולחן הטהור (Shulchan HaTahor) (1933) on pious table etiquette and related matters;
- נועם הלבבות (Noam HaLevavot) (1934) on belief, practice, and repentance (Hebrew text at HebrewBooks.org);
- שומר אמונים (Shomer Emunim) (1942) which contains the mystical tract Hitragshut HaNefesh (Agitation of the Soul), is a two-volume collection of homilies about faith, providence, reward, punishment and guidelines for pietistic behavior to secure Israel's redemption, written at a time, when news from the Nazi atrocities in Eastern Europe reached the outside world; (First Volume Second Volume at HebrewBooks.org);
- אוסף מכתבים (Osef Mikhtavim) (1943);
- מבקש אמונה (Mevakesh Emunah) (1943) Hebrew text at HebrewBooks.org.

His ethical will was published as Kuntres Tsavaah in 1947. His works, including new volumes based on his written manuscripts, continue to be published by his followers. A selection of his writings was published in English translation by Zalman Schachter-Shalomi and Yair Hillel Goelman.
