= Three Oaths =

Principle of Jewish thought and Talmudic passage

The Three Oaths is the name for a midrash found in the Babylonian Talmud, and midrash anthologies, that interprets three verses from Song of Solomon as God imposing three oaths upon the world. Two oaths pertain to the Jewish people and a third oath applies to the gentile nations of the world. For their part, Jews were sworn not to "ascend as a wall" to reclaim Land of Israel and not to "rebel against the nations of the world." In turn, the other nations were sworn not to "subjugate the Jews excessively."

Among Orthodox Jews today there are primarily two ways of viewing this midrash. Haredim who are strongly anti-Zionist often view this midrash as legally binding, and therefore the movement to establish the state of Israel and its continued existence would be a violation of Jewish law, whereas Religious Zionists have the view that either the oaths are no longer applicable or that they are indeed binding, but the current movement is not a violation of them. Both buttress their positions by citing historic rabbinic sources in favor of their view.

== The midrash and its prooftext ==
The three oaths are derived from Biblical verses during a sugya, or Talmudic passage, about Zeira's desire to move from Babylonia to the Land of Israel. Zeirva realizes that his teacher, Rav Yosef, considers it a Biblical sin to leave Babylonia for the land of Israel. The sugya begins on Ketubot 110b and continues on 111a (where the Three Oaths are plainly conveyed). The Gemara quotes Jose bar Hanina:

ג' שבועות הללו למה אחת שלא יעלו ישראל בחומה ואחת שהשביע הקדוש ברוך הוא את ישראל שלא ימרדו באומות העולם ואחת שהשביע הקדוש ברוך הוא את אומות העולם שלא ישתעבדו בהן בישראל יותר מדאי.

Why/What are these Three Oaths? One, that Israel should not go up [to the land] in a wall {i.e. en masse, RaShI interprets: forcefully}. Two, the Holy One adjured Israel not to rebel against the nations of the world. Three, the Holy One adjured the nations that they would not oppress Israel too much.

The Midrash is, in large part, an explanation of three verses in the Song of Songs with the phrase "I adjure you". The midrashic exegesis of these verses is consistent with the traditionalist understanding of the entire book as an allegory for the relationship between God and the Jewish people. The three verses are:

- Song of Solomon 2:7: הִשְׁבַּעְתִּי אֶתְכֶם בְּנוֹת יְרוּשָׁלִַם, בִּצְבָאוֹת, אוֹ, בְּאַיְלוֹת הַשָּׂדֶה: אִם-תָּעִירוּ וְאִם-תְּעוֹרְרוּ אֶת-הָאַהֲבָה, עַד שֶׁתֶּחְפָּץ., lit. 'I adjure you, O daughters of Jerusalem, by the gazelles, and by the hinds of the field, that ye awaken not, nor stir up love, until it please.'
- Song of Solomon 3:5: identical to 2:7.
- Song of Solomon 8:4: הִשְׁבַּעְתִּי אֶתְכֶם, בְּנוֹת יְרוּשָׁלִָם: מַה-תָּעִירוּ וּמַה-תְּעֹרְרוּ אֶת-הָאַהֲבָה, עַד שֶׁתֶּחְפָּץ., lit. 'I adjure you, O daughters of Jerusalem: Why should ye awaken, or stir up love, until it please?'

Versions of the oaths also appear in midrash anthologies. Song of Songs Rabbah has two additional oaths for Israel: to not "force the end" and not reveal secrets. Midrash Tanchuma on Deuteronomy has three oaths for Israel: to not reveal the end, not force the end, and not rebel. Ravitzky also sees the idea of the oaths in an earlier, tannaitic midrash, Mekhilta of Rabbi Ishmael.

== Viewpoint of the rishonim ==
=== Maimonides ===
Maimonides cited the Three Oaths in his famous Epistle to Yemen, written around 1173. In this letter, Maimonides attempted to strengthen the morale of the Yemenite Jews, who were suffering from a decree of forced conversion to Islam as well as a false messianic movement that led many Yemenite Jews away from traditional practice. In the letter he states:

ולפי שידע שלמה ע"ה ברוח הקדש שהאומה הזו כאשר תלכד בגלות תיזום להתעורר שלא

בזמן הראוי ויאבדו בכך וישיגום הצרות הזהיר מכך והשביע עליו על דרך המשל ואמר

השבעתי אתכם בנות ירושלים וכו

Solomon, of blessed memory, foresaw with Divine inspiration, that the prolonged duration of the exile would incite some of our people to seek to terminate it before the proper time, and as a consequence they would perish or meet with disaster. Therefore he warned them (to desist) from it and adjured them in metaphorical language, as we read, "I adjure you, O daughters of Jerusalem, by the gazelles and by the hinds of the field, that ye awaken not, nor stir up love, until it please." Now, brethren and friends, abide by the oath, and stir not up love until it please.

=== Bahya ben Asher ===
The 13th-century commentator Rabbeinu Bachya wrote in his commentary on Genesis 32:8:

... and it is written "And Hezekiah prayed before God". So too we are required to follow in the way of the Patriarchs and to restore ourselves so that we may be graciously accepted and with our fine language and prayer before God, may He be exalted. However, to wage war is not possible, "you have been adjured daughters of Jerusalem, etc." You have been adjured not to engage in war with the nations.

=== Nachmanides ===
Ramban did not explicitly discuss the Three Oaths, however he did maintain that it is incumbent upon Jews in every generation as a positive commandment to attempt to repossess the Land of Israel:

That we are commanded to take possession of the Land which the Almighty, Blessed Be He, gave to our forefathers, to Avraham, to Yitzchak, and to Yaakov; and not to abandon it to other nations, or to leave it desolate, as He said to them, "You shall dispossess the inhabitants of the Land and dwell in it, for I have given the Land to you to possess it," and he said, further, "To Inherit the Land which I swore to your forefathers (to give them)"; behold, we are commanded with the conquest of the land in every generation.

This implies that the Three Oaths are not Halachically binding, as to treat them as binding would effectively nullify a biblical commandment.

Nachmanides continues to say this command applies in every generation, even during exile:

[The sages] made many other such emphatic statements regarding this positive commandment that we are commanded to possess the Land and settle it. It is therefore an eternal positive command, obligating every single individual even during the time of Exile as is known from the Talmud in many places.

==== Anti-Zionist responses ====
In general, the counts of 613 commandments excludes one-time commandments (such as God's command to count the Jews in Numbers 1:2). According to Rabbi Joel Teitelbaum, Nachmanides' words "we are commanded with the conquest of the land in every generation" mean only the generations until the era of exile, not all generations. Nevertheless (according to Teitelbaum's understanding of Nachmanides) since the commandment applied for multiple generations and not just at one moment, it qualifies to be listed among the 613 commandments.

==== Other attempts to reconcile Nachmanides with the Three Oaths ====
Rashbash (himself a descendant of Nachmanides) understood this particular biblical obligation to be binding on the individual level but not on the collective:

In truth, this commandment is not a commandment which includes the entirety of Israel in the Exile which now exists, but it is a general principle as our Sages stated in the Talmud in Ketubot, that it stems from the Oaths which The Holy One, Blessed be He, made Israel swear not to rush the End, and not to ascend like a wall.

Rabbi Chaim Zimmerman distinguished between settling the land and conquering the land. He said the commandment is realized by settling the land, and conquering is merely a preparation for the core obligation of settlement. The obligation to settle the land does not necessarily violate the Three Oaths. Rabbi Zimmerman adds that the Three Oaths only apply to invading the land from the outside, and once Jews have arrived in the land with the permission of non-Jews, they may then fight for control of the land. He writes:

... the difficulty in the Ramban which says that the mitzva of kibush prevails in our time against the oath, dissolves. The oath, shelo yaalu bechoma means explicitly that we cannot storm eretz-Yisrael from chutz-laaretz. But when the Jews are in eretz-Yisrael, there is surely a hechsher mitzva of kibbush-haaretz. How can the Jews be in eretz-Yisrael without the aliyah "bechoma"? The answer is very simple. If many Jews came to eretz-Yisrael individually, or by permission of the nations, then once they are there, there is a command of kibbush.... There was never an oath upon the people who were in eretz-Yisrael.

== Viewpoint of the early Acharonim ==
=== Maharal ===
Maharal discussed the Three Oaths in two locations, in his work Netzach Yisrael and in his commentary to Tractate Ketubot. In his work Netzach Yisrael he wrote:

כי פירוש 'בדורו של שמד' היינו במדה שהיה לדורו של שמד, שהיו דביקים בה דורו של שמד, ובאותה מדה השביע אותם שלא ישנו בענין הגלות. כי דורו של שמד, אף על גב שהגיע להם המיתה בגלות, לא היו משנים. ועוד פירוש 'בדורו של שמד', רוצה לומר אף אם יהיו רוצים להמית אותם בעינוי קשה, לא יהיו יוצאים ולא יהיו משנים בזה. וכן הפירוש אצל כל אחד ואחד, ויש להבין זה

Another explanation of the Midrash's statement (he is speaking of Shir Ha-Shirim Rabba 2:20 that begins "ורבנן אמרי השביען בדורו של שמד") that God adjured the Jewish people in a generation of Shmad (religious persecution Jews, or decrees against Jews): that even if they will threaten to kill them with difficult torture, they will not leave [the Exile] nor will they change their behavior in this manner

However, in his commentary to Ketubot the Maharal explains that the Oaths are rather heavenly decrees, necessary to maintain the unnatural state of exile:

שבועות הללו וכו'. פי' כאשר הש"י גזר הגלות על ישראל, והגלות הזה אינו לפי הסדר שראוי להיות בעולם, כי לא תמצא שהאומה יהי' גולה ויהי' יושבים בתוך ארץ אומה אחרת, רק כל אומה ואומה היא תחת רשותה, והש"י גזר הגלות על ישראל והגלות הזה אינו לפי סדר הראוי שיהיה בעולם ולפיכך היה הש"י גוזר קיום על גלותם. ואם לא הייתה הגזירה הזאת על דבר שהוא כנגד הסדר, אין לו קיום כי הסדר גובר עליו. ומפני זה היו ג' שבועות, כלומר ג' גזירות

"These oaths" etc. This refers to when the Lord, blessed be he, decreed exile on Israel; and this exile is not according to the proper order of the world, as you will not find a nation that is exiled and dwells in the land of another nation, but every nation and nation is under its own authority. And [indeed] the Lord, blessed be he, decreed exile on Israel, and this exile is not according to the proper order of the world, and therefore the Lord, blessed be he, decrees their exile's being. And if not for this decree on that which is against the order, it [which is against the order] could not exist for order prevails. And thus were three oaths, that is three decrees

=== Rabbi Chaim Vital ===
The 16th Century Kabbalist, Rabbi Chaim Vital expressed the view that the Three Oaths were only binding for the first thousand years of Exile. He wrote:

'I made you swear, daughters of Jerusalem...' this great oath to God was that they should not arouse the Redemption until that love will be desired and with good will, as it is written 'until I desire,' and our Sages already said that the time of this oath is a thousand years, as it is written in the Baraita of Rabbi Yishmael in Pirkei Heichalot (in a comment on Daniel 7:25)..., and similarly in the Zohar II:17a...that it is one day of the Exile of the Community of Israel...

== Modern era ==
=== Debate on the appropriate understanding of Maimonides ===
Religious Zionists suggest that in Maimonides' Epistle to Yemen, he explicitly interprets the oaths metaphorically, and not literally. As it states there "Therefore he admonished and adjured them in metaphorical language (דרך המשל, lit. by way of metaphor) to desist." Therefore, they maintain, that Maimonides did not consider them to be Halachically binding.

A member of the Haredi community, Rabbi Chaim Walkin points out in his book, Da'at Chaim, that Maimonides discussed the Three Oaths only in the Epistle to Yemen, but not in his Halachic work, the Mishne Torah. R. Walkin postulates that this is because while Maimonides saw these oaths as important, he did not consider them to be legally binding as Halacha, only that they serve as "warnings that these actions would be unsuccessful".

Rabbi Joel Teitelbaum (the Satmar Rebbe) however, noted that Maimonides cites the Three Oaths in Iggeret Teiman, in a way that makes it appear that he is discussing binding Halachah. In using the description "metaphorical", Maimonides is referring to the nature of the text of the Song of Songs, and not to the Three Oaths themselves. The Satmar Rebbe however did not consider the breaking of the oaths a halachic issue, but rather a form of heresy. He stated that "the oath was not given to heretics but to all Jewry; and even if the whole Government were pious like men of old, any attempt to take their freedom prematurely would be to deny the Holy Law and our faith." As for Nachmanides' explicit statement that the commandment applies even during exile, Teitelbaum says this refers to living in Israel as an individual - not conquering, since that would conflict with the Three Oaths. A variant of this approach says that Nachmanides' command to live in Israel even during exile applies only when living in Israel is consistent with exile, that is, when a non-Jewish government rules the land. But living under a Jewish government such as the State of Israel might itself constitute a violation of the oath. Nachmanides felt no need to mention this exception to the commandment because he did not foresee the rise of a Jewish government in the Holy Land before the messiah.

Neturei Karta stress what is said in the mussaf Shemona Esrei ("The Standing Prayer") of Yom Tov, that because of their sins, the Jewish people went into exile from the Land of Israel ("umipnei chatoeinu golinu meiartzeinu"). Additionally, they maintain the view – based on the Babylonian Talmud – that any form of forceful recapture of the Land of Israel is a violation of divine will. They believe that the restoration of the Land of Israel to the Jews should happen only with the coming of the Messiah, not by self-determination.

James A. Diamond and Menachem Kellner argue that Maimonides not only left out any mention of the Three Oaths from his code of Halachic law, but that he actually argued that Jewish national independence would come about through human initiative and advocated political activism to try to restore Jewish independence in the Land of Israel. They write that Teitelbaum came up with twisted interpretations of Maimonides' writings to fit his own ideology, for example by claiming that Maimonides' silence on the oaths in his Halachic code was because they were supposedly of such great importance that they did not need to be mentioned. According to Diamond and Kellner, "there is simply no plausible reading of Maimonides’ activist realization of the Jewish return to and settlement of Israel as a necessary stage in bringing about the messianic period that would not run afoul of Teitelbaum's “oaths” argument".

=== Debate on the appropriate understanding of Maharal ===
Religious Zionists argue that Maharal considered the oaths to be a Divine decree (which has thus subsequently expired). They rely upon his commentary to Ketubot which more explicitly indicates that he understood the Oaths to be binding insofar as it is up to God to permit the circumstances wherein Jews can engage in said activities, but it is not binding insofar as Jews are not actually prohibited from engaging in the acts the Oaths are concerned with. They maintain that there is a certain degree of ambiguity in what he has written in Netzach Yisrael and therefore his position must be seen in such a manner, for "anything to the contrary yields a contradiction within the Maharal's own writings", which would clearly be undesirable.

However, the position of Rabbi Joel Teitelbaum (the Satmar Rebbe) in respect to whether Maharal understood the Oaths as prohibitively binding upon Jews is based primarily upon what was written in Netzach Yisrael. It is uncertain whether he considered and factored in Maharal's position in his commentary on Ketubot. (Whether this is due to his not having had access to it, not having been aware of it, or having viewed the text as a forgery is unknown.) However, according to his understanding of the Maharal any violation of the Oaths is absolutely prohibited, even on pain of death.

In response to Zionists who quote the Maharal's commentary on Ketubot, anti-Zionist writers have said that even if the oaths are to be seen as decrees, it was obviously not God's intent that the Jewish people should keep trying to return to the Land of Israel and build a state until they hit the right moment. In view of the harsh consequences of failure ("I will declare your flesh ownerless like the gazelles and hinds of the field"), this would be as foolish as playing Russian roulette. Furthermore, the success of the State of Israel so far is not proof that the decree has been annulled, since the future of the state is still uncertain.

=== Anti-Zionist arguments that consider the Three Oaths ===
An overview of some of the primary claims made by anti-Zionists concerning the Three Oaths:

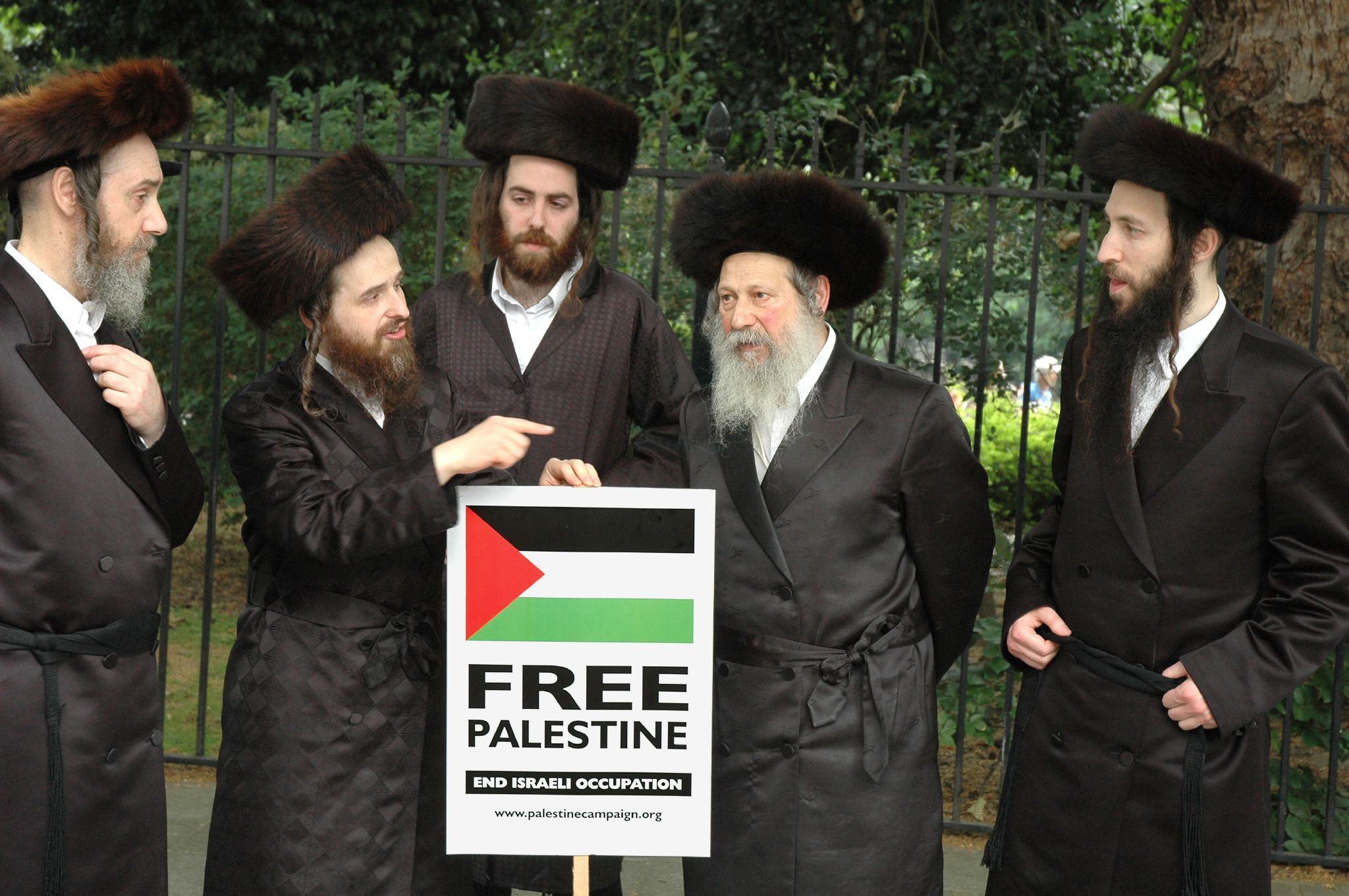
Members of Neturei Karta Orthodox Jewish group protest against Israel

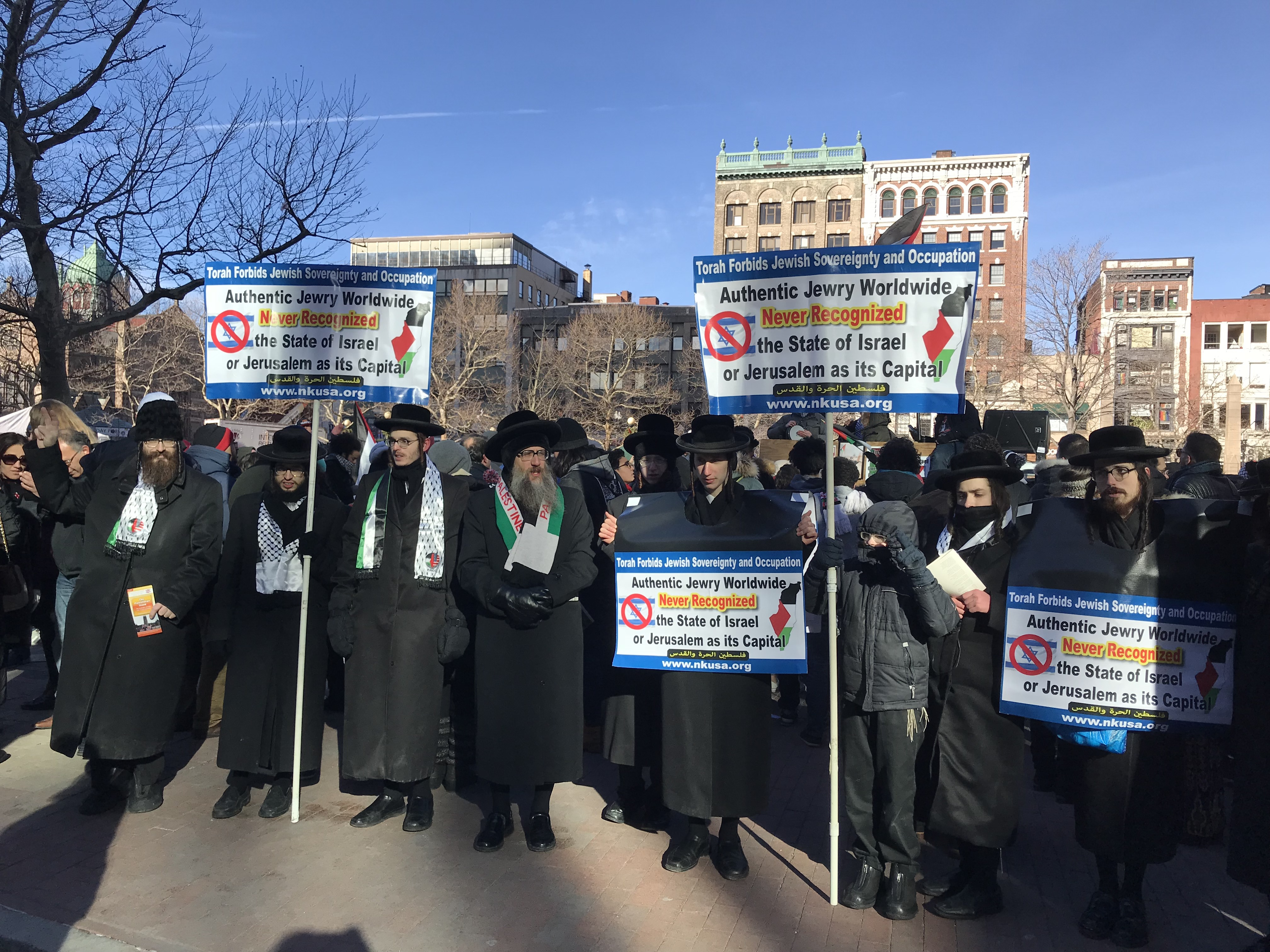
Neturei Karta members at an event in Boston, Massachusetts

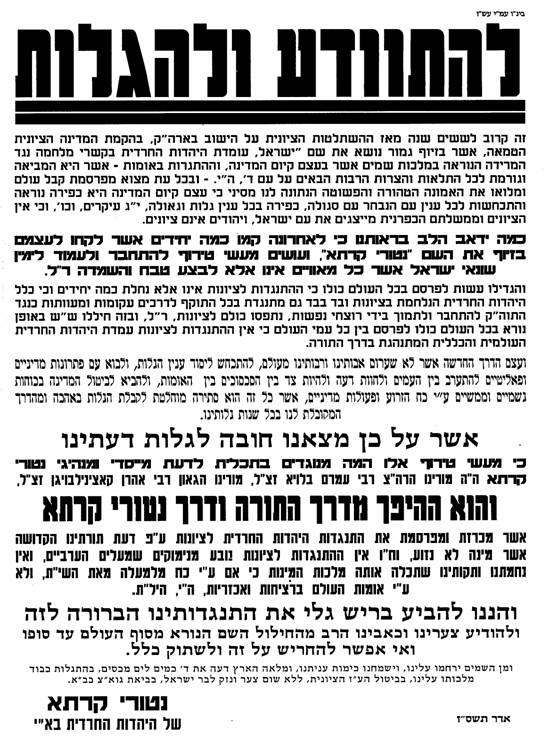
Condemnation poster, or pashkvil

- Although the Three Oaths are Aggadic in style, precedent shows when Aggadic material in the Talmud presents novel legal material (as opposed to punishments and rewards relating to legal material expounded elsewhere in the Talmud), that material is codified as halacha, unless there is a specific reason not to.
- Even if the oaths are to be seen as decrees, the existence of the modern State of Israel does not constitute proof that the decree has ended, because the state's future is still uncertain.
- The Satmar Rebbe, in his book Vayoel Moshe maintains that Maimonides spoke of the Three Oaths as binding. (See Modern Debate on the Appropriate Understanding of Maimonides above)
- The oaths are between the Jewish people and God, and the gentiles and God respectively. The fact that the gentiles violated their oath does not tacitly mean that the Jewish people are free to do so as well. Historically, atrocities prior to the Holocaust have generally not prompted rabbinic encouragement of mass immigration to Israel, though there have been some notable exceptions.
- Living in Eretz Yisroel is not a general mitzvah for the Jews collectively, only individuals (see discussion of Rashbash (Solomon ben Simon Duran) in Nachmanides section above).
- The Balfour Declaration never covered the Oaths.
- The State of Israel has expanded its borders beyond the areas mandated by the UN and have thus expanded the borders without the permission of the nations.
- The United Nations' approval of the establishment of the State of Israel does not constitute permission from the nations of the world. The Halacha attaches no significant value to the United Nations. The relevant approval should be that of some of the other people who live in the land (in this instance, the Palestinian Arabs).
- In response to the Zionists' use of Rabbi Chaim Vital (see below), the Satmar Rebbe argued that Vital's remarks refer not to the Three Oaths incumbent on the Jewish people, but to God's oath not to redeem the Jewish people unless they repent out of love. This oath lasts a thousand years; after that point even repentance out of fear can bring the redemption.
- In response to questions of why God would allow the Zionists some measure of success if Zionism is against the Talmud; anti-Zionist religious Jews respond with the following; "The fallacy of the argument lies in the undeniable fact that there is evil in this world. Hashem allows people free will to choose to do wrong, and even to be successful in doing wrong on a large scale.... Why Hashem decided to grant their efforts some degree of success is one of the mysteries of our era. But the fact that they succeeded is no more a proof that they were doing the right thing, than is the fact that the Germans succeeded in killing six million Jews a proof that they were doing the right thing."

=== Zionist arguments that consider the Three Oaths ===
An overview of some of the primary claims made by Religious Zionists concerning the Three Oaths:

- The Three Oaths are an aggadic midrash, and therefore they are not Halakhically obligatory (Aggadic Midrashim, as opposed to Halachic Midrashim are not traditionally understood as a valid source for Halacha). Accordingly, Maimonides' Mishne Torah, the Arba'ah Turim, the Shulchan Aruch, and other halachic sources do not cite the Three Oaths or rule accordingly. They are not found there at all. Maimonides himself advocated the re-establishment of Jewish sovereignty in the Land of Israel through human initiative rather than waiting for the Messiah.
- It is not clearly established in either the Gemara or the Halacha what precisely would constitute permission from the nations. As such, the Balfour Declaration, San Remo conference, United Nations General Assembly Resolution 181, and the League of Nations-issued Mandate for Palestine plan of July 24, 1922 is understood as representing permission and approval from the nations of the world. Accordingly, the Jewish people cannot be considered to have rebelled against the nations. This was the opinion of Rabbi Meir Simcha of Dvinsk regarding the Balfour Declaration.
- The Balfour Declaration, San Remo Resolution, League of Nations Mandate of Palestine, and United Nations resolution recommending the establishment of a Jewish State fulfill the first condition of the oath to not rebel against the nations. Thus, when the United Nations told the Jews to go home, it was mandatory that they do so. Just as Cyrus instructed the Jews of Babylonia to construct the Second Temple. This position is held by Eliezer Waldenberg and others.
- The Three Oaths simply meant that God had decreed an exile for the Jewish people. The fact that the Jewish people have successfully returned to the Land of Israel, and that the State of Israel has survived, is evidence that the oath is void and the decree has ended.
- The wording of Maimonides in his Epistle to Yemen specifically states that the Oaths are "metaphorical" (see Maimonides above), furthermore in his Halachic work he places great value upon living in the Land of Israel, and forbids leaving it.
- Although the Three Oaths were obligatory in the past, the gentiles violated their vow by excessively persecuting the Jewish people. Therefore, the validity of the two other vows has been nullified. Religious Zionists point to a specific Midrash warning that if gentile nations violated this oath, then "they cause the End of Days to come prematurely." This has been interpreted to mean that Israel's re-establishment would be implemented sooner than originally intended. With atrocities against Jews throughout history, and especially after The Holocaust, the Jewish people were absolved of their part of the Oaths. Those who hold this position often rely on the Shulchan Aruch which states: "two [persons] who have taken an oath to do a thing, and one of them violates the oath, the other is exempt [from it] and does not require permission." As a result, the ban on mass-immigration to the Land of Israel became void, and Zionism and the State of Israel arose as a direct result of the breach by gentile nations of the Oaths. The Holocaust was the greatest violation of the 3 oaths
- Religious Zionists often point to Israel's seemingly miraculous survival in the numerous Arab-Israeli wars, especially the 1948 Arab-Israeli War and Six-Day War, and interpret this as the State of Israel being preserved directly by God's hand.
- The Jewish people did not return en masse to the Land of Israel, but rather through individual immigration as well as a series of five Aliyahs. Jews continue to individually immigrate to Israel today. There was never a point in history where a majority of world Jewry collectively migrated to the Land of Israel.
- Many authorities understand the oath of "not ascending as a wall" as only including an immigration of the entire (or at least a majority of the) nation. Some of these authorities also require that this mass immigration be one of force in order for the oath to be considered violated. Among those who hold these positions are Isaiah Achron, the Shittah Mekubetzet, the Maharal, Samuel Ben Isaac Jaffe Ashkenazi, Jonathan Eybeschutz, Yisroel ben Shmuel of Shklov and students of the Vilna Gaon, Meir Blumenfeld, Maimonides as understood by Joel Teitelbaum, and Yonah Dov Blumberg. Similarly, Baruch Epstein, in his Torah Temimah, understands the oath to only include a forceful mass immigration, and Ishtori Haparchi in his Kaftor Vaferach understands the oath to mean immigration with intent to conquer. Isaac Leon ibn Zur in his Megillat Ester on Nachmanides also understands the oath as prohibiting conquest.

Many Haredim who subscribe to the anti-Zionist view still immigrate to the Land of Israel. Their rationalization is that they do so only as individuals and families, but not as members of the organized mass-immigration, and that they come to the Land solely to live there, not in order to conquer it or rule over it. Such Haredim accordingly do not believe themselves to be in violation of the Three Oaths. Other Orthodox Jewish movements, including some who oppose Zionism, have denounced the activities of the radical branch of Neturei Karta. According to The Guardian, "[e]ven among Haredi, or ultra-Orthodox circles, the Neturei Karta are regarded as a wild fringe". Neturei Karta is sometimes confused with Satmar, due to both being anti-Zionist; however, they are separate groups and have had disagreements. For example, Satmar criticized Neturei Karta for attending a 2006 Holocaust denial conference in Iran. Neturei Karta asserts that the mass media deliberately downplays their viewpoint and makes them out to be few in number. Their protests in America are usually attended by, at most, a few dozen people. In Israel, the group's protests typically attract several hundred participants, depending on the nature of the protest and its location.

Neturei Karta's website states that its members "frequently participate[s] in public burning of the Israeli flag." On the Jewish holiday of Purim, Neturei Karta members have routinely burned Israeli flags in celebrations in cities such as London, Brooklyn and Jerusalem.

While many in Neturei Karta chose to simply ignore the State of Israel, this has become more difficult. Some took steps to condemn Israel and bring about its eventual dismantling until the coming of the Messiah. Chief among these was Moshe Hirsch, leader of an activist branch of Neturei Karta, who served in Yasser Arafat's cabinet as Minister for Jewish Affairs.

== See also ==
- Aliyah
- Anti-Zionism
- Haredim and Zionism
- Religious Zionism
- Vayoel Moshe
