= Vayoel Moshe =

Hebrew book by Rabbi Joel Teitelbaum

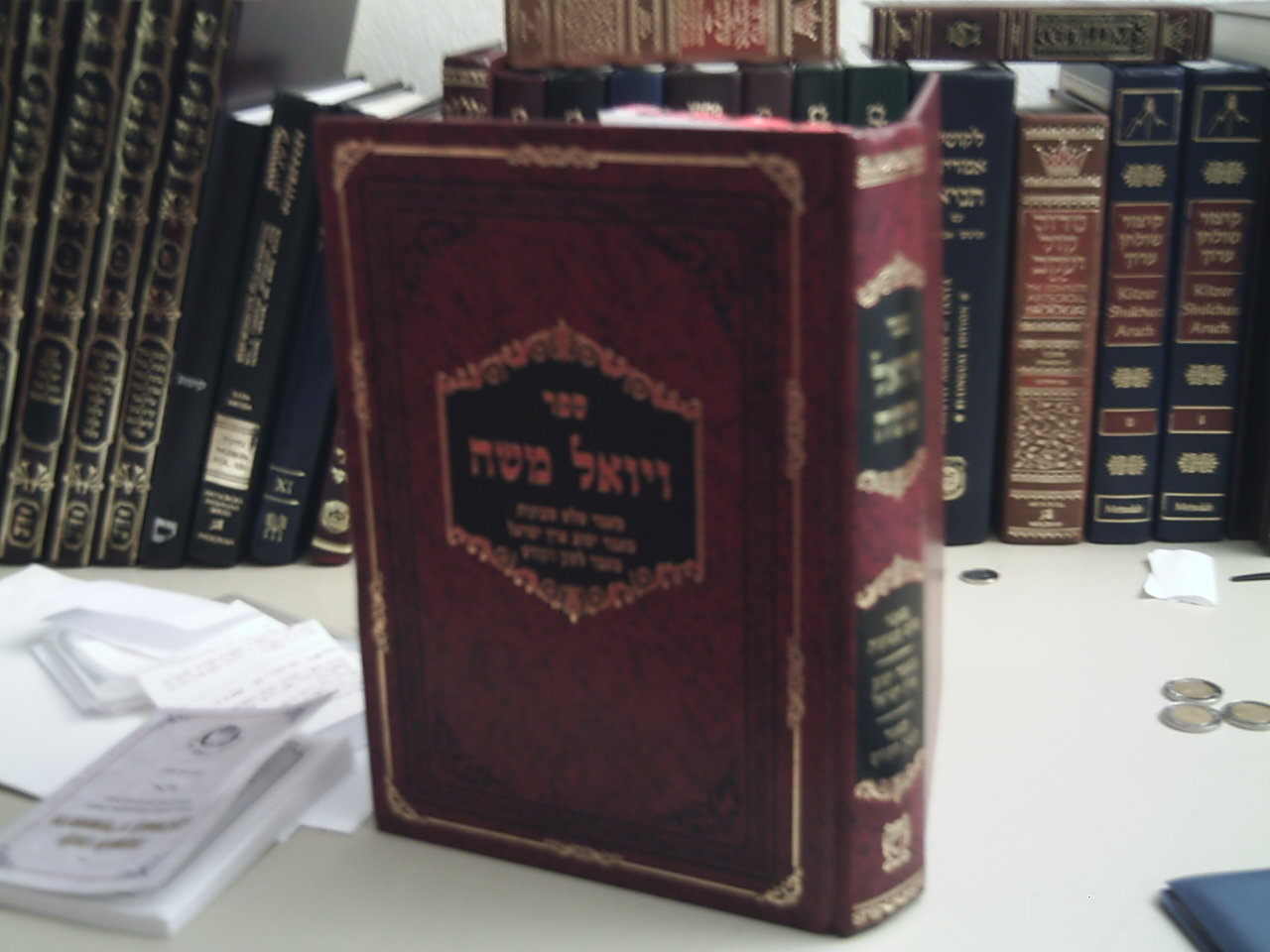
The book Vayoel Moshe

Vayoel Moshe (Hebrew: ויואל משה) is a Hebrew book written in 1961 by Rabbi Joel Teitelbaum, founder of the Satmar Hasidic movement. In it, Teitelbaum argues that Zionism is incompatible with Judaism.

As Teitelbaum explains in the introduction, the book's title is taken from the biblical verse of Exodus 2:21, and hints to Teitelbaum's first name (Yoel), and to his great-great-grandfather, Moshe Teitelbaum. The verse, which states, "And Moses agreed to stay ... an alien in a foreign land", hints to Teitelbaum's conclusion that the Jewish people should remain in exile.

The book is considered to be Teitelbaum's magnum opus, and is of the utmost importance to Satmar Hasidim, as well as to other Haredim who follow the Satmar doctrine regarding Zionism. Satmar Hasidism has many institutions, buildings, and neighborhoods named after the book.

Vayoel Moshe is primarily a book of Halacha, Jewish law. However, it draws on Rabbinic Jewish philosophy as well.

Although Teitelbaum's obligation to follow anti-Zionism is a minority position in Judaism since the early 20th century, some Jewish scholars such as Shaul Magid, believe the text should be more widely known and understood, even among opponents of those beliefs.

== Structure ==
The book consists of three parts:

1. Maamar Shalosh Shevuos (Treatise regarding the Three Oaths), is an in-depth analysis of the Three Oaths and their practical halachic implications.

The "Three Oaths" are originally detailed by the Talmud in tractate Ketubot. The Talmud discusses a passage from the Song of Songs in the Tanakh (Hebrew Bible) in which God made the Israelites promise "to wait for Him before arousing his love", as "King Solomon in Song of Songs thrice adjured the daughters of Jerusalem not to arouse or bestir the love until it is ready". The Talmud explains that the Jewish people are bound by three oaths:

- Not to ascend to Eretz Yisrael "like a wall" (i. e., in a strong manner).
- Not to rebel against the nations of the world.
- For the nations of the world not to oppress them too much.

The Talmud follows the discussion of the oaths with a strong warning:

... Rabbi Elazar said: The Holy One, Blessed be He, said to the Jewish people: If you fulfill the oath, it is good, and if not, I will abandon your flesh, and all will devour you like the gazelles and like the hinds of the field.

Teitelbaum discusses the legal status of the oaths, and what they imply. He argues that while the oaths are clearly metaphorical, and do not have the legal status of actual oaths, they are to be understood as guidelines for what is considered to be an attempt to leave exile before divine redemption, which he posits is severely forbidden and is tantamount to heresy.

2. Maamar Yishuv Eretz Yisroel (Treatise about settling the Land of Israel), which seeks to clarify if there is a halachic obligation to dwell in the land of Israel, as well as general halachic concerns regarding Jews emigrating to Israel, known as Aliyah.

3. Maamar Leshon HaKodesh (Treatise about the holy tongue), in which Teitelbaum writes that not only is there no reason to choose to speak Modern Hebrew – it is actually forbidden. This was written as a personal answer to the chief rabbi of Montreal at the time, Rabbi Pinchas Hirschsprung, and it was later added into this book.

=== Other arguments ===
1. Rabbi Teitelbaum refers to Religious Zionism as a "major desecration of God's name".
2. Blames Zionism for worsening, and the aveirah of Zionism for being a cause of, the Holocaust, both in direct ways, as well as on a spiritual level, by causing the fulfillment of the slaughter the Talmud says will happen if the oaths are violated.
3. Refers to Zionist leaders such as Theodor Herzl as "heretics".
4. Argues that participation in the Israeli elections violates Halacha and is a grave sin.
5. Blames the bloodshed in the Middle East on the Zionists.
6. Rules that Yeshivahs should boycott Israeli government handouts to support their institutions.
7. Asserts that the way of the Baal Shem Tov is forgotten today, and that Hasidus is no longer properly understood.
8. Argues against the practice of making decisions on the basis of folk tales about Hasidic rabbis, especially in matters of Halacha.
9. Stresses that blind faith in the righteous is foolish, as even genuinely learned and pious scholars can be misled, make errors, or abandon their righteous ways; rather, a person must conduct his own examination of the original sources.

== See also ==
- Three Oaths
- HaTekufah HaGedolah
