= Dushinsky =

Dushinsky, Dushinski, and Duschinsky are transliteration variants of the Polish surname Duszyński.

Notable people with the surname include:

- Dushinsky (Hasidic dynasty)

== People ==
- Michael Pinto-Duschinsky (born 1943), British political consultant and writer
- Simon Dushinsky (born 1972), American real estate developer
- Ted Dushinski (1943 – 2005), Canadian football player
- Wilhelm Duschinsky (1860–1924), Austrian philologist
- Yisroel Moshe Dushinsky (1921–2003), second Rebbe of the Dushinsky Hasidic dynasty
- Yosef Tzvi Dushinsky (first Dushinsky rebbe) (1867–1948), first Rebbe of Dushinsky Hasidic dynasty
- Yosef Tzvi Dushinsky (third Dushinsky rebbe), third Rebbe of the Dushinsky Hasidic dynasty
