= Yosef Tzvi Dushinsky =

Yosef Tzvi Dushinsky may refer to:

- Rabbi Yosef Tzvi Dushinsky (first Dushinsky rebbe) (1865–1948)
- Rabbi Yosef Tzvi Dushinsky (third Dushinsky rebbe), current Rebbe of the Dushinsky Hasidic dynasty
