= Duszyński =

Duszyński (feminine: Duszyńska; plural: Duszyńscy) is a Polish surname. The Russian-language spelling is Dushinsky/ Dushinski

Notable people with this surname include:

- Jerzy Duszyński (disambiguation), multiple individuals
- Kajetan Duszyński (born 1995), Polish sprinter
