= Avrohom Yitzchok Ulman =

Hasidic rabbi in Jerusalem (born 1947)

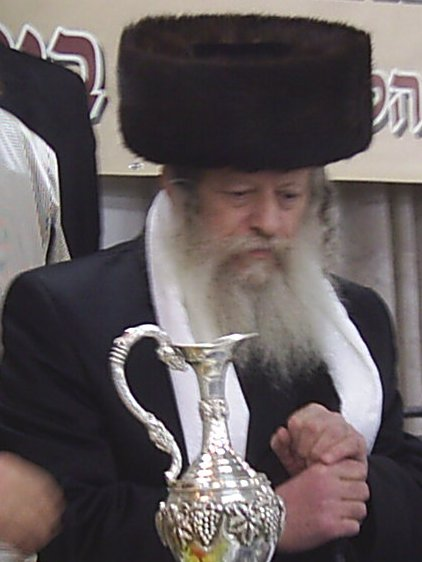
Rabbi Avrohom Yitzchok Ulman

Rabbi Avrohom Yitzchok Ulman (also Ullman; Hebrew: אברהם יצחק אולמן, Yiddish: אברהם יצחק אולמאן; born 1947) is a senior Haredi rabbi and Rabbinic Judge living in Jerusalem.

== Biography ==
He was born in Hungary and immigrated to Israel as a child. He serves on the Beis Din (court of Jewish law), also known as the Badatz, of the Edah HaChareidis, Jerusalem's umbrella Haredi community. He also presides over his own Beis Din, which deals mainly with financial matters. He is known as an expert in Choshen Mishpat (Jewish Monetary law). He is a respected Haredi leader, often officiating at public gatherings of Haredi Jews in Jerusalem.

Rabbi Ulman is a member of the Dushinsky Hasidic sect. He was the closest disciple of the previous rebbe of Dushinsky, Rabbi Yisroel Moshe Dushinsky, and was present when the latter died, leading the massive prayer and funeral services that followed. In festive gatherings in Dushinsky, he usually sits next to the Rebbe.

He has endorsed and signed numerous declarations and works against Zionism in general and against the practices of the state of Israel.

He lives in the Jerusalem neighborhood of Givat Shaul, where he is the rabbi of the largest synagogue of the neighborhood, called Ner Yisroel, more commonly known as "Zupnik", and of the section of the neighborhood surrounding it. Rabbi Ulman became leader of the community upon its foundation, about 30 years ago.

Ulman was one of the main speakers at a major protest rally against the growing influence of nationalistic (Zionist) thought and philosophies in the Haredi world, held on Sunday, 24 February 2008 in Yeshivas Meah Shearim.
