= Shmuel Hanavi =

Shmuel Hanavi (Hebrew: שמואל הנביא Samuel the Prophet) may refer to:

- Samuel (bible), the Prophet
- Shmuel HaNavi (neighborhood), a neighborhood in Jerusalem, Israel
- Shmuel HaNavi Street, a major thoroughfare bordering the neighborhood
