= Shaare Zedek Cemetery, Jerusalem =

Jewish cemetery in Jerusalem

Shaare Zedek Cemetery
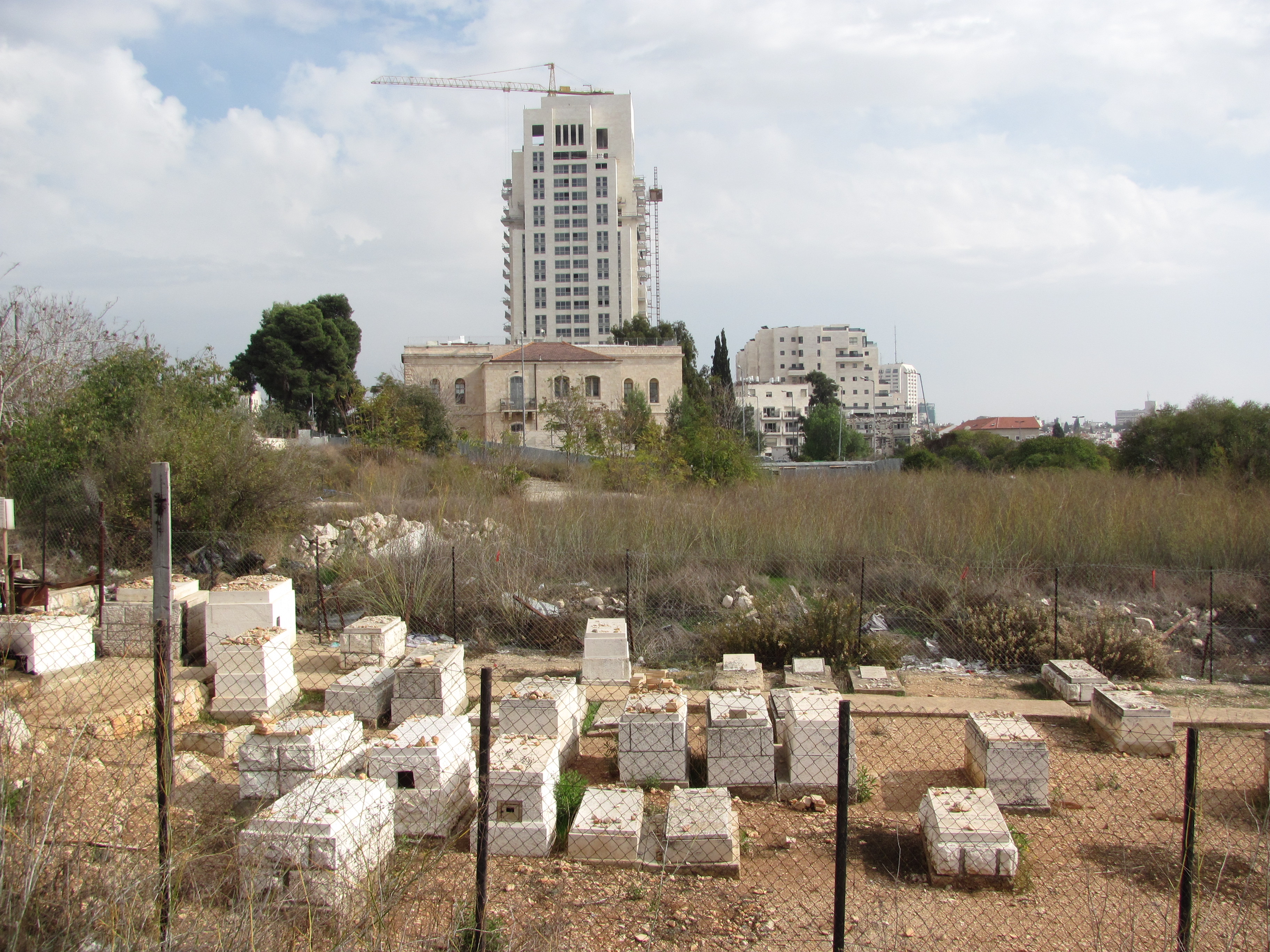
- Interactive map of Shaare Zedek Cemetery

Details
- Established: 19 July 1948
- Location: Jerusalem
- Coordinates: 31.7872°N 35.2068°E
- Type: Jewish

The Shaare Zedek Cemetery is a small Jewish burial ground located behind the first Shaare Zedek Hospital in Jerusalem. Originally used by the hospital as farmland for grazing milk cows, the area was converted into a temporary cemetery during the Arab siege of Jerusalem in 1948. Approximately 200 burials were conducted here between March and October of that year. Most graves were transferred to permanent cemeteries after the war, but a handful remain, notably those of several prominent Jerusalem rabbis and the founding director of Shaare Zedek Hospital, Dr. Moshe Wallach.

== Location ==
The cemetery is located on the north side of Shazar Boulevard, between Nordau and Agrippas Streets.

== History ==
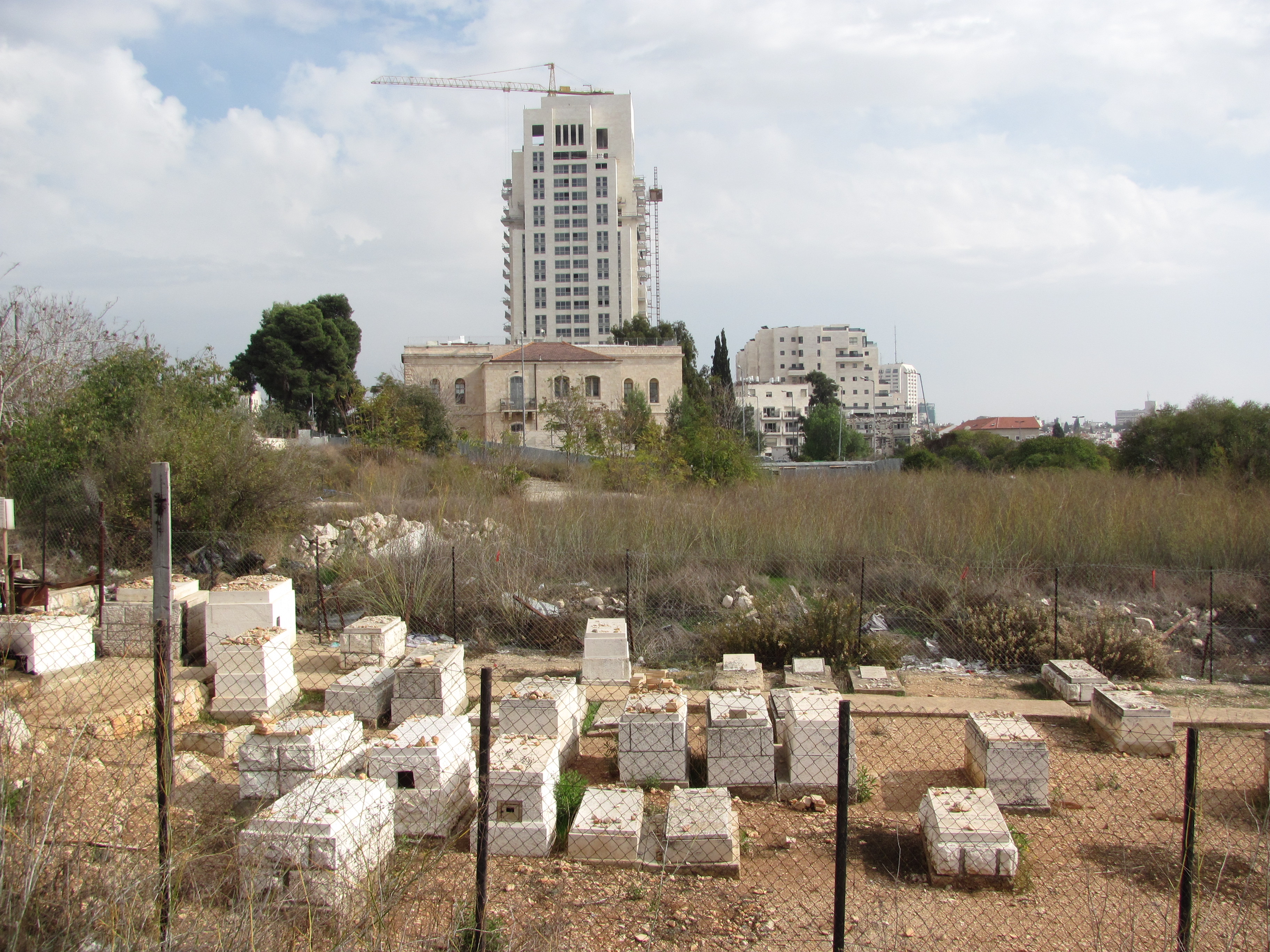
The cemetery in relation to the old Shaare Zedek Hospital building (middle background), today headquarters of the Israel Broadcasting Authority.

Until 1948, Jewish burials in Jerusalem were conducted in the centuries-old Jewish cemetery on the Mount of Olives. In January 1948, the Arab siege of Jerusalem made the Mount of Olives inaccessible, as the route to the cemetery passed through hostile Arab villages. A new burial ground was opened next to the Sanhedria neighborhood on the northern border on March 28, 1948. Since the Sanhedria Cemetery was operated under the exclusive jurisdiction of the Kehilat Yerushalayim chevra kadisha (burial society), founded in 1939 by Zionist leaders and moderate rabbis of the Old Yishuv, many Haredi residents of the Old Yishuv refused to use it, prompting the need for another burial ground in Jerusalem.

In March 1948, the chevra kadisha of the Perushim and Ashkenazim asked Shaare Zedek Hospital director Dr. Wallach, an activist in the Agudath Israel Orthodox Jewish movement, for permission to erect a temporary burial ground on land beside his hospital. This land had formerly been used to graze milk cows to provide fresh milk to hospitalized children. From March through October 1948, approximately 200 burials took place here. Some time after the war ended, most of the graves were transferred to permanent cemeteries.

== Notable graves ==
A handful of graves still remain on the site. The most notable are:

- Yosef Tzvi Dushinsky (1867–1948), first Dushinsky Rebbe and Gaavad Av Beis Din of the Edah HaChareidis of Jerusalem, who died in the Shaare Zedek Hospital in October 1948
- Yisroel Moshe Dushinsky (1921–2003), son of Rabbi Yosef Tzvi Dushinsky; second Dushinsky Rebbe and Gaavad Av Beis Din of the Edah HaChareidis. He was forced to pay a huge sum of money in order to be buried next to his father, as the cemetery had long been closed to burials.
- Yechiel Michel Schlesinger (1898–1948), co-founder and rosh yeshiva of Yeshivas Kol Torah
- Avraham Schlesinger (1937–2010), son of Rabbi Yechiel Michel Schlesinger; rosh kollel of the Kotzk kollel in Bnei Brak. His request to be buried next to his father was opposed by the burial society, but went ahead with the intercession of Deputy Health Minister Yaakov Litzman.
- Dr. Moshe Wallach (1866–1957), who was close to the first Dushinsky Rebbe and asked to be buried beside him.
- Menachem Mendel Halevi Volpo (died 1948)

== Gallery ==
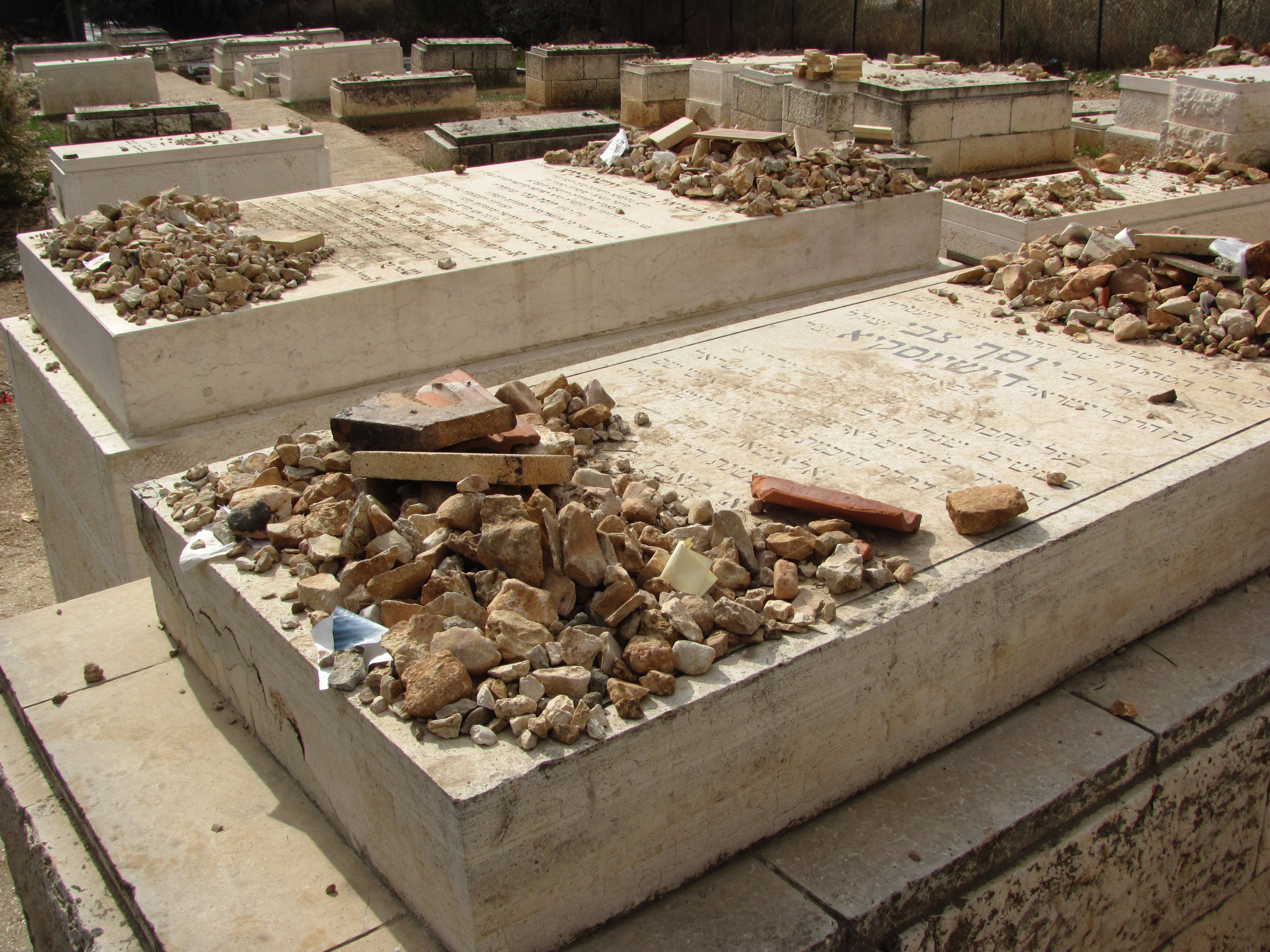
Graves of the first Dushinsky Rebbe, Rabbi Yosef Tzvi Dushinsky (foreground) and his son, Rabbi Yisroel Moshe Dushinsky, second Dushinsky Rebbe (background)

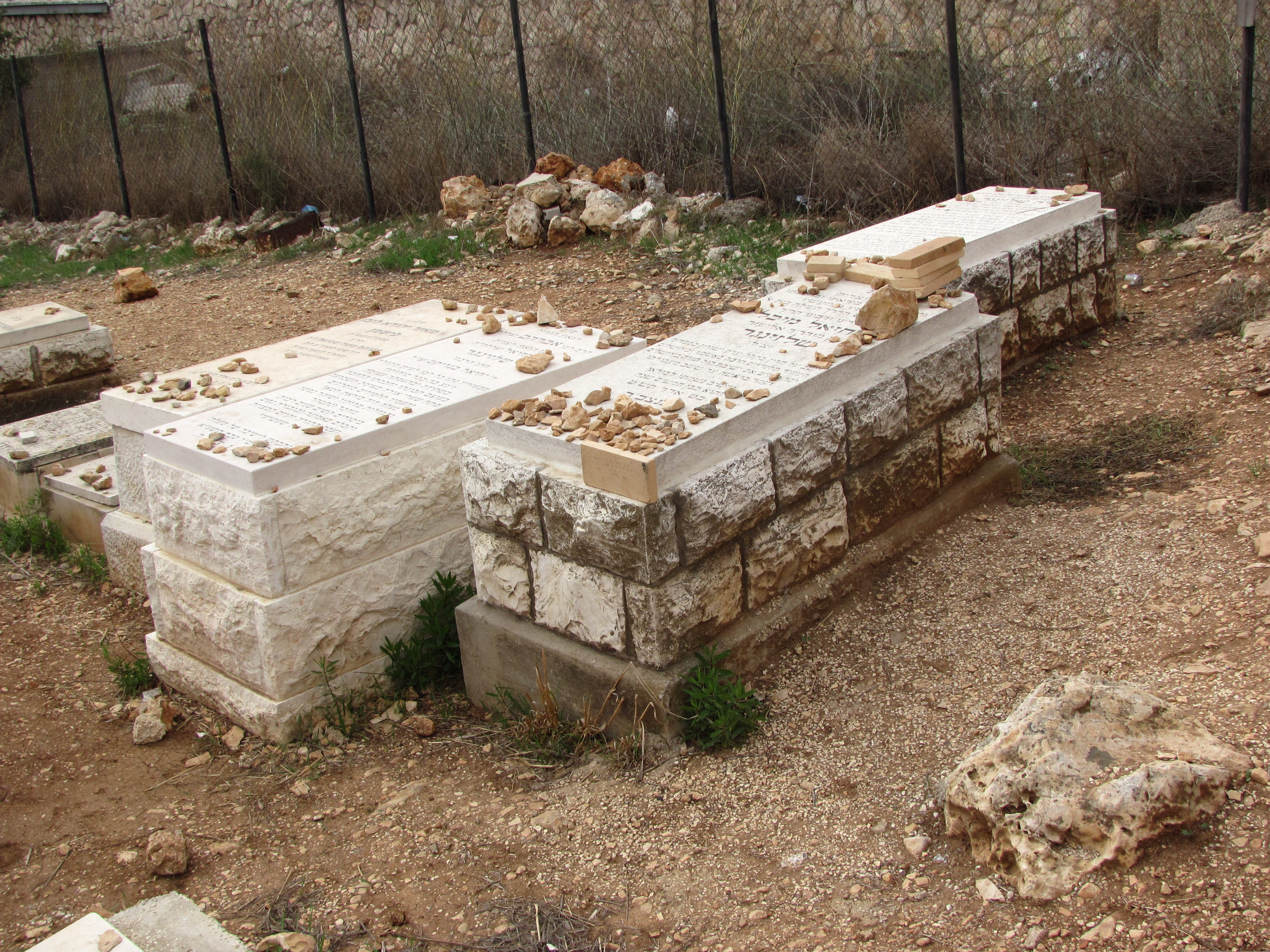
Graves of Rabbi Yechiel Michel Schlesinger (right) and his son, Rabbi Avraham Schlesinger (middle)

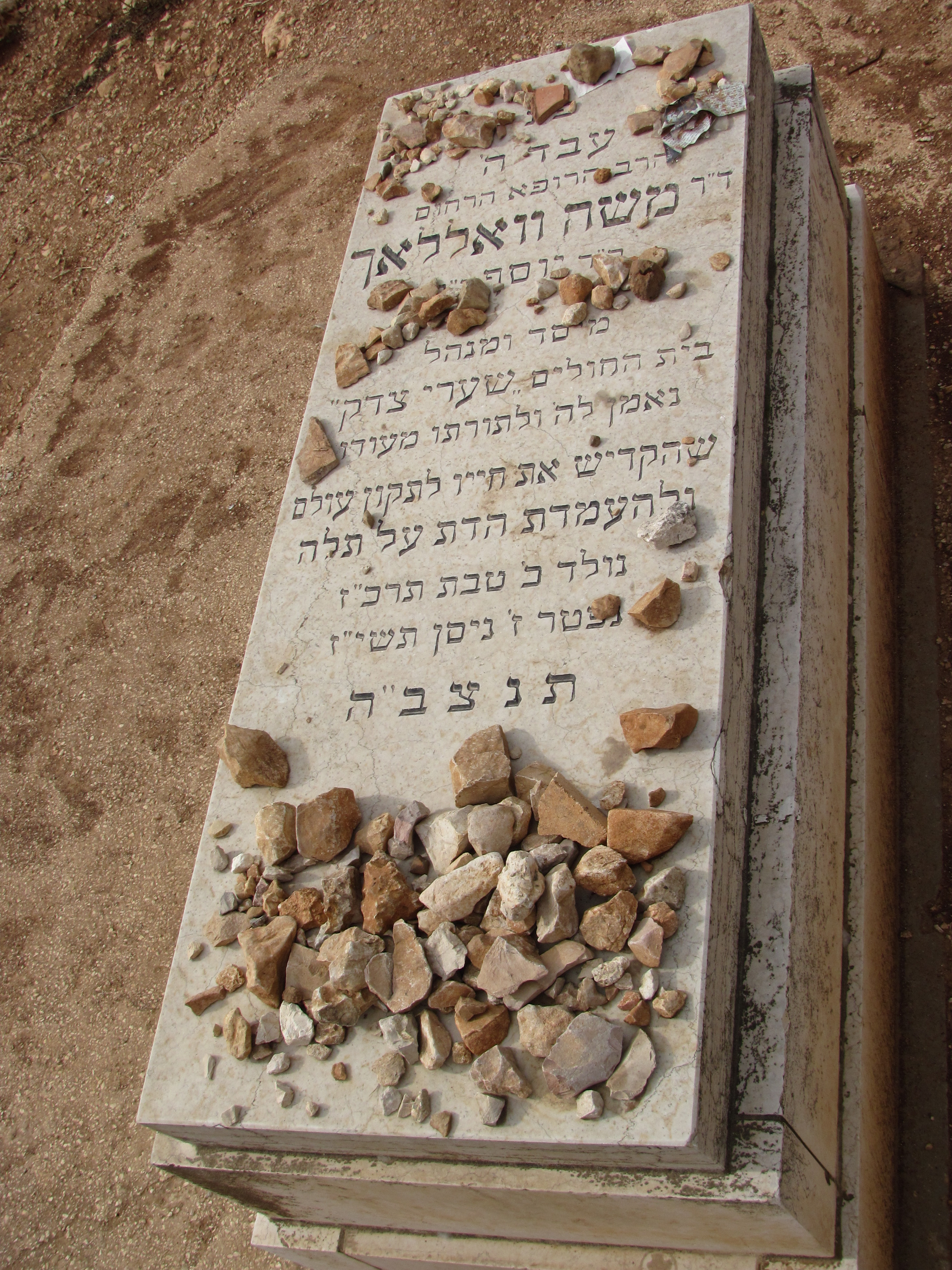
Grave of Dr. Moshe Wallach
