= Zelig Reuven Bengis =

Russian Jewish rabbi (1864–1953)

Zelig Reuven Bengis זליג ראובן בנגיס
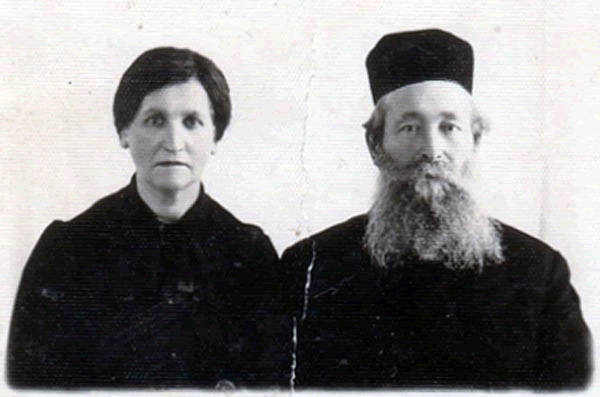
- Zelig Reuven Bengis and his wife

Personal life
- Born: 1864 Shnipishok, Russia
- Died: May 21, 1953 (aged 88–89) Jerusalem

Religious life
- Religion: Judaism

Zelig Reuven Bengis (Hebrew: זליג ראובן בנגיס; 1864 – 21 May 1953) was the Chief Rabbi of Jerusalem for the Edah HaChareidis and their Grand Patriarch. He wrote a seven-volume commentary on the Talmud, called "Leflagos Reuven".

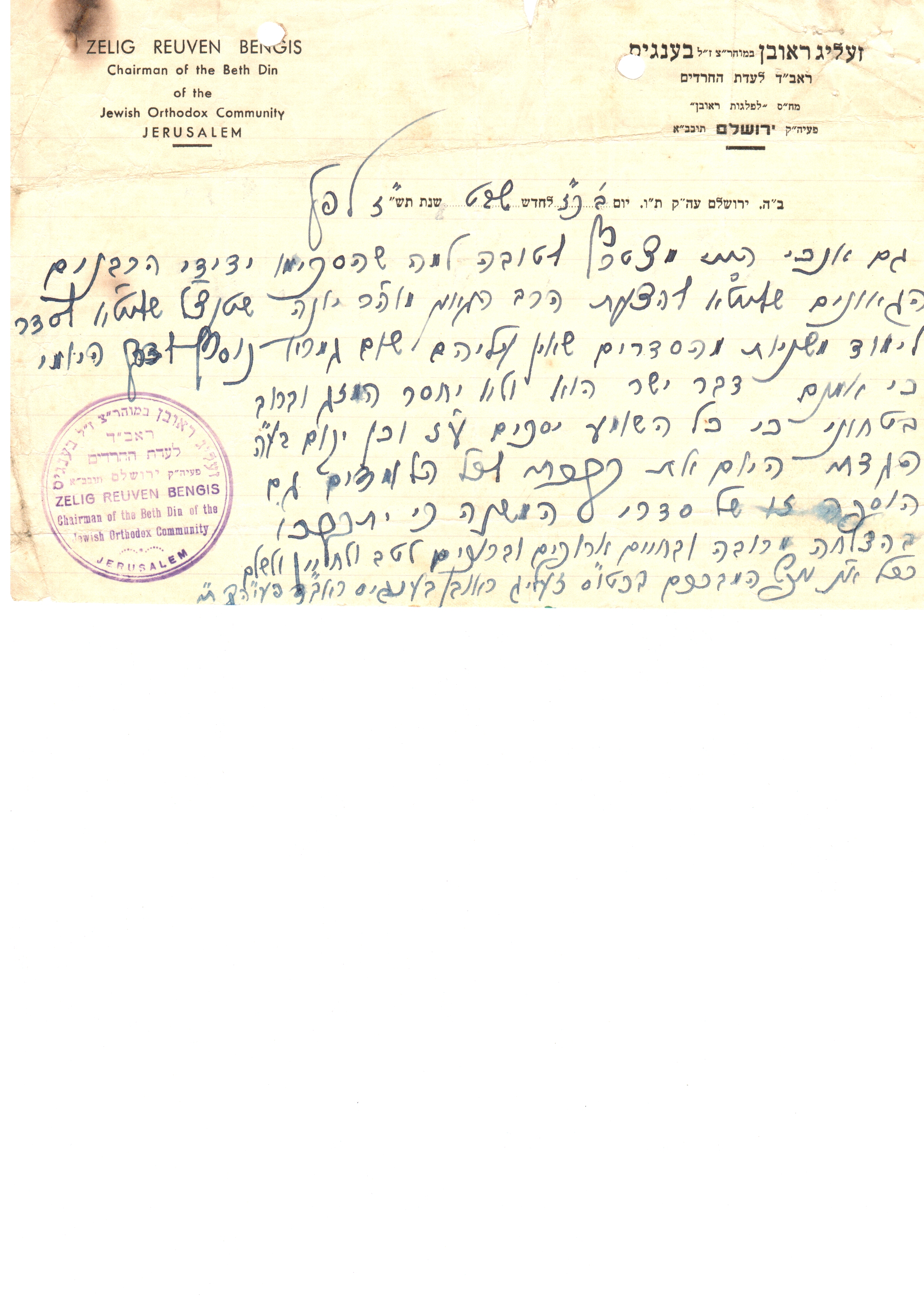
הרב בנגיס בחתימה ללמוד משנה יומית בכתב ידו

== Youth ==
He was the son of Rabbi Zvi Hirsch Bengis, the Rabbi of the Russian Empire (now Lithuanian) town of Šnipiškės (now a neighborhood of Vilna), and his wife Shayna, the granddaughter of Rabbi Aaron Brody, dayan of Vilna. Rabbi Zelig Reuven was soon known as "the Shnipishoker illui" (prodigy). When he was 17 years old, he went to learn in the Volozhin yeshiva under the Netziv, who called him "the living Shas". While learning at Valozhyn, his reputation quickly grew, and he was known as an extremely sharp student and a diligent learner.

After having learned in Volozhin for several years, he married the daughter of Rabbi Chaim Tzvi Broide, Rav of the towns Nemakščiai (Nemoksht in Yiddish), Švėkšna (Shvkshna in Yiddish), and Žagarė (Zhager in Yiddish). After his marriage, he spent eight years living with his in-laws, learning all day. In 1892, he was appointed Rabbi of Boćki (Bodki), Poland, succeeding Rabbi Malkiel Tzvi Tenenbaum, who took the position of Rabbi of Lomza. While he was the Rabbi of Boćki, in the year 1906, he began to publish his Leflagos Reuvain volumes. These publications took a unique form, and were far from the standard type of commentary on the Talmud. Rather they were primarily a series of pilpulistic connections between the beginning and end of each tractate and the beginning and end of each of the orders in which the tractates are found. The body of the books were brilliant and unique novellae and expositions of the positions of the Rishonim and their views. The particular genre in which Rabbi Bengis chose to couch his novellae was one that very few Talmudic students could explore, much less master, and that essentially caused his entire literary oeuvre to fall into obscurity. In later years, his grandson-in-law Rabbi Shmuel Vitsick (married to Chaya Perel Bengis) in dedication exerted much effort, travel, time and money engaging seforim experts and printers including Mossad haRav Cook to reorganize and publish three volumes of his thoughts, so as to make the contents more understandable to the general public.

Rabbi Shmuel and Chaya Perel Vitsick had four daughters, respectively married to Aharon Golvensitz, Tzvi Hersch Taragin, Tzvi Gray and Hershel Schabes. A number of children and grandchildren carry the name Zelig Reuven and Zelig Reuven Golvensitz currently heads the Kollel R' Bengis in Bayit Vegan Jerusalem.

After having spent 19 years as the rabbi of Boćki (Bodki), in 1911 he became the rabbi of Kalvarija, Lithuania.

== Rav in the Holy Land ==
In 1932, after the death of Rabbi Yosef Chaim Sonnenfeld, Bengis was asked to become rosh av beit din (Ravad) - Head of Court - of the Edah HaChareidis in Jerusalem. At that point, however, he declined the offer, since his rival there would be Rabbi Avraham Yitzchak Kook - a fellow student of the Netziv of Volozhin.

However, the leadership of the Edah repeated their offer in 1937. Since Rav Kook had died, Rabbi Bengis accepted the offer, and moved from Lithuania to Palestine - shortly before World War II broke out.

In 1947, he and Rabbi Yosef Tzvi Dushinsky, the Chief Rabbi - Gaavad - of the Edah, appeared before a United Nations commission which was to decide the future of the British Mandate of Palestine. They spoke against the establishment of a Jewish state there, requesting the UN to recognize Jerusalem as a holy city which should not be part of any state, but should be ruled by the UN itself as an international city. He also requested the commission to allow the immigration of homeless Jews who had survived the war in Europe.

When Rabbi Dushinsky died in 1948, Bengis succeeded him as gaivad of the Edah. Simultaneously, he also fulfilled the position of Rosh Yeshiva at Yeshivas Ohel Moshe, also in Jerusalem.

Bengis died on the 7th of Sivan, 5713 (21 May 1953). He was almost 90 years old, and had fulfilled rabbinical roles in Lithuania and Jerusalem for over 60 years. He was interred on Har HaMenuchot.
