= 1997–1999 Jerusalem stabbings =

Terrorist incident in Jerusalem

1997–99 Jerusalem stabbings
- Part of the Israeli–Palestinian conflict
- Location: Jerusalem
- Date: 30 November 1997 – 13 January 1999
- Attack type: Mass stabbing
- Deaths: 2–3
- Injuries: 7-8

The 1997–99 Jerusalem stabbings were a series of murders and attempted murders in Jerusalem which primarily took place in and around the neighborhood of Mea She'arim.

The grandson of one of the victims, Khairi Alqam, who was named after his grandfather, was responsible for the 2023 East Jerusalem synagogue shooting.

== Description ==
The first stabbing occurred in November 1997. The stabbings all took place under similar circumstances; all were either at work or on the way to their workplace. Two of the victims died as a result of the stabbing, while the others were injured to varying degrees of severity.

Jerusalem police concluded that it was a series of "systematic stabbings" by an ultra-orthodox Jew with nationalistic and anti-Palestinian motives.

The following 10 attacks were all believed to be connected to the "serial stabber" by the Jerusalem police:

- 30 Nov 1997: A Palestinian was stabbed and lightly wounded at the corner of Shmuel HaNavi Street and Shimon Hatzadik.
- 17 Feb 1998: Hamzeh Obeidieh, a 14-year-old Palestinian boy from Shuafat, a worker in a local grocery store, was stabbed and lightly wounded on Mea Shearim's Batei Warsaw Street.
- 10 March 1998: Nasser Bsharat, a 17-year-old Palestinian boy from Jaba', also a grocery store employee, was stabbed and moderately wounded on Reishit Khokhma Street.
- 12 March 1998: Hassan Ka'abneh, a 35-year-old Palestinian man, was stabbed and moderately to severely wounded in Mea Shearim.
- 29 April 1998: Wael Sawahri, a Jordanian-Palestinian visiting his family in East Jerusalem, was stabbed and lightly wounded. Sawahri had just left Bikur Cholim Hospital and was stabbed from behind while walking on Mea She'arim Street.
- 7 May 1998: Nashed Salah, a 38-year-old Palestinian baker, was stabbed at 5 am while walking to work at a bread distributor on Beit Yisrael Street. The knife found by the police bore the name of a Jew who had been killed in the wider conflict. Salah was able to give the police a description of his attacker. Some sources say that Salah died from his wounds, others do not.
- 14 May 1998: Khairi Alqam, a 51 year old Palestinian construction worker from East Jerusalem, was stabbed and killed on Shmuel HaNavi Street. The assailant, armed with a large knife, attacked Alqam from behind early in the morning, as he was on his way to his place of work, a construction site in the Israeli settlement of Ramot, after praying at Al-Aqsa Mosque. The attacker stabbed Alqam repeatedly in the torso. Alqam, collapsed and died on the sidewalk. 25 years later, the grandson of Alqam, who was named after his grandfather, was responsible for the 2023 East Jerusalem synagogue shooting.
- 2 Dec 1998: Osama Natsheh, a 41-year-old Palestinian city street cleaner from Abu Tor was stabbed and killed on Shmuel HaNavi Street. He had left for work at around 5am, and was stabbed shortly after about 30 yards from his home, collapsing on the sidewalk in a pool of blood.
- 13 Jan 1999: A Palestinian from Ras al-Amud was stabbed.

== Investigation ==
Most survivors of the attacks said they never did not see the face of their attacker, some said it was covered, but he was consistently identified as looking like an Orthodox Jew.

The residents of the Haredi neighborhoods in which the attacks took place refused to cooperate with the police investigation.

The police investigation team discovered certain details were the same in all the cases, strengthening their assumption that the same man was behind it all, with nationalistic/anti-Palestinian motives.

== Compensation requests ==
The family of Khairi Alqam, a 51-year-old construction worked killed by the perpetrator, requested compensation from the National Insurance Institute according to the "Victims of Hostile Acts Law", but was denied on the basis that this law only applies to attacks against Jews. After an extended appeal process, $162,000 compensation was awarded by a Defense Ministry committee, set up after the 1998 burning of the apartment of three Palestinian women in Jerusalem, alleged to have been carried out by Jewish extremists. However, a Jewish-led organization named Victims of Arab Terror International worked to prevent the payment from ever being made.
