= Jerzy Duszyński =

Jerzy Duszyński may refer to:

- Jerzy Duszyński (actor) (1917–1978), Polish actor
- Jerzy Duszyński (biochemist) (born 1950), Polish biochemist and professor of biological sciences
