= Wilhelm Duschinsky =

Austrian philologist, educator, and writer

- Born: 6 May 1860; Strasnitz, Moravia, Austrian Empire
- Died: 28 August 1924 (aged 64); Klagenfurt, Carinthia, Austria
- Spouse: Bertha Löwinger

Wilhelm Duschinsky (6 May 1860 – 28 August 1924) was an Austrian philologist, educator, and writer.

== Biography ==
Duschinsky was born in Strasnitz, Moravia, on 6 May 1860. He attended the gymnasium in Vienna, and afterward studied Romanic and Germanic philology at the Universities of Vienna and Paris. In 1892 he became professor at the Oberrealschule in the seventh district of Vienna.

Besides numerous monographs, he published a number of essays in the Archiv für neuere Sprachen und Literatur, the Zeitschrift für österreichische Gymnasien für das Realschulwesen, and the journal Österreichische Mittelschule.

== Publications ==
- "Zur Lautlehre des Französischen". Zwölfter Jahresbericht der K. K. Ober-Realschule in Bezirke Sechshaus bei Wien. Vienna: Rollinger & Moessmer. 1886.
- Die Technik von 'Hermann und Dorothea'. Braunschweig: George Westermann. 1887.
- "Das Stumme 'e' im Französischen". Prosa und Vers. 1889.
- Die Analytische Methode im Sprachunterrichte. 1889–1990.
- Die Lehre vom französischen Verb. Prague. 1890.
- Sur le 'Misanthrope' de Molière. 1893.
- Shakespearische Einflüsse auf Schiller's Tell. Vienna. 1898.
- Über die Quellen von Grillparzer's 'Esther'. 1898.
- Über die Quellen von Kleist's 'Prinz von Homburg'. 1900.
- Übungsbuch zur Französischen Syntax. 1901.
- "Zur Reform der Französischen Syntax". Festschrift zum 50. Jahres-bericht der Schottenfelder K.K. Staats-Realschule. Vienna: Karl Schneid. 1901.
- Gesch. des Neuphilologischen Vereines an der Wiener Universität. Vienna: Braumüller. 1902.
- Choix de Lectures Expliquées. 1902.
- Über die Tätigkeit und die Ziele des Wiener Neuphilologischen Vereines. Vienna: Hödler. 1907.
