= Dushinsky (Hasidic dynasty) =

Hungarian Hasidic dynasty

Dushinsky Hasidic Dynasty
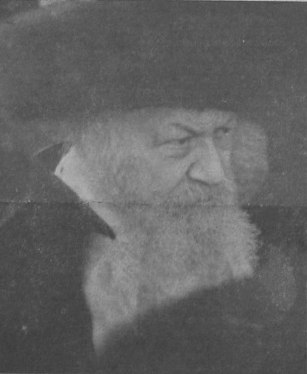
- Grand Rabbi Yosef Tzvi Dushinsky, (1865-1948)

Founder
- Rabbi Yosef Tzvi Dushinsky

Regions with significant populations
- Israel, United States, United Kingdom, Belgium

Religions
- Hasidic Judaism

Languages
- Yiddish, Hebrew

Related ethnic groups
- Satmar, Edah HaChareidis

Dushinsky (Duschinsky, Duschinszki, Duschinszky) is one of the few Hasidic dynasties not named after the place where it originated; instead, it is named after the rebbe's surname. It is relatively new, and became a dynasty in Jerusalem, where it is centered today. Unlike other Hasidic groups, it does not originate from a Hasidic background, but from the talmidim (students) of Moses Sofer.

== History ==
=== Yosef Tzvi Dushinsky (1865-1948), the Maharitz ===
The founder of the Dushinsky dynasty was Rabbi Yosef Tzvi Dushinsky, son of Rabbi Yisroel Dushinsky. He was a disciple of Rabbi Simcha Bunim Sofer (Shevet Sofer), one of the grandchildren of the Chasam Sofer.

After his marriage to the daughter of Rabbi Mordechai Winkler, author of Levushei Mordechai, Rabbi Dushinsky became the chief rabbi in Galanta, Slovakia. In an epidemic during the First World War, his first wife died childless, and he subsequently remarried Esther Neuhaus, daughter of Rabbi Yoel Tzvi Neuhaus. He relocated to the town of Chust, where he assumed the position of chief rabbi. In 1921, his only child, Yisroel Moshe, was born.

In 1932, Dushinsky and his son visited Mandatory Palestine. The chief rabbi and founder of the Edah HaChareidis, Rabbi Yosef Chaim Sonnenfeld, leader of the Haredi community of Jerusalem, died a few days later, and Dushinsky delivered one of the hespedim (eulogies) at the funeral. After his return to Chust, he was prevailed upon to succeed Sonnenfeld as Rav of Jerusalem. He and his family, together with 25 students, immigrated to Palestine on August 28, 1933. Dushinsky founded a community of Hungarian Jews in Jerusalem, affiliated with the Perushim section of the Edah HaChareidis.

Dushinsky was known for his strong opposition to Zionism, and spoke to the newly formed United Nations against the creation of the State of Israel. Rabbi Dushinsky died on the eve of Sukkos, 14th of Tishrei 1948, shortly after the founding of the State of Israel. He was succeeded by Rabbi Zelig Reuven Bengis.

Books written by him, or based on his work, include:

- Shut Maharitz (halachic responsa)
- Toras Maharitz (Chumash commentary)
- Chiddushei Maharitz (Gemara commentary)

=== Yisroel Moshe Dushinsky (1921-2003), the Maharim ===
Rabbi Yosef Tzvi's only son, Yisroel Moshe, inherited his father's position as Grand Rabbi of the Dushinsky community, and in turn also became the Chief Rabbi of the Edah HaChareidis. Under his leadership, the Dushinsky community was steered towards Hasidut. Rabbi Yisroel Moshe died in 2003; he was succeeded as Chief Rabbi of the Edah HaChareidis by Rabbi Yitzchok Tuvia Weiss and as Grand Rabbi of Dushinsky by his son, Rabbi Yosef Tzvi.

== Dushinsky today ==
Dushinsky's synagogue, which seats hundreds, is located behind the old building on Shmuel HaNavi Street. The main synagogue is only used on Shabbos and holidays; on weekdays, a complex of four smaller synagogues (shtiblach) in the basement of the building are used. The old synagogue, on the first floor of the old building, is now used for the tishen celebration.

Rebbe Yosef Tzvi Dushinsky appointed his younger brother, Mordechai Yehuda Dushinsky, as rabbi of the Dushinsky community in the all-Haredi Beit Shemesh neighbourhood of Ramat Beit Shemesh Bet. Aside from the Dushinsky communities in Jerusalem and Ramat Beit Shemesh, there are also smaller communities in Manchester, Elad, in New York's Boro Park district, and in London. In 2007, new Dushinsky synagogues were built in London and in the Williamsburg section of Brooklyn, New York, and building began for a new Talmud Torah in Ramat Beit Shemesh Bet, in addition to the newer synagogue there. There are also Dushinsky Hasidim in Antwerp; however, there is no specific Dushinsky synagogue there.

== Dushinsky customs ==
Dushinsky has several special minhagim (customs), in things such as the style of dress and the nusach (rite) used, called nusach Maharitz, a mix of Ashkenazi and Sephardi.

Regarding Zionism, the book Vayoel Moshe, written by Rabbi Joel Teitelbaum of Satmar, was recommended by both the previous rebbe and Avrohom Yitzchok Ulman when a new edition was printed in 2002.

== Lineage of the Dushinsky dynasty ==
Yosef Tzvi Dushinsky (1865-1948); The Maharitz
Yisroel Moshe Dushinsky (1921-2003) 'The Maharim
Yosef Tzvi Dushinsky; Dushinsky Rebbe of Jerusalem	Mordechai Yehudah Dushinsky; Rav of Dushinsky community in Ramat Beit Shemesh

== Sources ==
- Rossoff, Dovid (2005). קדושים אשר בארץ: קברי צדיקים בירושלים ובני ברק [The Holy Ones in the Earth: Graves of Tzaddikim in Jerusalem and Bnei Brak] (in Hebrew). Jerusalem: Machon Otzar HaTorah.
