= Yisroel Moshe Dushinsky =

2nd Rebbe of the Dushinsky Hasidic dynasty of Jerusalem, Israel

Grand Rabbi Yisroel Moshe Dushinsky ישראל משה דושינסקי
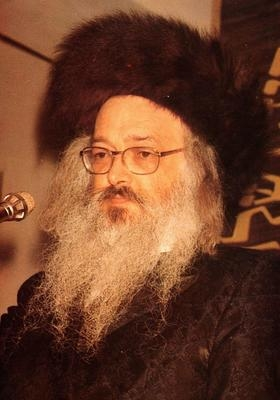
- Title: Second Dushinsky Rebbe

Personal life
- Born: Yisroel Moshe Dushinsky; December 22, 1921 Chust, Czechoslovakia
- Died: March 26, 2003 (aged 81) Jerusalem, Israel
- Buried: Shaare Zedek Cemetery, Jerusalem
- Children: Yosef Tzvi; Mordechai Yehuda; 3 daughters
- Parent(s): Yosef Tzvi Dushinsky; Esther Neuhaus
- Dynasty: Dushinsky
- Education: Yeshiva Beis Yosef Tzvi

Religious life
- Religion: Judaism

Jewish leader
- Predecessor: Grand Rabbi Yosef Tzvi Dushinsky
- Successor: Grand Rabbi Yosef Tzvi Dushinsky
- Began: 1948
- Ended: 2003
- Other: Chief Rabbi of the Edah HaChareidis
- Yahrtzeit: 22 Adar II 5763
- Residence: Jerusalem
- Dynasty: Dushinsky

Yisroel Moshe Dushinsky (Hebrew: ישראל משה דושינסקי; December 22, 1921 – March 26, 2003) also known as the Maharim, was the second Rebbe of the Dushinsky Hasidic dynasty of Jerusalem, Israel. He assumed the leadership of the Hasidut at the age of 28 upon the death of his father, Rabbi Yosef Tzvi Dushinsky, founder of the dynasty. He was also a member of the rabbinical court of the Edah HaChareidis for over 40 years, completing his tenure as the seventh chief rabbi and Grand Patriarch of Jerusalem for the Edah HaChareidis from 1996 to 2003.

== Early life ==
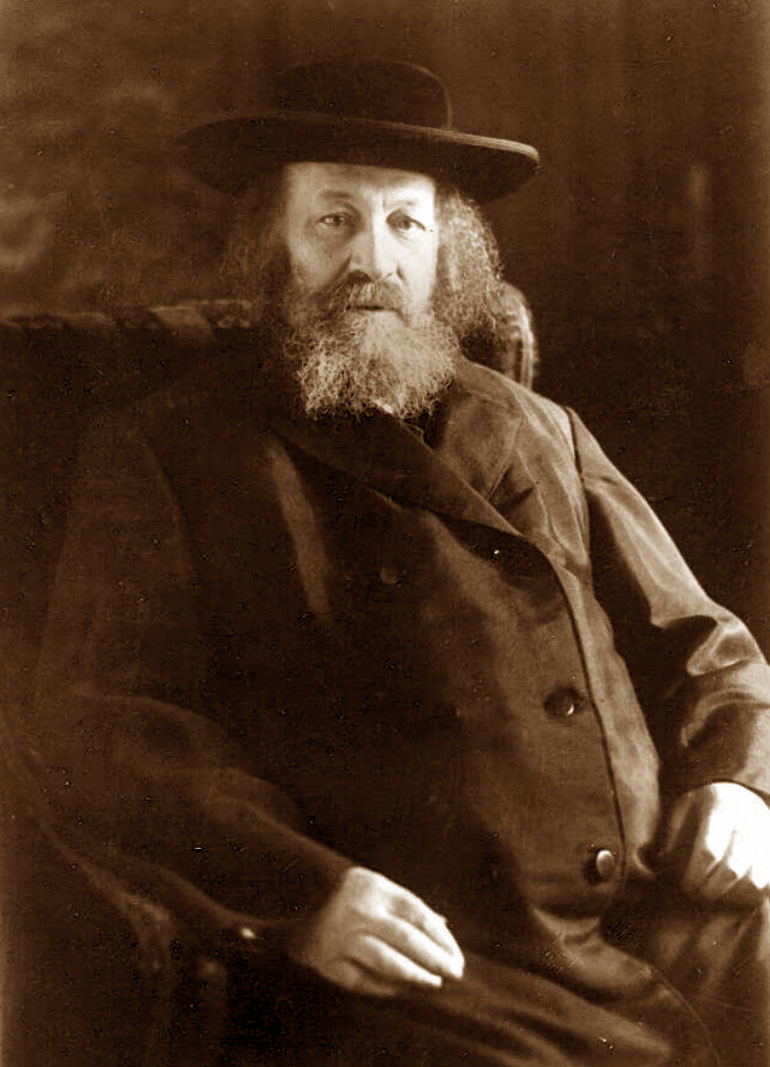
Rabbi Yosef Tzvi Dushinsky, founder of the Dushinsky Hasidic dynasty

Yisroel Moshe Dushinsky was the only child of Rabbi Yosef Tzvi Dushinsky and his second wife, Esther Neuhaus. His father was over 50 years old at the time of his birth. Yisrael Moshe was born in Chust, Ukraine, shortly after his father began serving as Rav of that city. He was named after his paternal grandfather, Yisroel, and his great uncle, Rabbi Moshe Schick (the Maharam Schick).

His father was very attached to him and brought him along when he visited Torah leaders of the era. During Adar 1932, the ten-year-old Yisroel Moshe accompanied his father on a visit to Mandatory Palestine, where they brought mishloach manot to the Jerusalem sage, Rabbi Yosef Chaim Sonnenfeld, who was on his deathbed. Sonnenfeld, who died a few days after this visit, blessed Yisroel Moshe with arichas yomim (long life).

The next year, Yisroel Moshe, his parents, and 25 of his father's students immigrated to Mandatory Palestine, arriving in the port of Jaffa on the ship Italia on August 28, 1933. Yisroel Moshe attended Talmud Torah Shomrei Hachomos. After his bar mitzvah, he began studying at his father's yeshiva, Yeshiva Beis Yosef Tzvi, which the latter had established on Shmuel HaNavi Street in Jerusalem. He later studied for rabbinical ordination under Rabbi Hanoch Padwa and Rabbi Eliezer Brand.

He married the daughter of Rabbi Dovid Yehoshua Gross. The couple had two sons, Yosef Tzvi and Mordechai Yehuda, and three daughters.

== Rosh yeshiva and rabbinical leader ==
After his marriage, his father asked him to begin delivering shiurim (Torah lectures) in the yeshiva. He was 28 years old when his father died in 1948. He took over the administration of the yeshiva and built it into a large Torah institution enrolling thousands of students. Every day after the conclusion of the morning prayers, still wearing tallit and tefillin, he would deliver a shiur on the Shulchan Arukh and its commentaries.

Following his father's death, he was also appointed to the Edah HaChareidis rabbinical court. In 1967 he became a regular member of the court, a position he held for over 40 years. In 1989 he was appointed Ravad (Rav Av Beit Din), and in 1996, Gaavad (Gaon Av Beit Din, or Chief Rabbi) of the Edah HaChareidis. He was the seventh chief rabbi in that organization's history. On a day that the court adjudicated a get (divorce) or chalitza (ceremony allowing a childless widow to remarry), he would fast.

He was widely respected for his Torah knowledge, refined character, and caring personality.

== Death and legacy ==
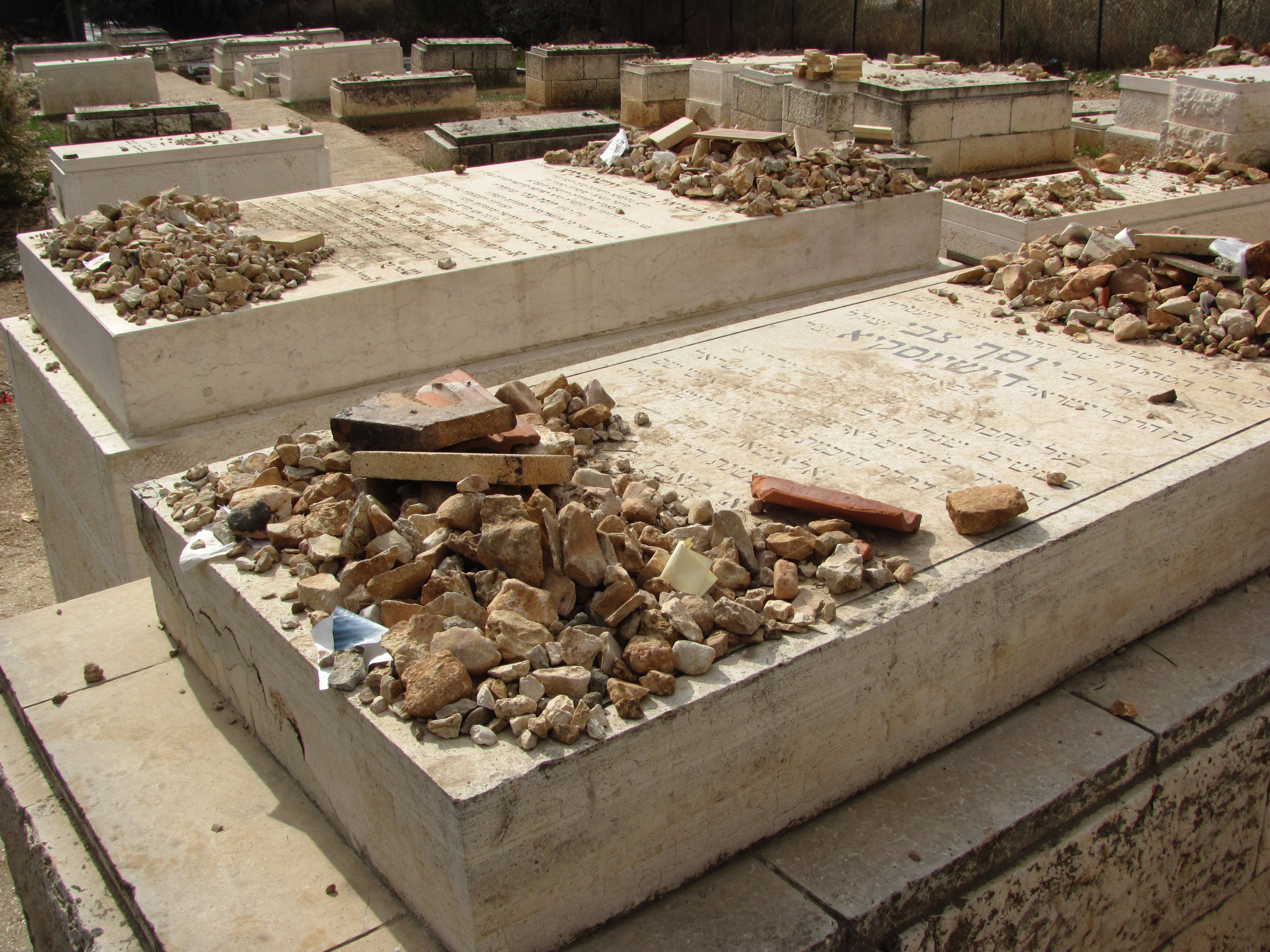
Graves of Dushinsky (background) and his father (foreground) in the Shaare Zedek Cemetery (visitors put pebbles on Jewish graves to show the dead are not forgotten)

Dushinsky had ill health during his final years and underwent several surgeries. In February 2003 his health declined further and he was hospitalized. He was unable to attend the wedding of his grandson, son of Rabbi Mordechai Yehuda, on March 25; he died the next morning at 3:15 am in the presence of family and close students.

He was buried next to his father in the Shaare Zedek Cemetery in Jerusalem. This cemetery had been opened as a temporary burial ground during the 1948 Arab-Israeli war and most of the graves had been moved to other, permanent cemeteries in the early 1950s. The grave of his father, who had died in 1948, had not been moved. Since the cemetery had long been closed to burials, Dushinsky paid a large amount to be buried next to his father.

At the funeral, it was announced that his son, Yosef Tzvi, would succeed him as Grand Rabbi and head of the Dushinsky yeshiva. Rabbi Yitzchok Tuvia Weiss succeeded him as chief rabbi of the Edah HaChareidis.

His Torah writings were published under the title Toras Maharim.

== Rebbes of Dushinsky ==
1. Rabbi Yosef Tzvi Dushinsky (1867–1948)
2. Rabbi Yisroel Moshe Dushinsky (1921–2003), son of Yosef Tzvi Dushinsky
3. Rabbi Yosef Tzvi Dushinsky, son of Yisroel Moshe Dushinsky

== Sources ==
- Heilman, Samuel C. (1992). Defenders of the Faith: Inside Ultra-Orthodox Jewry. University of California Press. ISBN 0520221125.
- Rossoff, Dovid (2005). קדושים אשר בארץ: קברי צדיקים בירושלים ובני ברק [The Holy Ones in the Earth: Graves of Tzaddikim in Jerusalem and Bnei Brak] (in Hebrew). Jerusalem: Machon Otzar HaTorah.
