= Shmuel HaNavi Street =

Street in Jerusalem

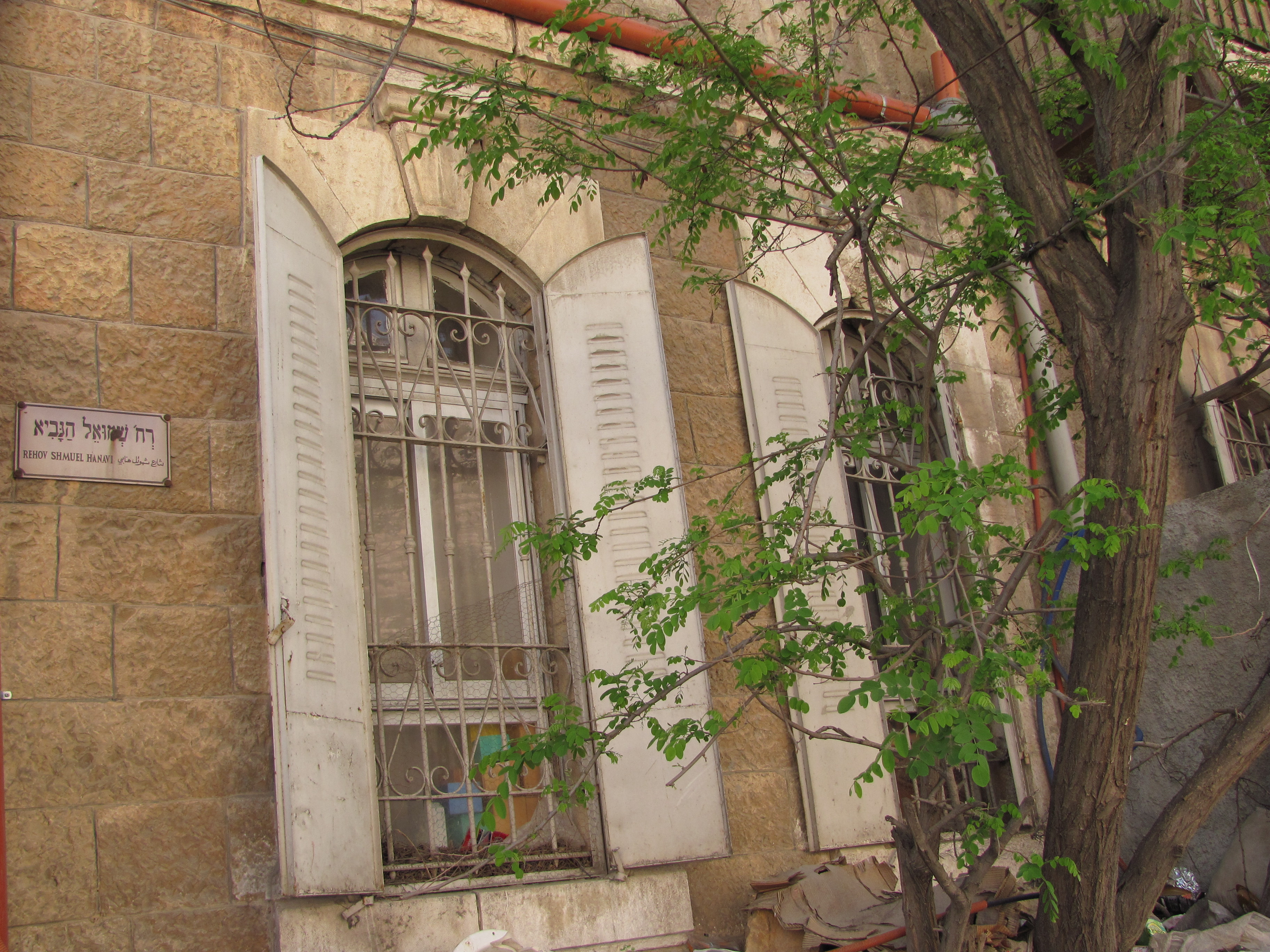
Old-style shutters on a Shmuel HaNavi Street house.

Shmuel HaNavi Street (Hebrew: רחוב שמואל הנביא, lit. Samuel the Prophet Street) is a main road in north-central Jerusalem. It starts at the intersection of St. George and Shivtei Israel Streets near Highway 60, and merges into Golda Meir Boulevard (Route 436) just past the intersection of Bar-Ilan and Hativat Harel Streets. The continuation of the street winds up to the tomb of Samuel the prophet, after whom the street is named.

Shmuel HaNavi Street borders the Beit Yisrael, Bukharim, Arzei HaBira, Shmuel HaNavi, Sanhedria and Gush 80 neighborhoods. With a largely Haredi population, the street houses major synagogues for two Hasidic dynasties and many Haredi schools, yeshivas, and girls' seminaries.

== Name ==
The street is named after Samuel the prophet (11th century BC), the last Biblical judge, who anointed both Saul (I Samuel 15:1) and David (I Samuel 16:12–13) as kings of Israel. The Tomb of Samuel, which rests atop the tallest mountain outside the Jerusalem city limits, can be reached by following the continuation of Shmuel HaNavi Street northward.

== History ==
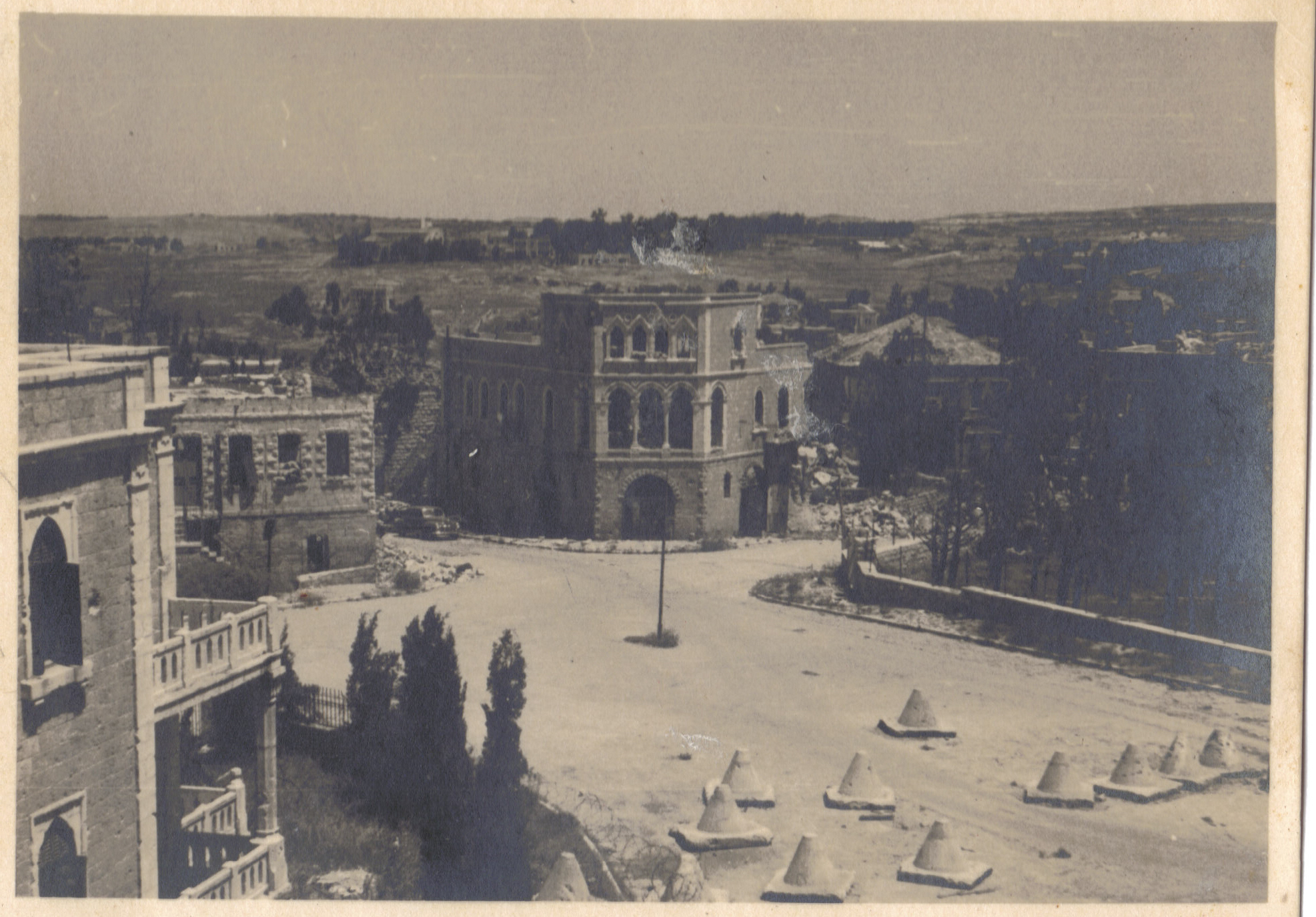
Area separating Jewish Jerusalem from Arab Jerusalem before the erection of the Mandelbaum Gate, May 1949.

Before 1948, Shmuel HaNavi Street lay at the northern edge of Jewish Jerusalem, with the Arab neighborhood of Sheikh Jarrah to the northeast. Its location beyond populated areas such as Mea Shearim and Beit Yisrael was the reason why Simcha Mandelbaum, a Jewish merchant who had raised his family in the Old City, decided to build a new home at the eastern end of the street in 1927. While Mandelbaum wished to set an example for other Jews to build in the area and expand the borders of Jerusalem, the Waqf, which owned large tracts all around, forbade Arabs from selling any more land to Jews, so the three-story house stood on its own. During the riots of 1929 and 1936, the Haganah took up positions in the Mandelbaum House to drive back the rioting Arabs leaving Damascus Gate toward Mea Shearim and Beit Yisrael. Arab Legionnaires blew up the house during the 1948 Arab-Israeli War.

During the 1947 civil war, residents on Shmuel HaNavi Street were subject to frequent shooting from snipers in Sheikh Jarrah. When war broke out in 1948, the street was thrust onto the frontlines, becoming a strategic gateway for Arab Legionnaires seeking to enter Jewish Jerusalem.

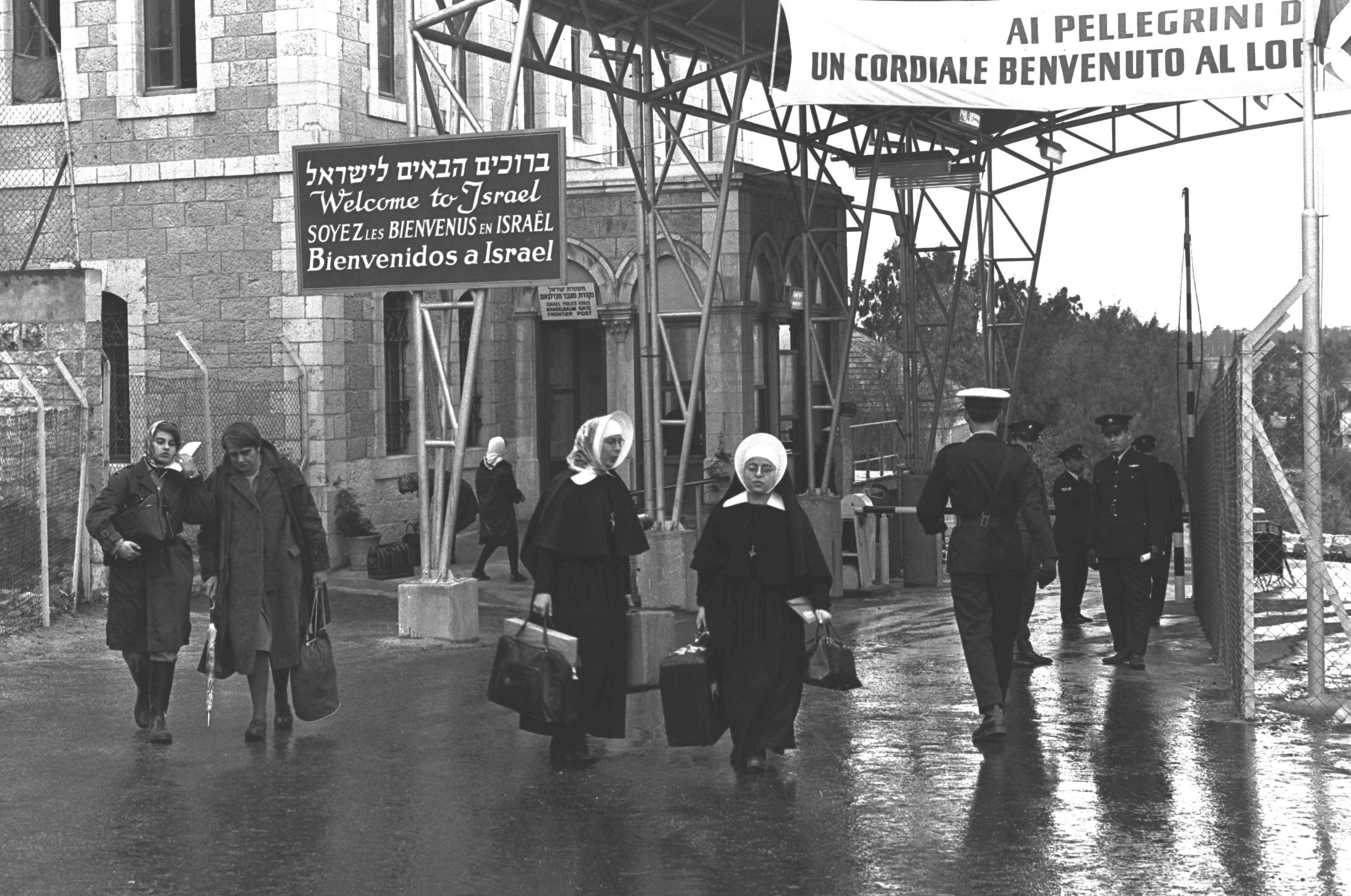
The Mandelbaum Gate in operation, 1955.

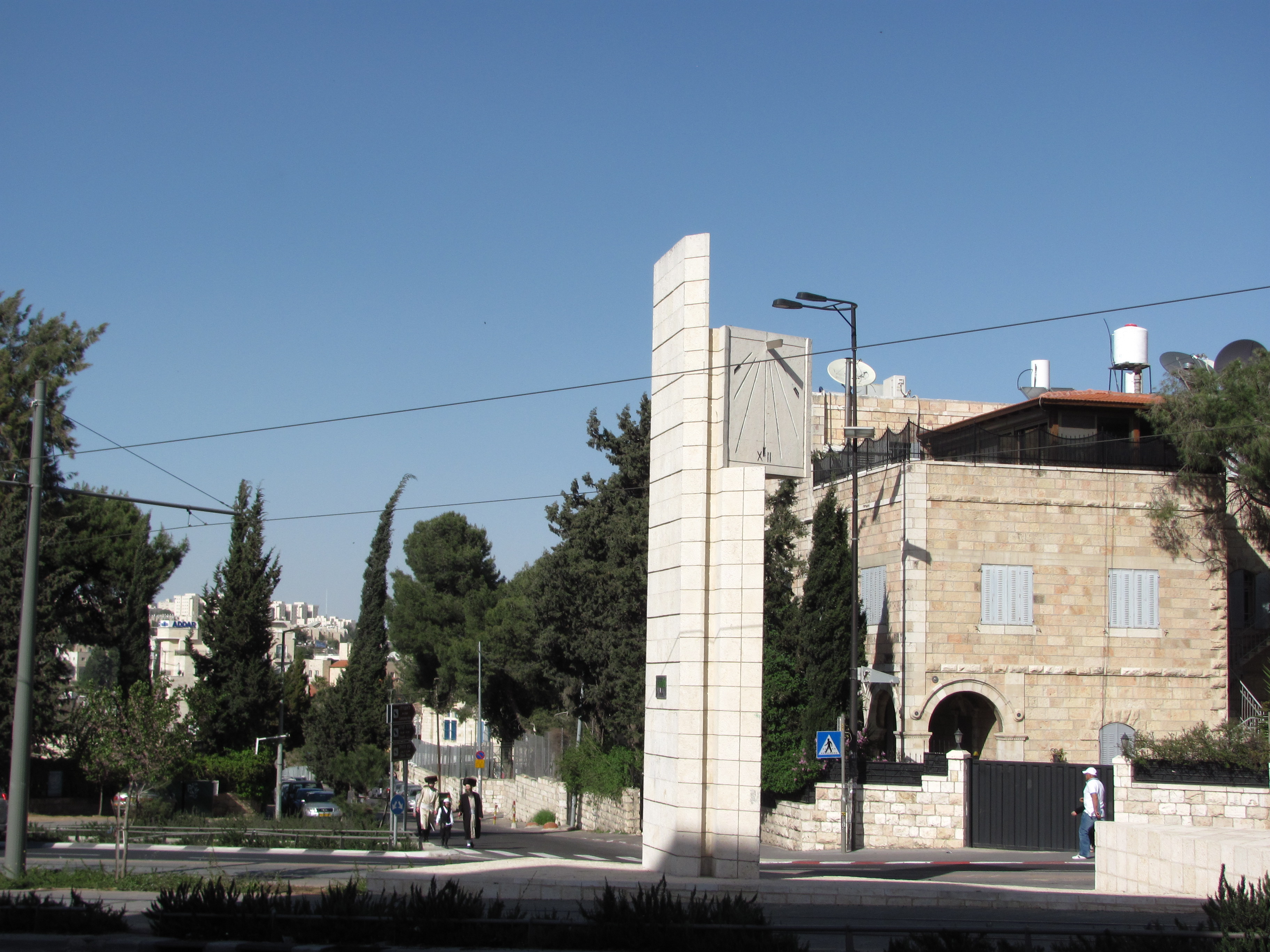
A sundial marks the former site of the Mandelbaum Gate crossing.

The 1949 Armistice Agreements put Shmuel HaNavi Street parallel to the Jordanian border, with a no man's land of barbed wire and minefields separating it from Ammunition Hill to the north. From 1949 to 1967 the official crossing point between Israeli- and Jordanian-held territory stood at the eastern end of Shmuel HaNavi Street at a checkpoint called the Mandelbaum Gate. This checkpoint was named after the destroyed Mandelbaum House, whose ruins lay nearby. Clergy, diplomats and United Nations personnel used the 50 yards (46 m) gateway to pass through the concrete and barbed wire barrier between the sectors, but Jordanian officials allowed only one-way passage for non-official traffic. Anyone with an Israeli stamp in his or her passport was denied passage.

After the Six-Day War and the reunification of Jerusalem, the Israelis dismantled the Mandelbaum Gate. Today a sundial standing in the middle of the Jerusalem Light Rail tracks near the beginning of Shmuel HaNavi Street marks the site where the Gate once stood.

=== Shmuel HaNavi neighborhood ===
To reinforce its claim on the territory on its side of the 1949 armistice line, in the early 1960s the Jerusalem municipality erected a complex of "long train" tenement buildings built in the manner of fortresses. The Israel Housing Ministry mandated that the external concrete walls of the buildings be three times the normal thickness to withstand shelling. The roofs of the buildings had raised parapets fitted with gun slots. The buildings themselves were arranged in a "confusing zig-zag pattern" to slow down Arab armies that might charge the complex, and the courtyards between the buildings were designed to accommodate mass mobilization of Israeli troops in the event of an attack.

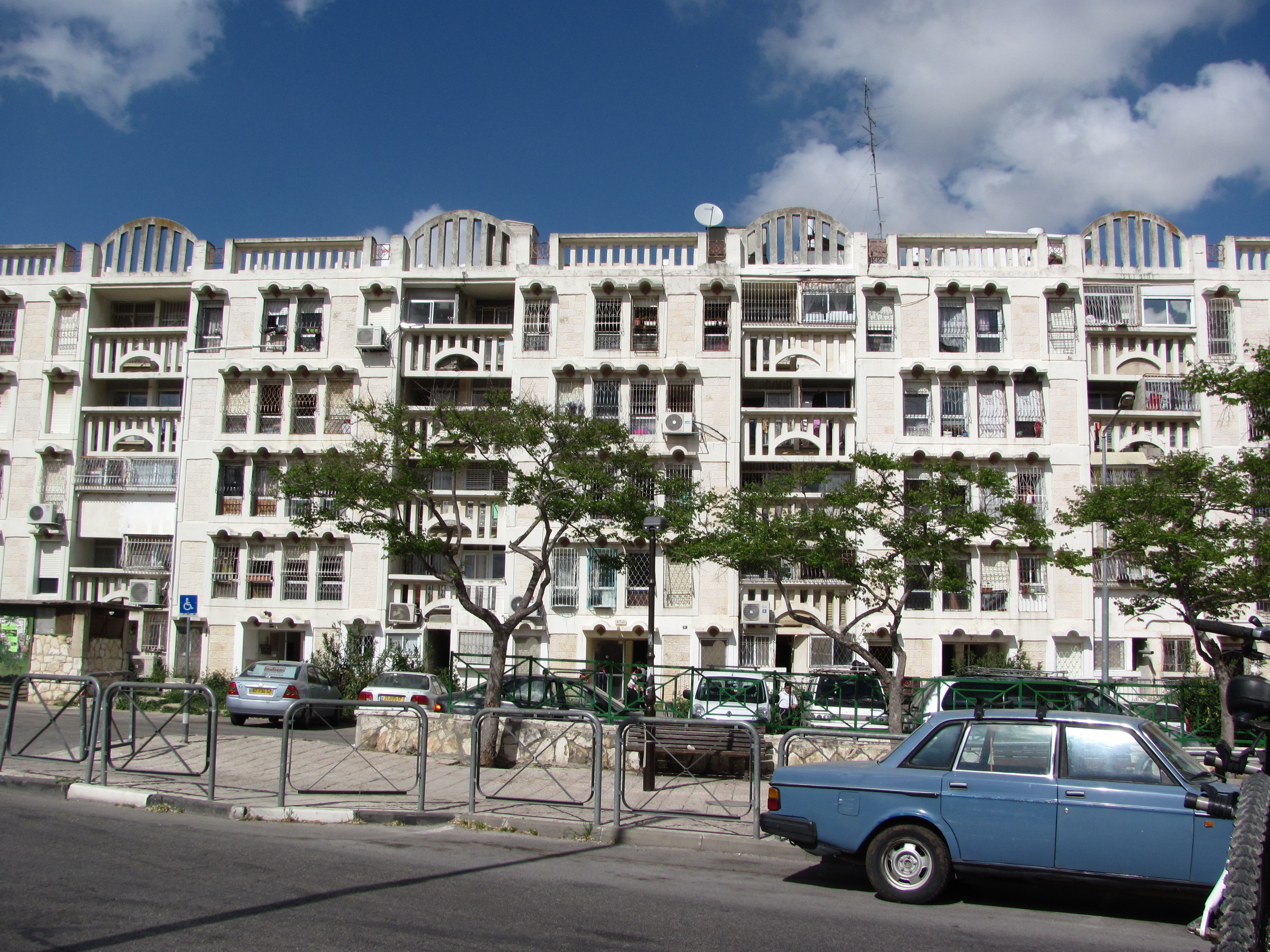
The renovated facade of the Shmuel HaNavi apartment buildings.

This housing project, known as Shikun Shmuel HaNavi (Shmuel HaNavi neighborhood), was largely populated by Sephardi Jewish immigrants from North Africa. The overcrowded conditions and lack of infrastructure quickly turned it into a slum. In the late 1970s an urban protest movement called Ohalim established a branch here, initiating cultural and productive activities for disadvantaged youth and elderly. In the 1980s the neighborhood was significantly upgraded as part of Project Renewal, a national urban renewal program that upgraded housing, infrastructure and utilities in 84 Israeli neighborhoods between 1977 and 1984. A new facade was added to each building in the complex and apartments were enlarged or combined to create larger living quarters.

As the first generation of immigrant children matured and left the neighborhood, their parents followed, and Haredi families from Mea Shearim, Bukharim and Geula took their place. In the 1990s the corner of Shmuel HaNavi and Bar-Ilan Streets was the site of frequent protests to close both streets to traffic on the Jewish Sabbath, a law that was eventually enforced. According to a 1997 appeal by the Ministry of Transportation to the Supreme Court of Israel on the closure, "almost 100% of the residents living in the vicinity of the Shmuel HaNavi and Jeremiah Streets, as far as Shamgar Street, are all religious or Ultra-Orthodox".

=== 1997–99 Jerusalem stabbings ===
A number of the 1997–99 Jerusalem stabbings took place on Shmuel HaNavi Street. The serial stabbings were carried out by an ultra-orthodox Jew on Palestinian workers, killing three and injuring seven others.

=== Shmuel HaNavi bus bombing ===
In 2004 a suicide bomber dressed as a Haredi Jew boarded a crowded #2 bus on its return route from the Western Wall and detonated himself as it turned the corner to Shmuel HaNavi Street. The bus was filled with Haredi families with small children; 23 were killed and more than 130 wounded.

=== 2014 Jerusalem tractor attack ===
In 2014 an Arab workman took a tractor from a work site and went on a terror rampage, overturning a bus with the Arab driver inside, killing one person and wounding several.

In October 2015 an Arab terrorist stabbed and lightly wounded a 16-year-old Jewish teenager on Shmuel Hanavi Street.

== Archeological discoveries ==
Evidence for the presence of the Third Wall of the New City from the time of King Agrippa I has been found on Shmuel HaNavi Street. Reinforcing this connection, Simcha Mandelbaum found coins from the Bar Kokhba era on the site of his new house at the beginning of the street. The Talmud (Zevachin 107a) and the author of Kaftor VeFerach cite a location near or on the street as the site where the deshen (ashes) from sacrifices on the Temple Altar were deposited.

Roman tombs and ossuaries have also been found on Shmuel HaNavi Street. A few hundred meters north of the western end of the street lies the Second Temple-era Tombs of the Sanhedrin in a large park.

In July 2009 archaeologists discovered an ancient quarry on Shmuel HaNavi Street, near the intersection with Yehezkel Street, during new residential construction. The quarter-acre (one-dunam) area was thought to be part of a larger network of quarries extending from Musrara to Sanhedria, from which the giant stones used by King Herod in the construction of the Second Temple (first century BC) were hewn.

== Cultural institutions ==
From 1941 to 1947 the street was home to the Jerusalem Biblical Zoo founded by Professor Aharon Shulov of the Hebrew University of Jerusalem.

== Present-day landmarks ==
=== Synagogues ===
- Beis Yosef Tzvi – Dushinsky (headquarters of the Dushinsky Hasidic dynasty
- Sadigura

=== Boys’ schools ===
- Talmud Torah Eitz Chaim
- Talmud Torah Ramat HaTorah
- Talmud Torah Kedushat HaTorah – Sadigura
- Talmud Torah Zhvill

=== Girls’ seminaries ===
- Bais Yaakov Maalot seminary
- Nachlas Bais Yaakov seminary
- Neve Yisrael Seminary
- Tehillas Bais Yaakov seminary

=== Yeshivas ===
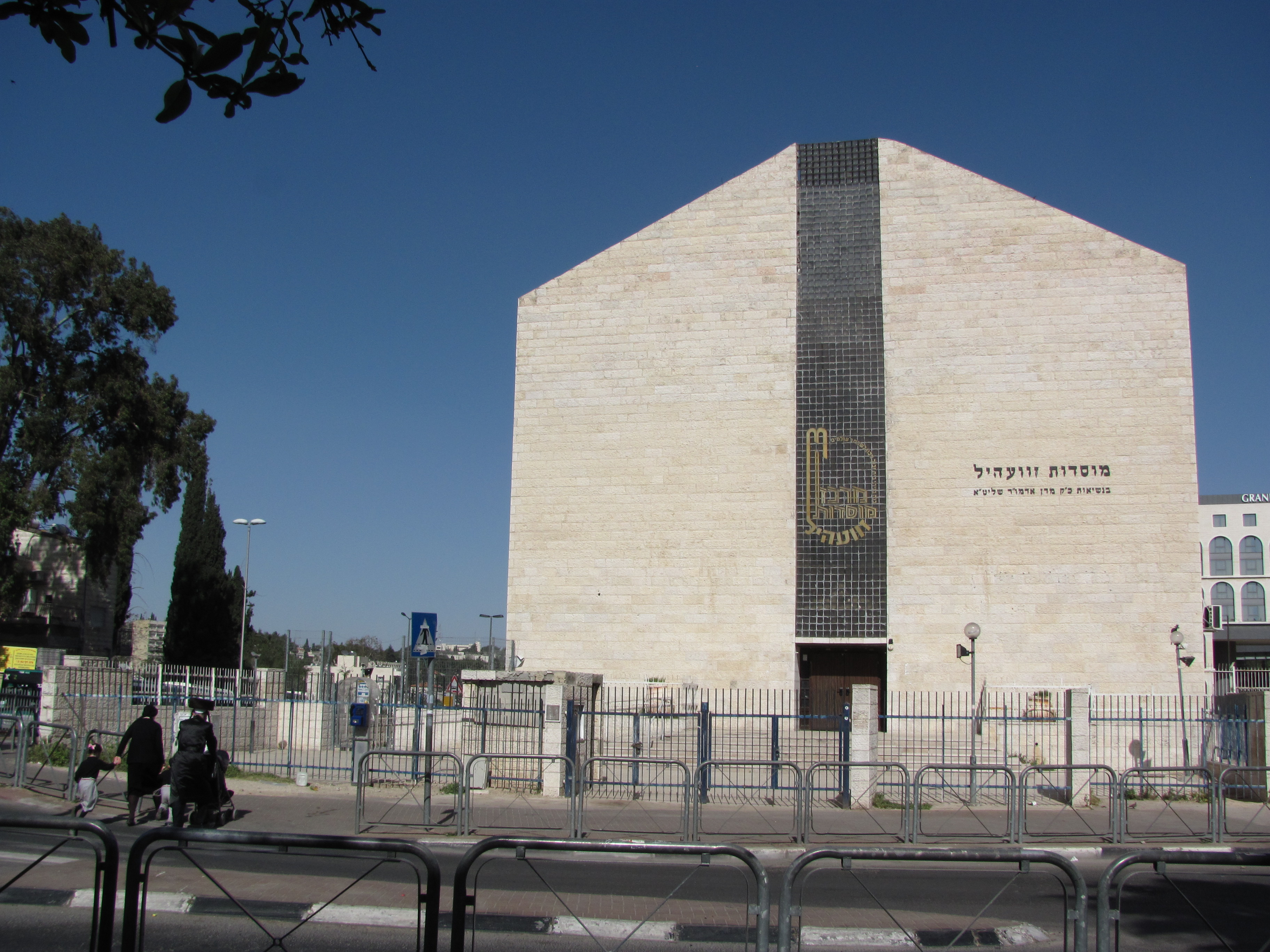
The imposing facade of the Zhvill yeshiva gedola

- Ahavat Moshe yeshiva and kollel (Breslov)
- Beis Yosef Tzvi Dushinsky yeshiva gedola
- Chut shel Chessed
- Eitz Chaim yeshiva
- Shaarei Torah Hasidic yeshiva gedola
- Tiferet Tzvi yeshiva
- Yeshivat HaRaayon HaYehudi (Yeshiva of the Jewish Idea), founded by Meir Kahane on Shmuel HaNavi Street in 1989 and relocated to Kfar Tapuach in 2001
- Zhvill yeshiva gedola

== Notable residents ==
- Ben Zion Abba Shaul
- Yisroel Moshe Dushinsky, Second Dushinsky Rebbe
- Yosef Tzvi Dushinsky, Third Dushinsky Rebbe
- Sadigura Rebbe

== Sources ==
- Bird, Kai (2010). Crossing Mandelbaum Gate: Coming of age between the Arabs and Israelis, 1956-1978. Simon and Schuster. ISBN 978-1-4165-4440-1.
- Hasson, Shlomo (1993). Urban Social Movements in Jerusalem: The protest of the second generation. SUNY Press. ISBN 0-7914-1428-0.
- Israeli, Raphael (2002). Jerusalem Divided: The armistice regime, 1947-1967. Routledge. ISBN 0-7146-5266-0.
- Rossoff, Dovid (2001). Where Heaven Touches Earth: Jewish life in Jerusalem from medieval times to the present (6 ed.). Feldheim Publishers. ISBN 0-87306-879-3.
