= Yosef Tzvi Dushinsky (third Dushinsky rebbe) =

Third Rebbe of the Dushinsky Hasidic dynasty

Grand Rabbi Yosef Tzvi Dushinsky יוסף צבי דושינסקי
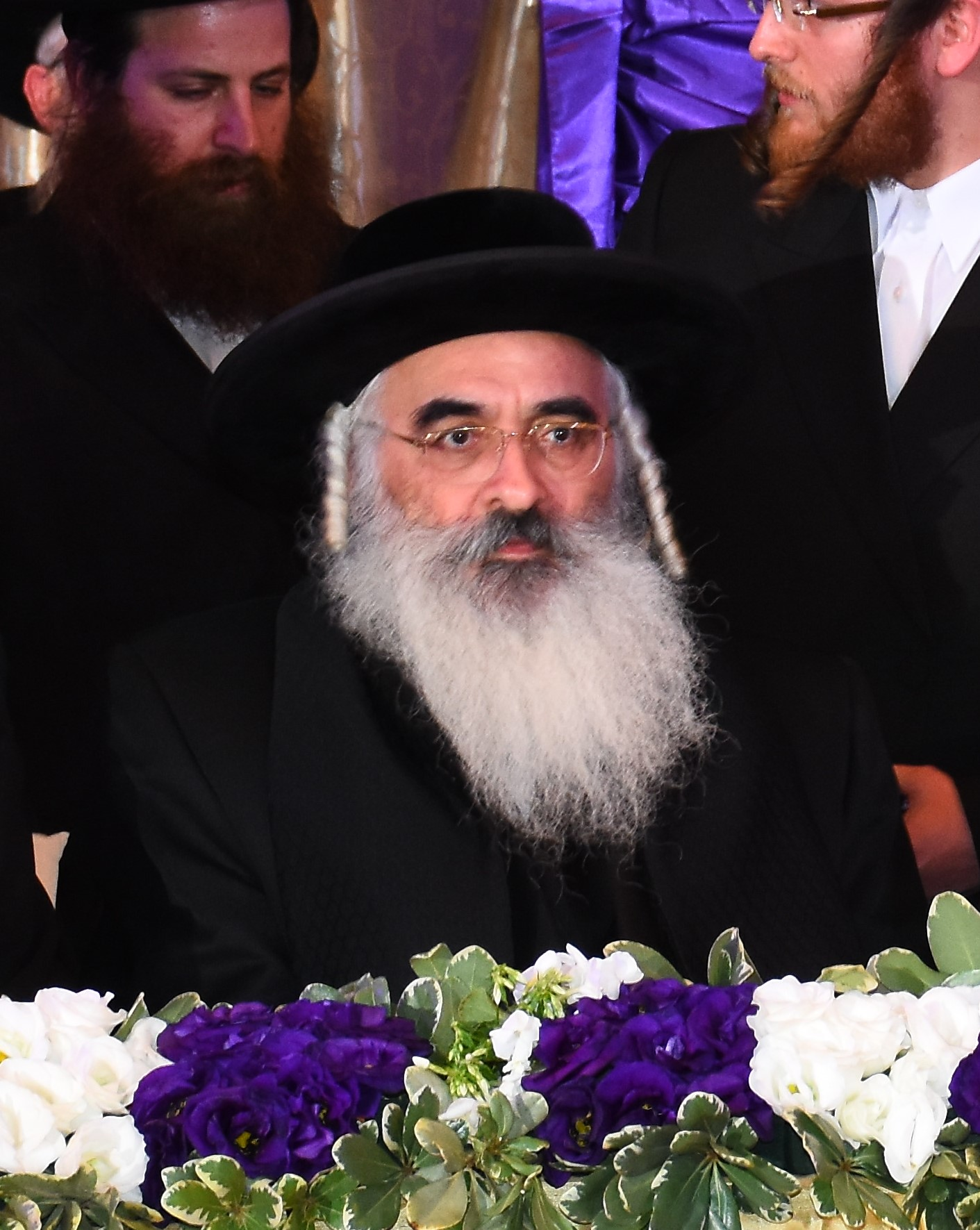
- Title: Third Dushinsky Rebbe

Personal life
- Parent: Grand Rabbi Yisrael Moshe Dushinsky
- Dynasty: Dushinsky

Religious life
- Religion: Judaism

Jewish leader
- Predecessor: Grand Rabbi Yisroel Moshe Dushinsky
- Began: 2003
- Residence: Jerusalem
- Dynasty: Dushinsky

Yosef Tzvi Dushinsky (Hebrew: יוסף צבי דושינסקי) is the third Rebbe of the Dushinsky Hasidic dynasty of Jerusalem, Israel. He assumed the leadership of the Hasidut upon the death of his father, Rabbi Yisroel Moshe Dushinsky, second Dushinsky Rebbe, in 2003. The Dushinsky Hasidic movement was founded by his grandfather and namesake, Rabbi Yosef Tzvi Dushinsky, in Jerusalem in the 1930s. Both his father and grandfather also served as Gaavad (chief rabbi) of the Edah HaChareidis.

He has one brother, Rabbi Mordechai Yehuda Dushinsky, who is Rav of the Dushinsky community in Beit Shemesh.

The Rebbe heads Yeshivas Beis Yosef Tzvi, the movement's flagship yeshiva on Shmuel HaNavi Street in Jerusalem, as well as the movement's other educational institutions, which have close to 3,000 students in Jerusalem, Bnei Brak, Ashdod, and other locales.

He and his family reside in the Shmuel HaNavi neighborhood of Jerusalem. He is the son-in-law of Rav Zalman Leib Meisels, the Seagate Rov.

== Rebbes of Dushinsky ==
1. Rabbi Yosef Tzvi Dushinsky (1867–1948)
2. Rabbi Yisroel Moshe Dushinsky (1921–2003), son of Yosef Tzvi Dushinsky
3. Rabbi Yosef Tzvi Dushinsky, son of Yisroel Moshe Dushinsky
