= Yosef Tzvi Dushinsky (first Dushinsky rebbe) =

Israeli rabbi

Rabbi Yosef Tzvi Dushinsky
- יוסף צבי דושינסקי
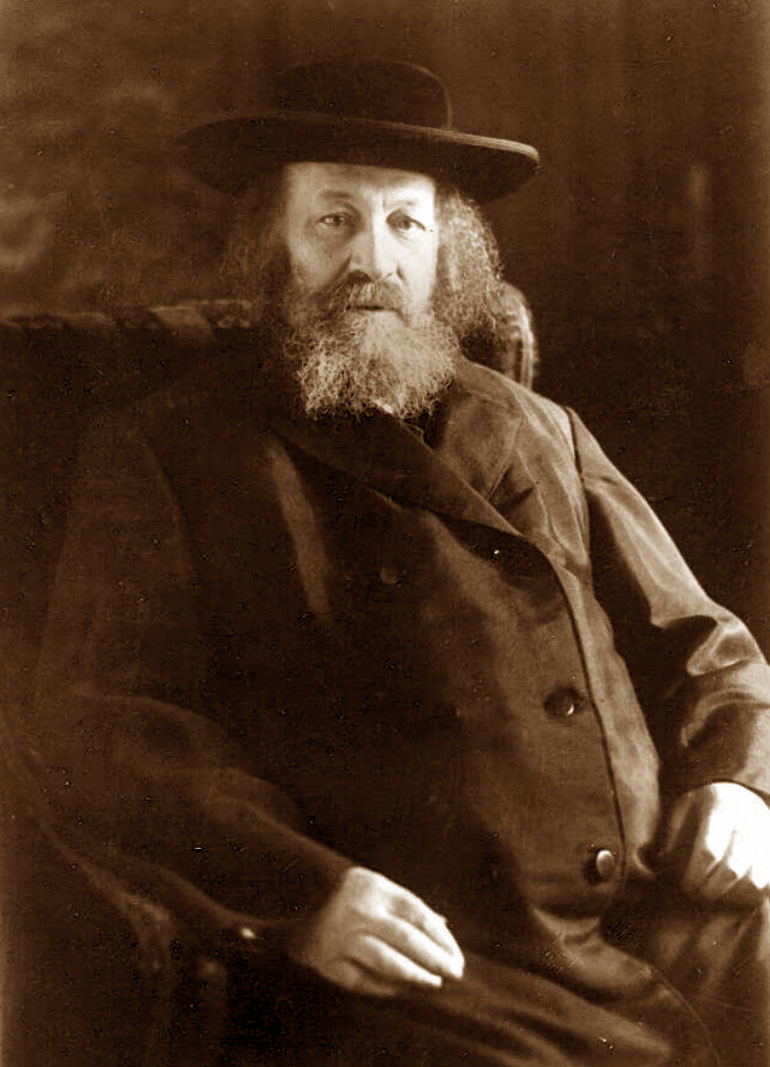
- Yosef Tzvi Dushinsky

Chief Rabbi of the Edah HaChareidis

Personal life
- Born: 1867 Paks, Hungary
- Died: 17 October 1948 (aged 80–81) Jerusalem, Israel
- Spouse: Sheindel (died), Esther Neuhaus
- Children: Yisroel Moshe Dushinsky
- Parent(s): Yisroel and Sara Elka Dushinsky
- Known for: Anti-Zionist stance, founding the Dushinsky Hasidic dynasty
- Other name: Maharitz
- Occupation: Rabbi, Chief Rabbi (Gavad) of the Edah HaChareidis

Religious life
- Religion: Judaism
- Denomination: Orthodox

Yosef Tzvi Dushinsky (Hebrew: יוסף צבי דושינסקי; 1867 – 17 October 1948), also known as the Maharitz, was the first Rebbe of Dushinsky and Grand Patriarch (Ga'avad) of the Edah HaChareidis, as well as their Chief Rabbi of Jerusalem, previously having held the title over Agudat Yisrael as well.

== Early life ==
Dushinsky was born in Paks, Hungary, to Yisroel and Sara Elka Dushinsky. He was a disciple of the author of Shevet Sofer, one of the grandchildren of the Chassam Sofer.

After his marriage to Sheindel, the daughter of Rabbi Mordechai Winkler, author of Levushei Mordechai, Dushinsky became the Chief Rabbi in Galanta, Slovakia. In an epidemic during World War I, his wife died, leaving no children. He subsequently remarried Esther Neuhaus, daughter of Rabbi Yoel Tzvi Neuhaus. He relocated to the town of Chust to assume the position of Chief Rabbi. In 1921, his only child, Yisroel Moshe, was born.

== Move to Jerusalem ==
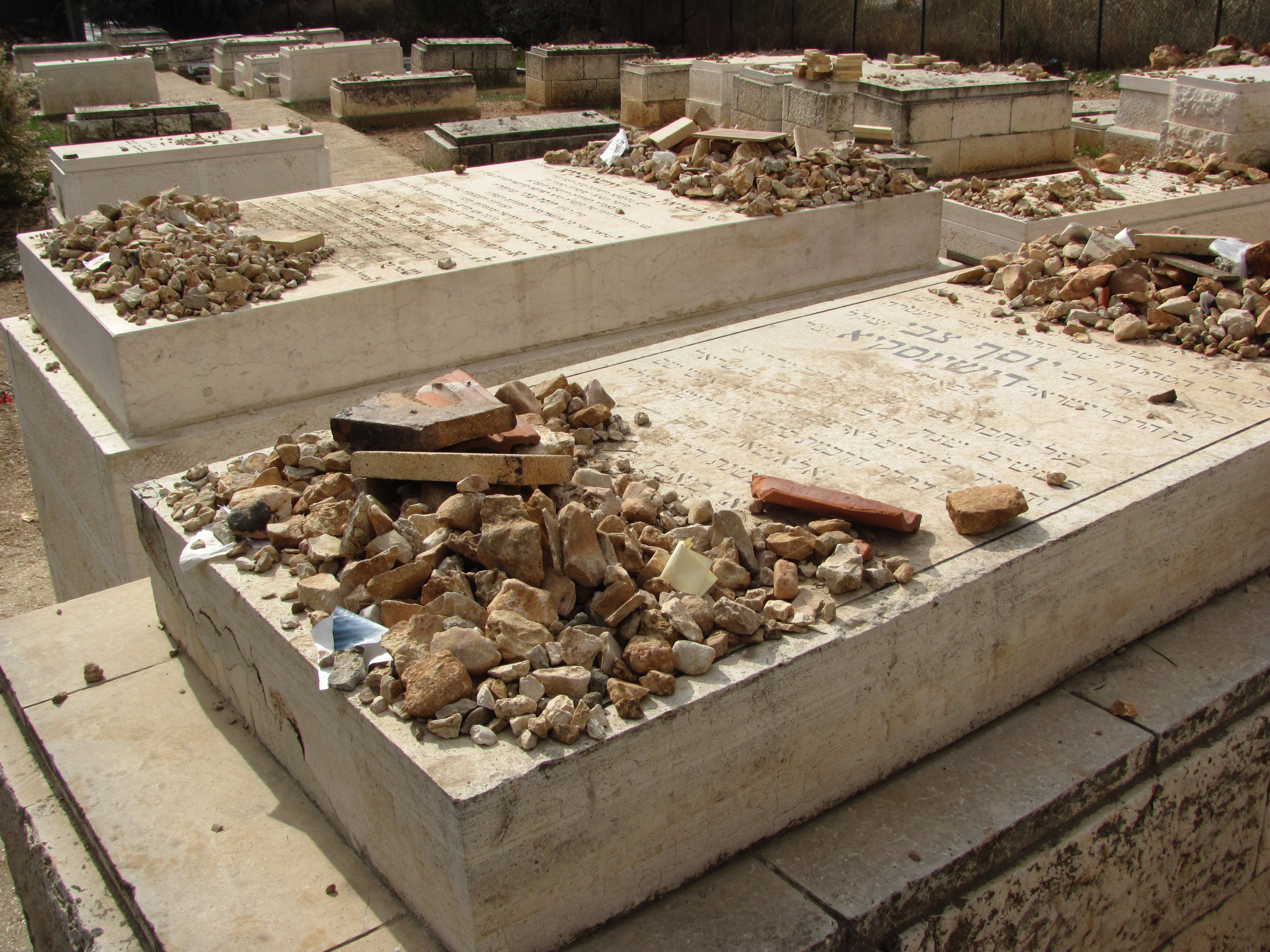
Graves of the First Dushinsky Rebbe, Rabbi Yosef Tzvi Dushinsky (foreground) and his son, the Second Dushinsky Rebbe, Rabbi Yisrael Moshe Dushinsky (background), in the Shaare Zedek Cemetery, Jerusalem.

In 1930, the Dushinsky family moved to the British Mandate of Palestine, settling in Jerusalem. Shortly after in 1932 came the death of the Chief Rabbi and founder of the Edah HaChareidis, Rabbi Yosef Chaim Sonnenfeld. Dushinsky was appointed as his successor. He founded a community of Hungarian Jews in Jerusalem, affiliated with the Perushim section of the Edah HaChareidis. This community gradually developed into a Hasidic dynasty, which is today headed by his grandson, who was named after him.

Dushinsky was known for his strong opposition to Zionism, and spoke to the newly formed United Nations against the creation of the State of Israel.

In fall 1948 Dushinsky was hospitalized in the Shaarei Zedek Hospital on Jaffa Road under the care of Dr. Moshe Wallach, director-general of the hospital. He died on the eve of Sukkot 1948 and was buried in the small cemetery adjacent to the hospital, which was used as a temporary burial ground during the 1948 Arab-Israeli War when the Jewish cemetery on the Mount of Olives was inaccessible. He was succeeded by Rabbi Zelig Reuven Bengis as Chief Rabbi of the Edah HaChareidis, and by his son, Rabbi Yisroel Moshe Dushinsky, as leader of the Dushinsky Hasidim, which would under the latter's leadership turn into one of the newest Hasidic dynasties.

== Publications ==
His Torah commentaries have been published in the Toras Maharitz series.

== Maalot Harav Dushinsky ==
The Jerusalem Municipality sought to honor Dushinsky after his death with the naming of a street, but his son refused for fear that any Shabbat desecration that occurred on the street (e.g. the driving of cars on the Shabbat) would cause pain to his father's soul. After many requests, his son agreed to the naming of a passageway of stairs in the Pagi (Sanhedria) neighborhood after his father, since cars could not access this path.

== Rebbes of Dushinsky ==
1. Rabbi Yosef Tzvi Dushinsky (1867–1948)
2. Rabbi Yisroel Moshe Dushinsky (1921–2003), son of Yosef Tzvi Dushinsky
3. Rabbi Yosef Tzvi Dushinsky, son of Yisroel Moshe Dushinsky

== Sources ==
- Rossoff, Dovid (2005). קדושים אשר בארץ: קברי צדיקים בירושלים ובני ברק [The Holy Ones in the Earth: Graves of Tzaddikim in Jerusalem and Bnei Brak] (in Hebrew). Jerusalem: Machon Otzar HaTorah. p. 386.
