= Yosef Chaim Sonnenfeld =

Rabbi and Charedi Council of Jerusalem co-founder (1848–1932)

Rabbi Yosef Chaim Sonnenfeld
- יוסף חיים זוננפלד יוסף חיים זאנענפעלד
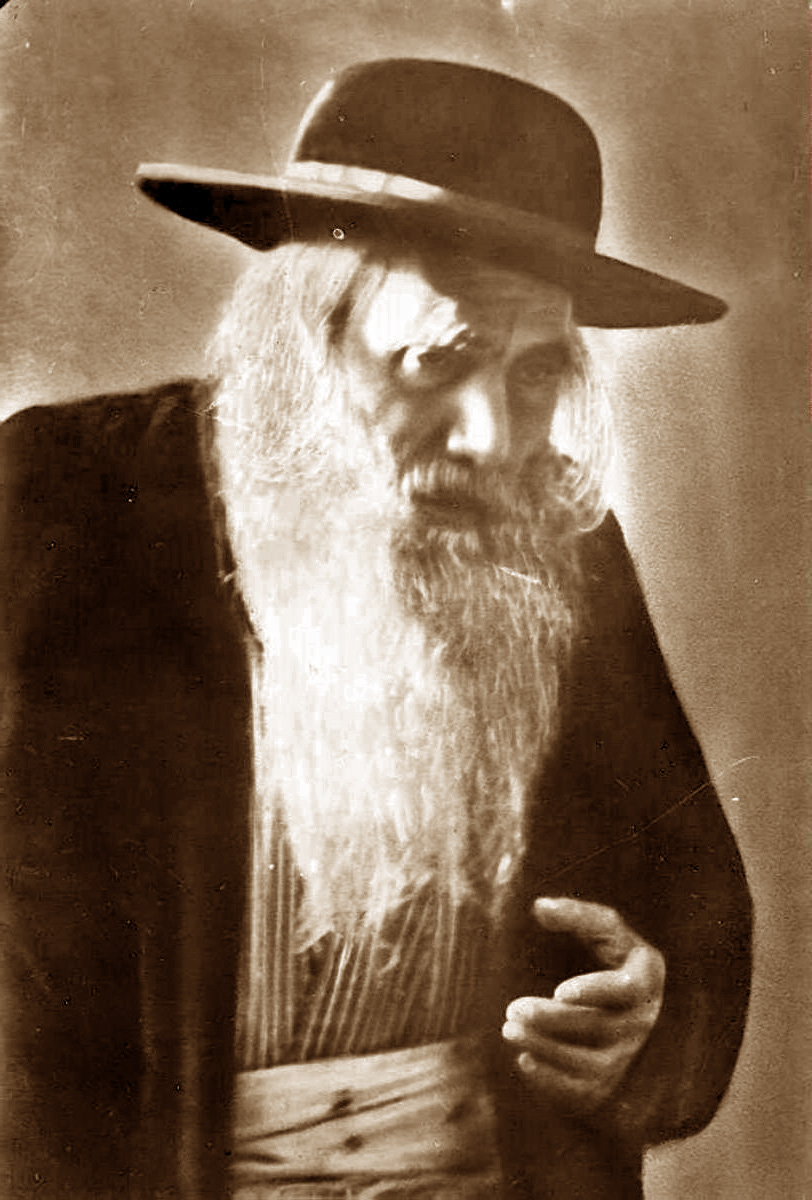
- Born: 1 December 1848; Vrbové, Piešťany District, Nyitra County, Kingdom of Hungary, Austrian Empire (present-day Slovakia)
- Died: 26 February 1932 (aged 83); Jerusalem, Mandatory Palestine
- Burial place: Mount of Olives
- Occupations: Rabbi, Rabbinic Judge
- Organization: Edah HaChareidis
- Title: Grand Patriarch of the Court of Jerusalem, Master of the Land of Israel
- Successor: Rabbi Yosef Tzvi Dushinsky
- Movement: Anti-Zionist

Signature
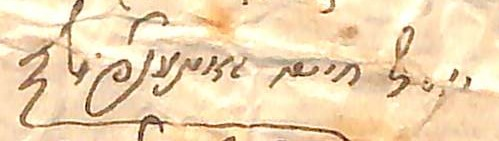

Yosef Chaim Sonnenfeld, also spelled Zonnenfeld (Hebrew: יוסף חיים זוננפלד, romanized: Yosef Chaim Zonenfeld; 1 December 1848 – 26 February 1932), was the rabbi and co-founder of the Edah HaChareidis, the Haredi Jewish community of Jerusalem, during the years of the British Mandate of Palestine. He was noted for his vehement opposition to Zionism.

== Early life ==
Sonnenfeld was born in Verbó in the Austrian Empire on December 1, 1848. His father, Rabbi Avraham Shlomo Sonnenfeld, died when Yosef Chaim was five years old. He completed his elementary schooling at age eight, and after hearing that his step-father wanted to send him to Gymnasium, he fled back to Verbó, where he learnt under Rabbi Chaim Tzvi Mannheimer. At sixteen he received the title "Chaver", and went to study under Rabbi Samuel Benjamin Sofer (the Ksav Sofer). In 1870 he was ordained as rabbi, and married the daughter of a wealthy merchant from Kobersdorf, where he lived after his marriage, studying under Rabbi Abraham Shag-Zwebner. In 1873 Shag decided to emigrate to Palestine, and Sonnenfeld decided to follow along, settling in Jerusalem.

== Jerusalem ==
Sonnenfeld was the right-hand man of Yehoshua Leib Diskin and assisted the latter in communal activities, such as the founding of schools and the Diskin Orphanage, and fighting against secularism and Zionism.

Sonnenfeld was one of the leaders of the Hungarian Kollel Shomrei HaChomos in Jerusalem, and was the president of the Burial Society.

During Kaiser Wilhelm's visit to Jerusalem in 1898, Sonnenfeld refused to meet with the Kaiser, citing the tradition of the Vilna Gaon that descendants of Amalek were in Germany, and would thus be wrong to greet him.

In the winter of 1913, Sonnenfeld took part in what is known as the "Journey of the Rabbis", led by Abraham Isaac Kook. Alongside this delegation of rabbis, he travelled to the newly established secular settlements ("moshavot") in Samaria and Galilee in an effort to strengthen religiosity and Torah Judaism. Whilst Sonnenfeld and Kook had a level of mutual respect for each other, there remained strong disagreements between the two rabbis on numerous issues, especially Zionism. This heated disagreement even led to Sonnenfeld banning Kook's well known philosophical books, "Orot".

Sonnenfeld did not want the Orthodox Jewish community to become subject to Zionist authority and often referred to the Zionists as "evil men and ruffians", claiming that "Hell had entered the Land of Israel with Herzl." Sonnenfeld's top diplomat, Dr. Jacob Israël de Haan, endeavored to form an alliance with the Arab nationalist leadership and hoped to reach an agreement that would allow unrestricted Jewish settlement in Arab lands in return for the relinquishment of Jewish political aspirations. In June 1924, de Haan was assassinated by the Haganah after having conveyed his proposals to King Hussein and his sons, Faisal and Abdullah.

Eventually Sonnenfeld founded the Edah HaChareidis along with Rabbi Yitzchok Yerucham Diskin in 1918, to separate from the Zionist-controlled Community Council of Jerusalem. Sonnenfeld had previously been the de facto chief rabbi of Jerusalem since 1909, after the death of Rabbi Shmuel Salant, but only accepted the official title in 1920, in order to counter the establishment of the Chief Rabbinate by the Zionist movement under British auspices.

Sonnenfeld died on February 26, 1932, and was interred on the Mount of Olives in Jerusalem, beside his former teacher Rabbi Avrohom Shag.

== Works ==
Sonnenfeld wrote scholarly commentaries on the Torah, Talmud, and Shulchan Aruch. His responsa are collected in the work Salmas Chaim.

== Gallery ==
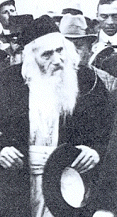
1

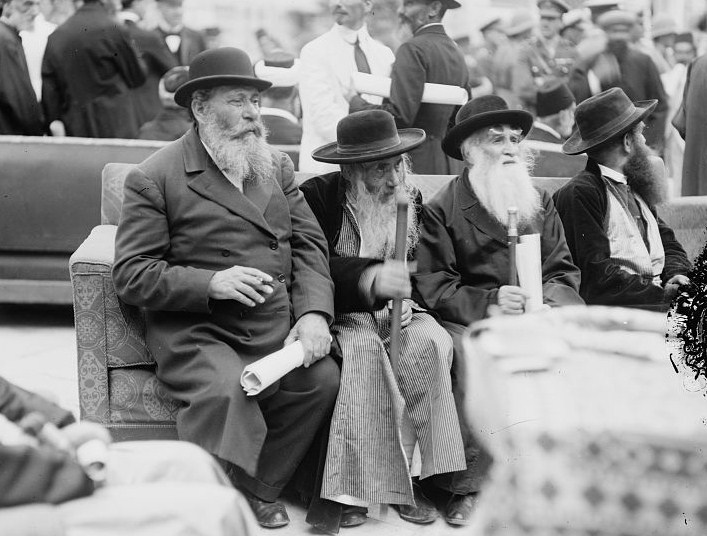
2 - 1920

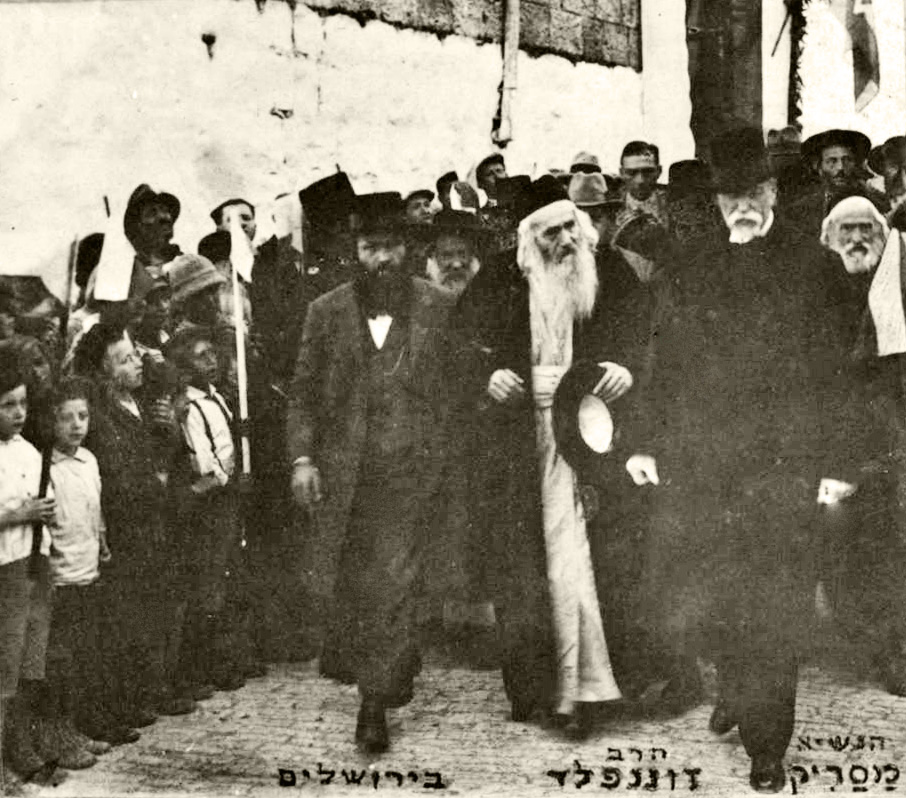
3 - 1927

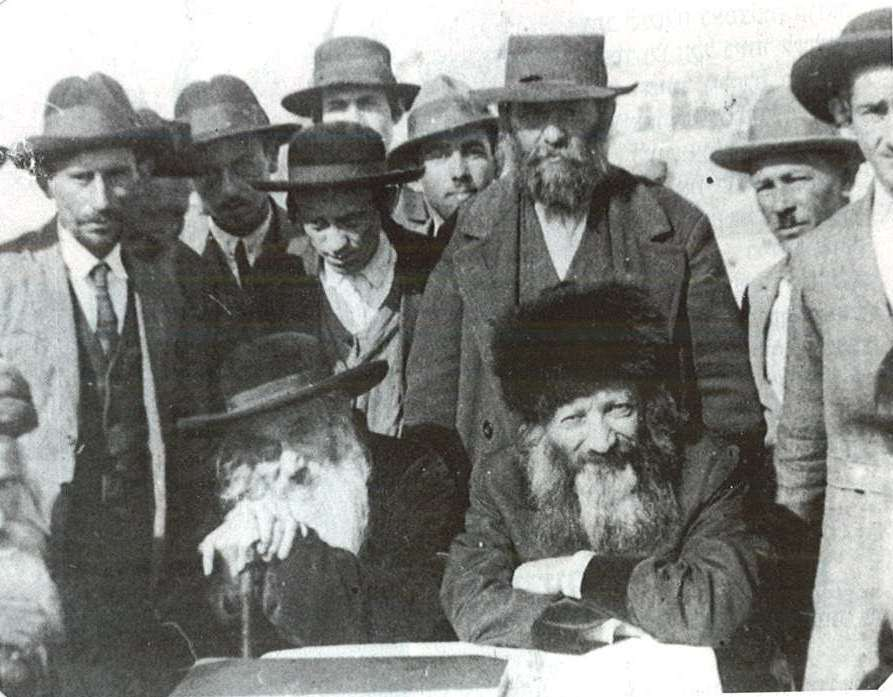
4 - 1930s

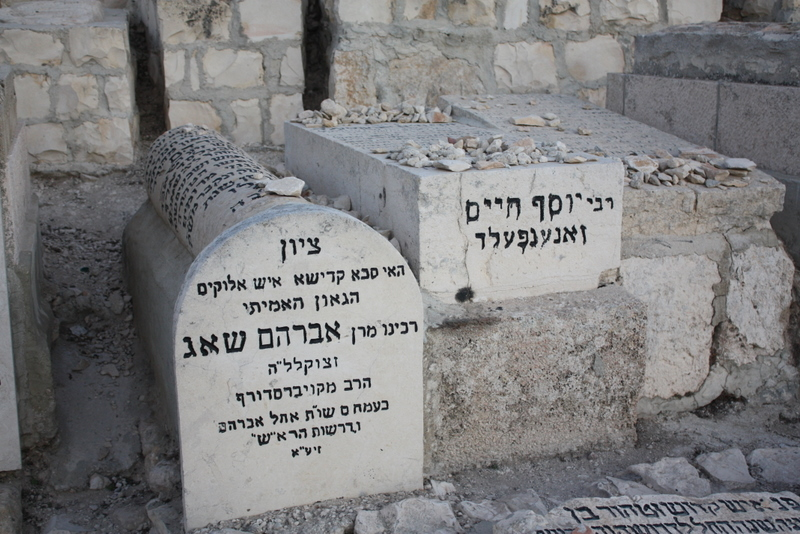
Sonnenfeld grave at the Mount of Olives Cemetery
1. Yoseph Chaïm Sonnenfeld during the years of the British mandate.
2. British High Commissioner's reception at Government House, Jerusalem, with texts of the Proclamation, 1920. L-R: Rabbis Moshe Leib Bernstein, Yosef Chaïm Sonnenfeld, Yerucham Diskin, and Baruch Reuven Jungreis.
3. Yoseph Chaïm Sonnenfeld receives Tomáš Garrigue Masaryk, President of Czechoslovakia, during the latter's visit to Jerusalem, 1927.
4. Yosef Chaïm Sonnenfeld (left) with Rabbi Abraham Isaac Kook, 1930s.
