= Brittany Mason =

American model

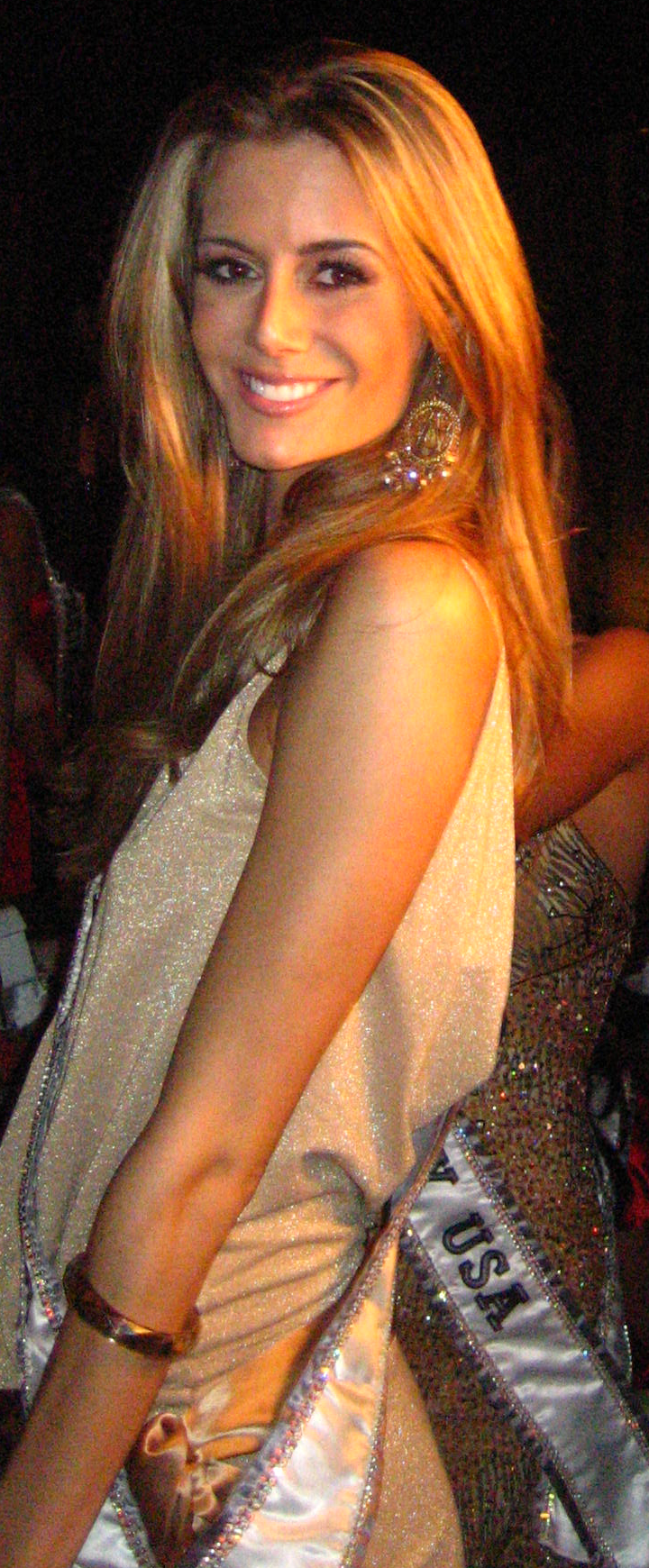
- Mason in 2008
- Born: Brittany Mason; September 1, 1986 (age 40); Anderson, Indiana, U.S.
- Occupation: Model
- Known for: Kentuckiana Teen Indiana; Top Teen Model USA 2004; Miss Indiana USA 2008; Teen Model of the World (Top 10); Miss USA 2008 (7th)
- Modeling information
- Height: 5 ft 10 in (1.78 m)
- Website: www.brittanymason.com

Brittany Mason (born September 1, 1986) is an American model, actress, activist and beauty pageant titleholder. In 2017, she became the national director for the Miss Universe Ireland franchise.

== Career ==
=== Modeling ===
Represented by Wilhelmina, Mason signed with her first modeling agency at the age of 16 and moved into a model apartment in New York City. Since, she has graced the Covers and pages of magazines such as Vogue, Cosmopolitan, Seventeen Magazine, Esquire, GQ, FHM and MAXIM. Mason has walked the runways around the globe in New York Fashion Week, China Fashion Week, Berlin Fashion Week and Miami Swimweek.

Brittany has worked with famed photographers such as John Russo, Patrick Demerchelier and has modeled for brands such as Valentino, Yves Saint Laurent, Anna Sui, Ferragamo, Bebe, Jovani and Wet & Wild Cosmetics.

Mason was the face of the 2010 John Frieda Go Blonder Campaign.

=== Film and television ===
Mason is a former student of Lee Strasberg in New York and has made several television appearances, most notably on the 200th episode of Two and a Half Men playing guest star Jason Alexander's secretary, Project Runway All Stars, and The American Country Music Awards 2010 & 2011. In 2013, she appeared on four episodes of The Face alongside Naomi Campbell and Coco Rocha.

== Early life ==
At the age of 16, Mason signed with her first modeling agency and moved into a model apartment in New York City. Shortly after she entered a local pageant and won the title of Teen Indiana. From there she won the national title of Teen Model of the USA which then advanced Mason internationally to represent the United States at Teen Model of the World. Out of 52 countries competing for the title to be most beautiful woman in the world, Mason placed as first runner up and Miss Photogenic. The competition was televised throughout Europe, Asia, and South America in 2004. In 2008, she was crowned Miss Indiana USA, for Donald Trump's Miss Universe Organization placing in 7th at Miss USA live on NBC.

== Activism and charity work ==
Mason is involved with several charitable causes. As a teen, Mason created an anti-bullying awareness and prevention program inspired from her own experiences. She worked with kindergarten level to even college students. In 2008, it is estimated Brittany worked with close to 100,000 students across the state of Indiana . Her hometown of Anderson awarded her with the Service to Mankind award for her philanthropic efforts for safer schools . In 2006, Mason organized fund-raising events to collect supplies for Mission of HOPE Haiti where she traveled to work at a children's shelter and hospital . In 2008, she joined Chelsea Clinton to campaign for Hillary Clinton in the Democratic presidential primary in Indiana and continued her work with the Democratic Party for presidential nominee Barack Obama. Mason also supports the Model Alliance which serves as a voice for models. In 2012 she studied fashion law at Fordham Law School under Susan Scafidi to further her work in hope to improve the industry and establish fair working rights for models.

Preceded by Jami Stallings	Miss Indiana USA; 2008	Succeeded by Venus Raj
