= Fashion Law Institute =

Council of Fashion Designers of America

- Founded: 2010
- Founder: Susan Scafidi
- Type: Educational
- Location: New York, United States
- Website: www.fashionlawinstitute.com

Established in 2010 with the support of Diane von Furstenberg and the Council of Fashion Designers of America, the Fashion Law Institute is the world's first academic center dedicated to legal and business issues pertaining to the fashion industry. The Fashion Law Institute's founder and academic director is Professor Susan Scafidi, who teaches at Fordham Law School. The Fashion Law Institute is a nonprofit organization recognized as a tax-exempt educational organization under the Section 501(c)(3) of the Internal Revenue Code.

== Programs ==
The Fashion Law Institute offers a range of programs aimed at assisting fashion lawyers, law students, design students, and members of the fashion community.

- The Fashion Law Pop-Up Clinic, which offers free legal consultations to emerging and independent designers, as well as other fashion professionals,
- The annual Fashion Law Institute symposium,
- Public educational events,
- Information on legal issues affecting the fashion industry, and
- A fashion law curriculum including such courses as Fashion Law, Fashion Modeling Law, Fashion Law & Finance, the Fashion Law Practicum, Fashion Retail Law, and Fashion Ethics, Sustainability, & Development.
- The first Fashion Law master's degrees, an LLM for lawyers and MSL (Masters of Studies in Law) for non-lawyers.

== Fashion Law Bootcamp ==
The Fashion Law Institute's Fashion Law Bootcamp is an annual summer intensive course of fashion law and business. Fashion Law Bootcamp has been held in New York since 2011. The West Coast version of Fashion Law Bootcamp is held in San Francisco and Silicon Valley.

Fashion Law Bootcamp has attracted fashion law influencers from around the world, including Brazil, the U.K., and Puerto Rico. Other Bootcamp alumni include Lara Miller, Bogdan Enica, Sarah Feingold, counsel for Etsy, Mimi Plange, Carrie Hammer, and supermodel Brittany Mason.

== Fashion shows ==
The Fashion Law Institute held fashion shows at the tents at Lincoln Center during the S/S 2013 and S/S 2014 Mercedes Benz Fashion Weeks in New York City. The shows featured emerging designers and highlighted the Institute's Fashion Law Pop-Up Clinic. The Fashion Law Institute's S/S 2014 show featured the first plus-size designer to show at the Fashion Week tents in Lincoln Center.

== Model advocacy ==
In 2012, the Fashion Law Institute assisted with the launch of the Model Alliance. Professor Scafidi serves as a member of the Model Alliance board, and attorney Doreen Small, who teaches the Fashion Law Institute's Fashion Modeling Law course, is a member of the Model Alliance's Advisory Board. Professors Scafidi and Small were both involved in the drafting and passage of a New York law giving models under the age of 18 the same legal protections as child performers, and in 2013, the Fashion Law Institute prepared the Council of Fashion Designers of America's guide to this newly enacted law. In 2018, Professors Scafidi and Small were appointed to the founding advisory board of the Humans of Fashion Foundation, an NGO dedicated to addressing sexual harassment and abuse in the fashion industry.

== Dolce & Gabbana v. Diet Prada lawsuit ==
In 2019, the Fashion Law Institute's Fashion Law Pop-Up Clinic became defense counsel for Diet Prada in a defamation lawsuit filed in Italy by Dolce & Gabbana. The main predicate of the lawsuit was Diet Prada's reposting of anti-Asian statements made by the brand's co-founder Stefano Gabbana, who described China as "the country of [5 poop emoji]" and "China Ignorant Dirty Smelling Mafia."

== See also ==
- Plus-size clothing
- Plus-size model
- Model Alliance
- Sara Ziff
- Council of Fashion Designers of America
