= Religious clothing =

Dress which has a special significance to a faith group

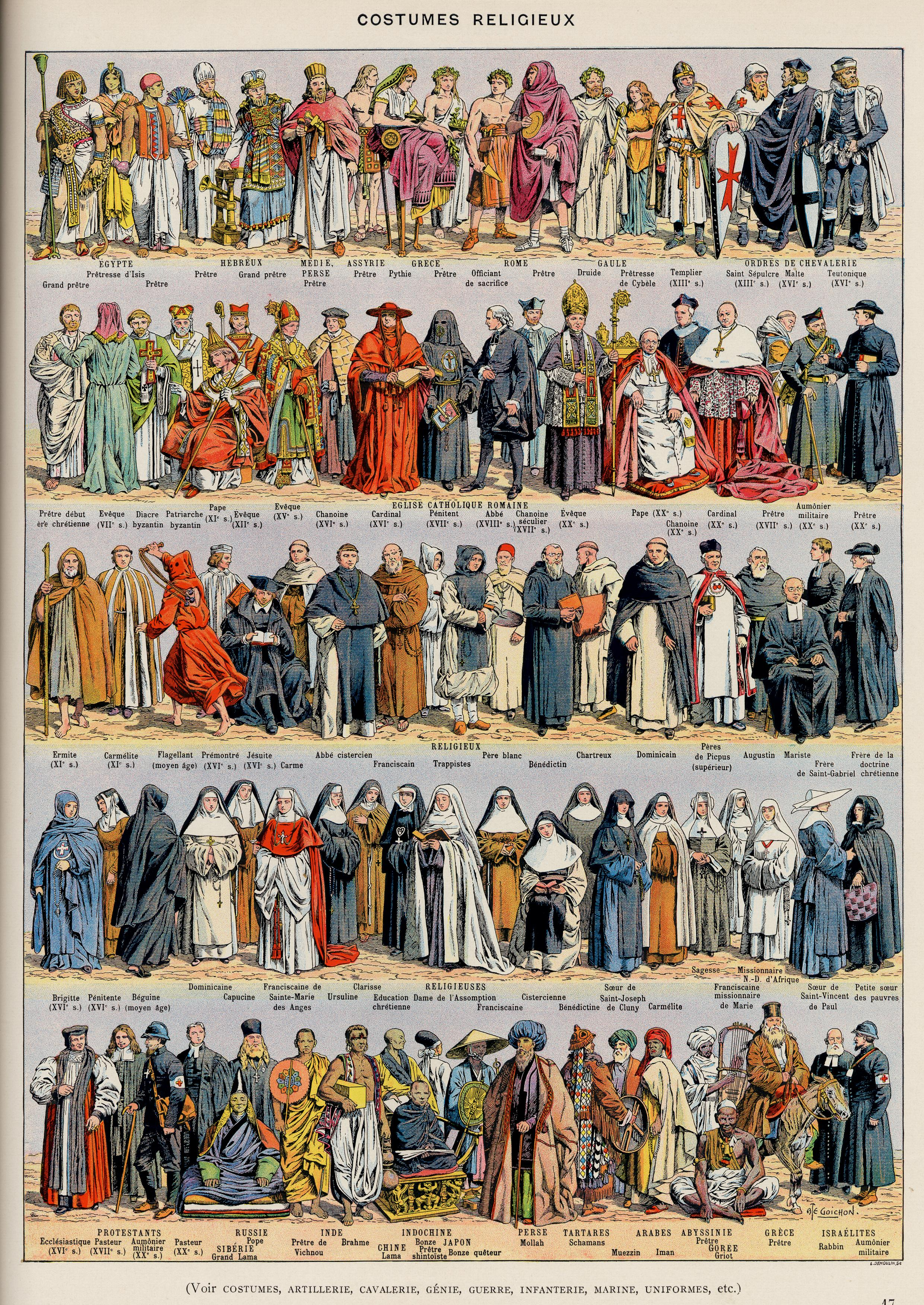
Plate showing historical religious clothing. From French encyclopedia Larousse du XXème siècle 1932.

Religious clothing is clothing which is worn in accordance with religious practice, tradition or significance to a faith group. It includes clerical clothing such as cassocks, and religious habit, robes, and other vestments. Accessories include hats, wedding rings, crucifixes, etc.

== Judaism ==
Tzitzit are specially knotted ritual fringes, or tassels worn by most Jewish men and boys during prayer. Tzitzit are attached to the four corners of the tallit (Jewish prayer shawl) and in more traditional communities are tied to all four-cornered garments.

Tefillin are black leather boxes made by hand which contain written passages from the Hebrew Bible, particularly the V'ahavta and secured to the arm and head with leather straps. These have been worn for at least the last 2,000 years and originated in pre-diaspora Judaism. These are almost exclusively worn by very religious Jews during weekday prayers, and not worn outside of religious functions in order to prevent one from 'defiling' them. Curiously, while Ashkenazi and some Sephardi men have the custom to wear these during prayer, many outlying communities such as the Beta Israel did not, until they were introduced to the custom by Israelis or Ashkenazi missionaries.

A kippah or yarmulke is a cloth head covering worn by Jews during prayer or other ritual services. Some wear it every day. In the United States, most synagogues and Jewish funeral services keep a ready supply of kippot for the temporary use of visitors who have not brought one.

A mitpachat, or tichel in Yiddish, is a headscarf worn by some religious Jewish women. It is customary for a married woman, but some women choose to wear them only during religious occasions.

Various formal hats are worn by Jewish men in Hasidic Jewish circles and sometimes in other traditional communities, generally on top of a yarmulke, generally reflecting a particular cultural background, and sometimes reflecting one's age, marital status, rabbinical rank or lineage. In general, hats are only worn on top of a yarmulke after a Jewish male reaches bar mitzvah age, although some communities, such as Belz and Viznitz, have boys under bar mitzvah age wear caps known as kaskets on top of their yarmulkes. Fedoras, generally black with a wide brim, are worn by men from Litvish, Yeshivish, and Chabad-Lubavitch communities, and these are worn by both single and married men. Homburg style hats are often worn by rabbis of higher rank in Litvish and Yeshivish circles. Derby hats are worn by Hasidic men in certain communities, sometimes signifying lay status as opposed to rabbinical status. Biber hats are worn by Hasidic men, both married and unmarried, in certain communities, with varied styles signifying which community one belongs to, or sometimes rabbinical status. Shtreimels are worn by married men (or previously married men, such as divorced men and widowers) in many Hasidic communities and the Sabbath, major holidays, and special occasions such as weddings; and by unmarried boys after bar mitzvah in certain traditional Jerusalemite communities, such as Toldos Aharon. Spodiks are worn by married (et al.) men in certain Hasidic communities originating in Poland on the same occasions when a shtreimel is worn in other communities, particularly the communities of Gur, Alexander, and Amshinov. Kolpiks are worn by unmarried boys over bar mitzvah age who are from rabbinical families, and by certain Hasidic rabbis on special occasions that are more than a regular weekday but not warranting the wearing of a shtreimel, such as lighting Hanukkah candles and conducting a tish on Rosh Chodesh or Tu B'Shvat. In Mizrachi communities, these are replaced by the more traditional sudra, or otherwise a turban typically wrapped from a modified keffiyeh. Other communities wear hats similar to the fez or the more common Bucharian styled kippah.

Rekel coats are worn by Hasidic lay men during weekdays, and by some on the Sabbath.

Some Ashkenazi Jewish men wear a frock coat during prayer and other specific occasions. It is commonly worn by Hasidic rabbis and Jewish religious leaders in public. The coat is more commonly known as a frak, a sirtuk, or a kapotteh.

Bekishe coats or robes are worn by Hasidic lay men on Sabbath and holidays, both single and married. In some non-Hasidic communities a bekishe may be worn either during prayer or at meals as well, on the Sabbath and holidays. Hasidic rabbis will wear a bekishe on weekdays as well, with their weekday hats. The bekishe worn by certain rabbis may have colors other than black, such as white, silver, gold, or blue, and may also be lined with velvet.

The kittel is a white robe worn on certain occasions by married men (and some women) in Ashkenazic and Hasidic communities, such as Yom Kippur and Passover Seder, and may be worn by those leading prayers (and in some communities by all married men) on Rosh Hashanah, Hoshanah Rabbah, and for Tefilas Tal and Tefilas Geshem. A groom will generally wear a kittel during his wedding ceremony as well. In some Sephardic communities, a rabbi or a hazzan may wear a similar white robe at weddings and at prayer services.

The gartel is a belt used by some Jewish men during prayer, particularly from Hasidic communities. "Gartel" is Yiddish for "belt." In older traditional Jewish communities, sashes were worn for the same effect, though non-European traditional clothing has fallen out of favor in Israel, and therefore most of these communities.

Red string in Kabbalah.

Wearing a thin red string (as a type of talisman) is a custom, popularly thought to be associated with Judaism's Kabbalah, in order to ward off misfortune brought about by an "evil eye" (עין הרע in Hebrew). In Yiddish, the red string is called a roite bindele. The red string itself is usually made from thin red wool thread. It is worn, or tied, as a type of bracelet or "band" on the left wrist of the wearer (the receiving side). The connection to traditional Judaism is disputed, and this is mostly worn by secular or non-Jewish spiritualist circles who often misunderstand the origins, or were sold manufactured versions within popular Israeli religious tourist attractions.

== Christianity ==
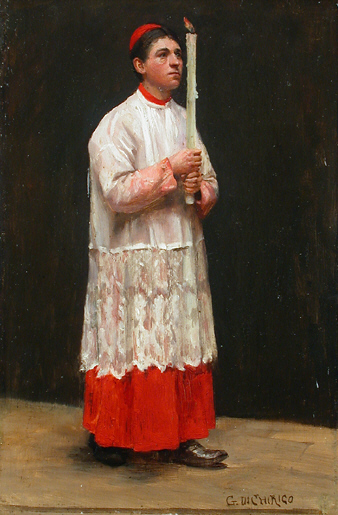
Il ministrante, by Giacomo di Chirico (1844–1883).

Vestments are liturgical garments and articles associated primarily with the Christian religions, especially Catholic, Eastern Orthodox, Anglicans, Methodists, and Lutheran Churches. Other groups also make use of vestments, but this was a point of controversy in the Protestant Reformation and sometimes since - notably during the Ritualist controversies in England in the 19th century. Clerical clothing is non-liturgical clothing worn exclusively by clergy. It is distinct from vestments in that it is not reserved specifically for services.

Women belonging to various Christian denominations (such as those of Conservative Anabaptist Christianity and Orthodox Christianity) practice Christian headcovering, a traditional practice since the days of the early Church. Additionally, some Christians practice the wearing of plain dress, notably traditional Anabaptists (such as Old Order Mennonites and Conservative Mennonites), Conservative Friends, and Methodists of the conservative holiness movement; for example, in its 2015 Book of Discipline, the Evangelical Wesleyan Church teaches that:

We require our women to appear in public with dresses of modest length, sleeves of modest length, modest necklines and modest hose; the wearing of split skirts, slacks, jeans, artificial flowers or feathers is forbidden. Moreover, we require our men to conform to the scriptural standards of decent and modest attire; we require that when they appear in public they wear shirts with sleeves of modest length. We require that all our people appear in public with sleeves below the elbows. Women's hemlines are to be modestly below the knees. Our people are forbidden to appear in public with transparent or immodest apparel, including shorts or bathing suits. Parents are required to dress their children modestly in conformity with our general principles of Christian attire. We further prohibit our people from participating in the practices of body-piercing, tattooing or body art.

=== Latter Day Saint movement ===
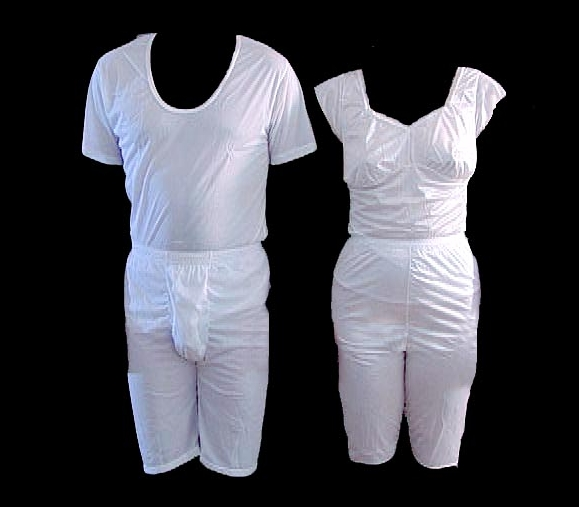
Mormon temple garment underwear for men (left) and women.

==== Temple garments ====
Adherents of The Church of Jesus Christ of Latter-day Saints (LDS Church) and some Mormon fundamentalist groups often receive temple garments at the time of receiving their endowment, after taking part in the endowment ritual in a temple. These religious undergarments are to be worn at all times (with the exception of certain activities such as exercise) under typical clothing. They date back to the early days of the Church, originating with the Church's first latter-day prophet, Joseph Smith, Jr., and have been updated periodically. Members believe that the wearing of these garments serves as a symbolic reminder of eternal covenants they have made with God the Father and Jesus Christ. Outside of temples, including at weekly sacrament meetings and at general conferences, respectful clothing is traditionally worn, often with a white, button-down shirt, and a tie for the male members, females typically wear a dress or skirt, emphasizing "modesty" in appearance.

==== Temple robes and baptismal clothing ====
Special outer temple clothing (also called temple robes) is worn by Mormons to perform the endowment and sealing portions of their temple ceremonies. The clothing includes a robe that fits over one shoulder, a sash, an apron, a veil (for women), and a cap (for men). All of the clothing is white, including shoes and neckties, except for the apron, which is green. It is common for Latter-day Saints to be buried in their temple clothes. White clothes are worn by those undergoing and performing baptism.

== Islam ==
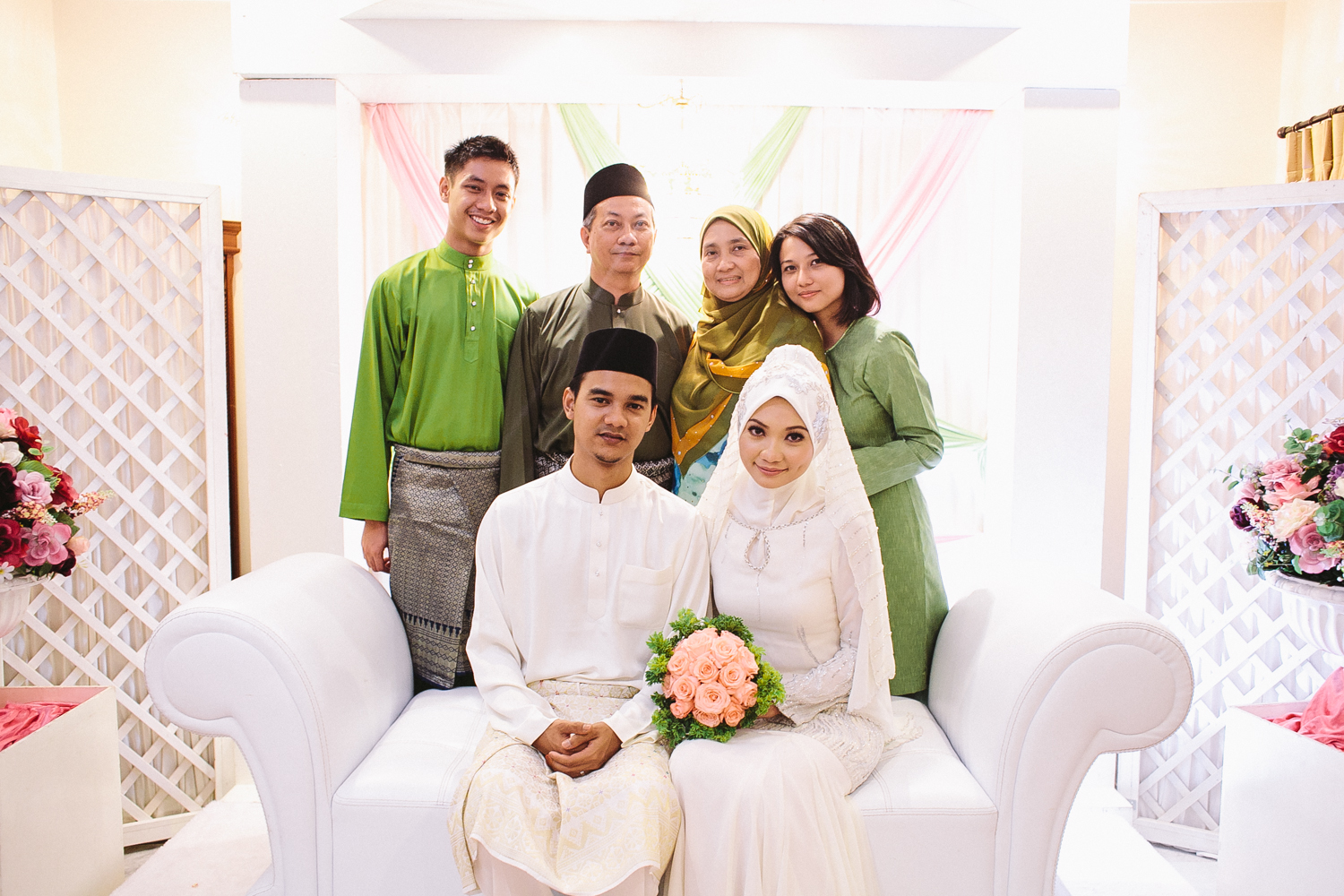
Islamic modest clothing worn at an Indonesian wedding ceremony

Dress in Islam varies from country to country. The Quranic sura An-Nur ("The Light") prescribes modesty in dress. Various hadiths (teachings of Muhammad) state further criteria for women's dress code and men's dress code in Islam.

The hijab is recommended for women in the Quran, which says: "O Prophet, tell your wives and your daughters and the women of the believers to bring down over themselves [part] of their outer garments. That is more suitable that they will be known and not be abused. And ever is Allah Forgiving and Merciful."

The hijab is commonly worn throughout the Islamic world, with many Muslim countries having adapted it to their culture and traditions. For example, there are Muslim countries like Turkey where only a headscarf is common; however, this does not mean that the niqab, burqa or khimar are not worn. In Saudi Arabia, the hijab, niqab, the khimar and the burqa are typical. In Afghanistan and parts of Pakistan, the burqa and the niqab are both common. In India, particularly in the state of Kashmir, Muslim women wear the hijab and the khimar. In Sudan, Indonesia and Malaysia, the hijab, the khimar and the jilbab are more common.

== Hinduism ==
Hindu men often don short coats known as angarkhas, while women typically wear long scarves or robes called saris. Women also have a decorative marking (bindi) on forehead, which resembles a red dot and is "traditionally believed to be venerating an energy center of the human body or representing 'the third eye'".

== Buddhism ==
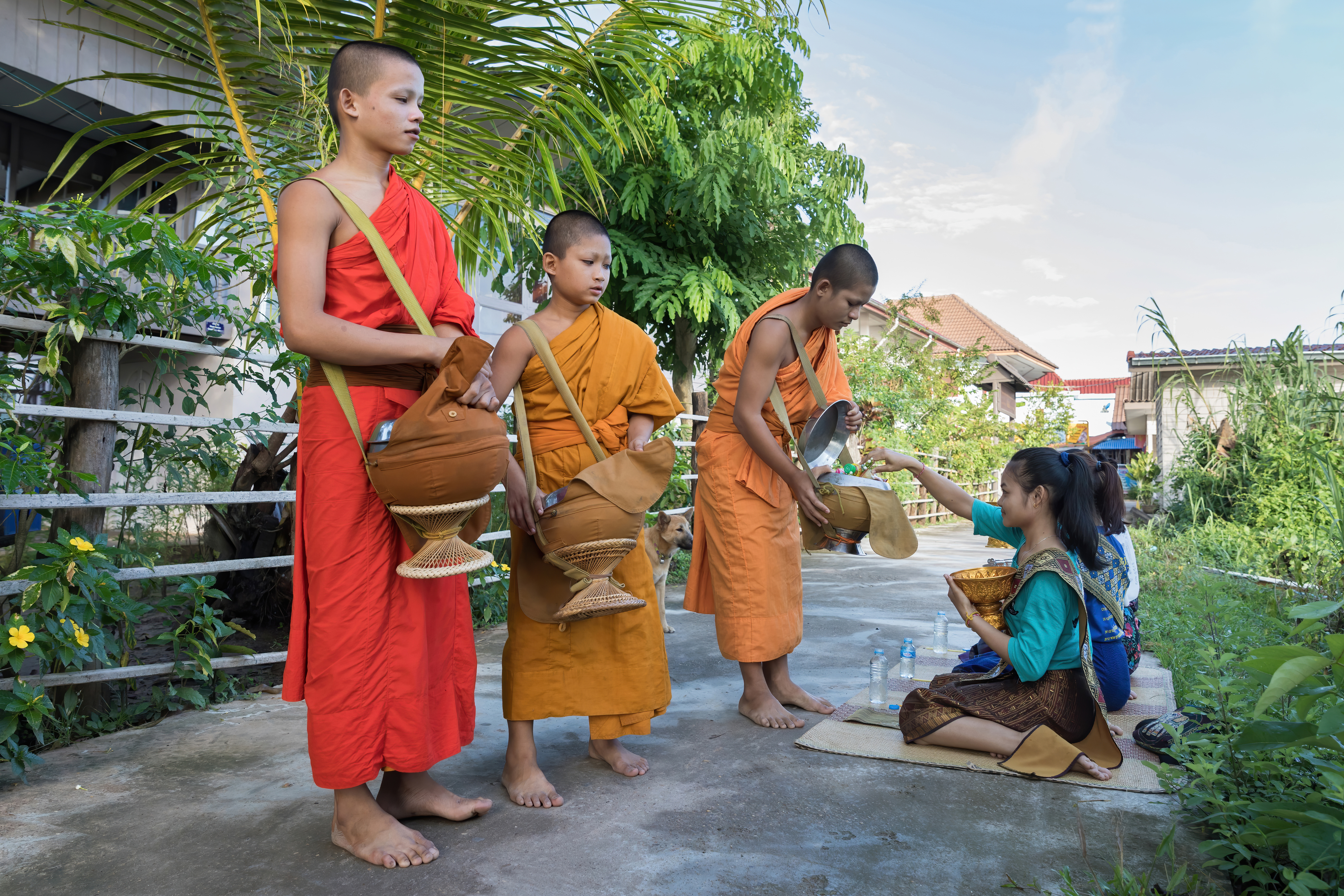
Buddhist alms in Don Det (Si Phan Don, Laos)

Ordained Buddhist bhikkus (monks) and bhikkunis (nuns) traditionally wear simple robes called kāṣāya, named after a brown or saffron dye used to give the fabric their distinctive non-primary colors. Originally, these robes were made of cast-off or donated material because monks lived ascetic lifestyles. The dyes were used to distinguish their common clothing from other people. In Sanskrit and Pali, these robes are also given the more general term cīvara, which references the robes without regard to color.

Bhikkus wear the "triple robe" (tricivara) comprises an inner garment or waistcloth (antaravasaka), an upper robe (uttarsanga) and outer robe (sanghati). Bhikkunis wear the "fivefold robe" with an additional vest and skirt. Sandals are allowed if they are simple and have one lining only, or they may have many linings if they are cast-off sandals.

Ordained Buddhists also keep their heads and faces shaved, often including eyebrows, as a symbol of the renunciation of worldly desires.

== Sikhism ==
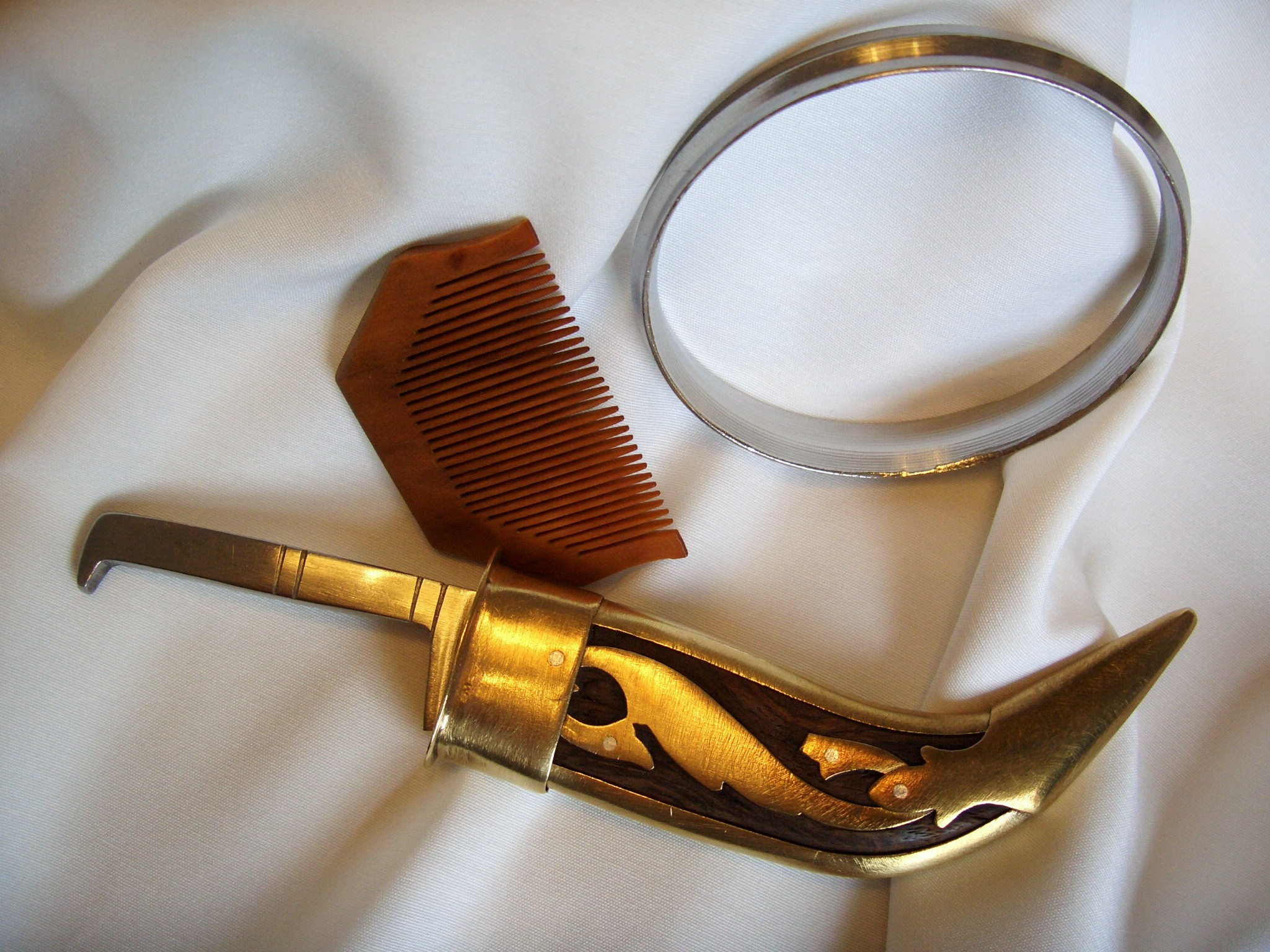
Sikh Articles of Faith

Baptized Khalsa Sikhs are mandated to wear the 5 Ks: kesh (unshorn hair), strapped kirpan (sword), kacchera (prescribed shorts), kangha (comb tucked in the tied up hair), karha (steel bracelet). He/she must not have on his/her person any token of any other faith. He/she must not have his/her head bare or be wearing a cap. He/she must not be wearing any ornaments piercing through any part of the body.

Hair is seen as sacred. Hair cutting, trimming, removing, shaving, plucking, threading, dyeing, or any other alteration from any body part is strictly forbidden.

In addition to this, every Sikh man is supposed to wear a turban, while it is optional for women. Piercing of the nose or ears for wearing ornaments is forbidden for Sikh men and women. It is not proper for a Sikh woman to wear veil or keep her face hidden by veil or cover.

== Interreligious ==
A Peace Mala is a symbolic bracelet used to promote the message of the Golden Rule of mutual respect recognised by many spiritual paths. It consists of 16 beads, forming a double rainbow, which represent Christianity, Buddhism, Sikhism, Islam, Judaism, Baháʼí, ISKCON, Zoroastrianism, Tribal and Native Religions, Jainism, Earth Religions, Taoism, Hinduism and Yungdrung Bön, with the central white bead representing the wearer and whatever path they may follow.

== In secular contexts ==
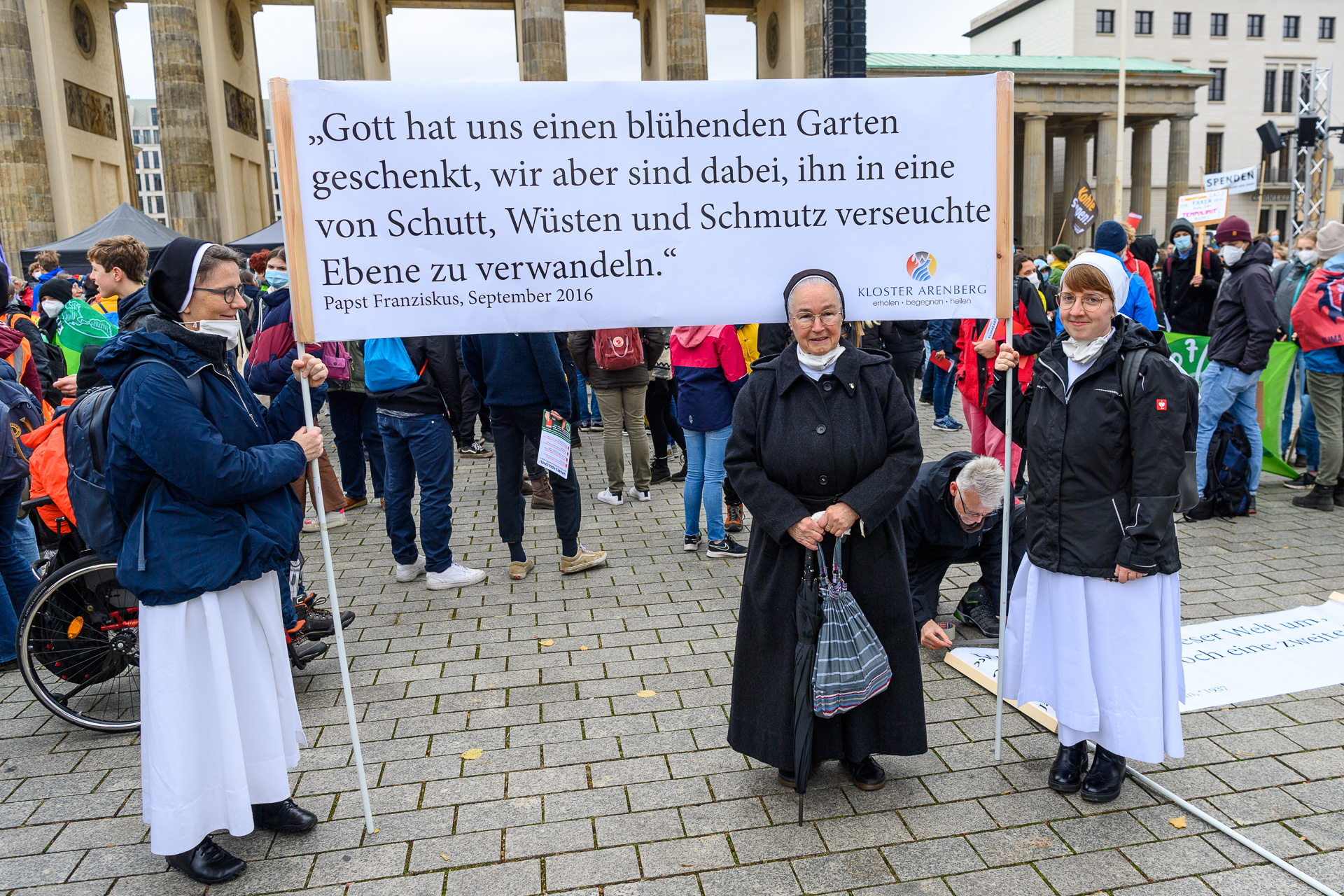
Nuns in Germany at a climate change protest

Religious clothing — especially that of religious clergy members whose religious clothing tends to be more distinctive — is sometimes worn in secular contexts, even when it is not expected or required. In such cases, clergy especially are often using their presence as a religious figure for a specific purpose. For example, during the George Floyd Protests of 2020, clergy and religious leaders of various faiths wore purple reflective vests as a symbol of their religious witness, sometimes in addition to other religious clothing.

There are numerous other instances where clergy have joined protests while in their respective faith's ceremonial dress. In many such cases, in addition to bearing witness, clergy have stated the following as part of their decision to join while in their ceremonial (or otherwise formal) religious garb:

- To deescalate situations between protestors and police, or protestors and counter-protestors.
- To act as legal observers.
- As a statement that their faith tradition, deities, etc., stands against the injustice the protest is also aimed at addressing.

In other contexts, some religious individuals will also don religious attire not solely for their own practice, but as a sign of solidarity with others who may be unable to practice their faith. For instance, some Muslim women in India have articulated that they choose to wear their hijab because other Muslim women in places such as France are legally barred from doing so.

== Gallery ==
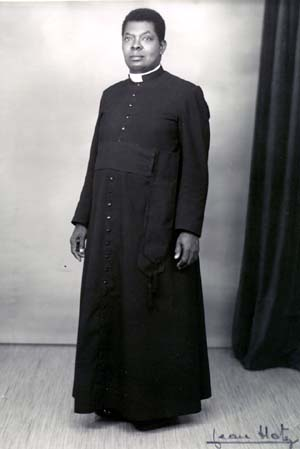
First native Catholic parish priest from the Belgian Congo, wearing a Roman cassock with the standard 18 buttons (Gazet van Antwerpen, 2 September 1906).

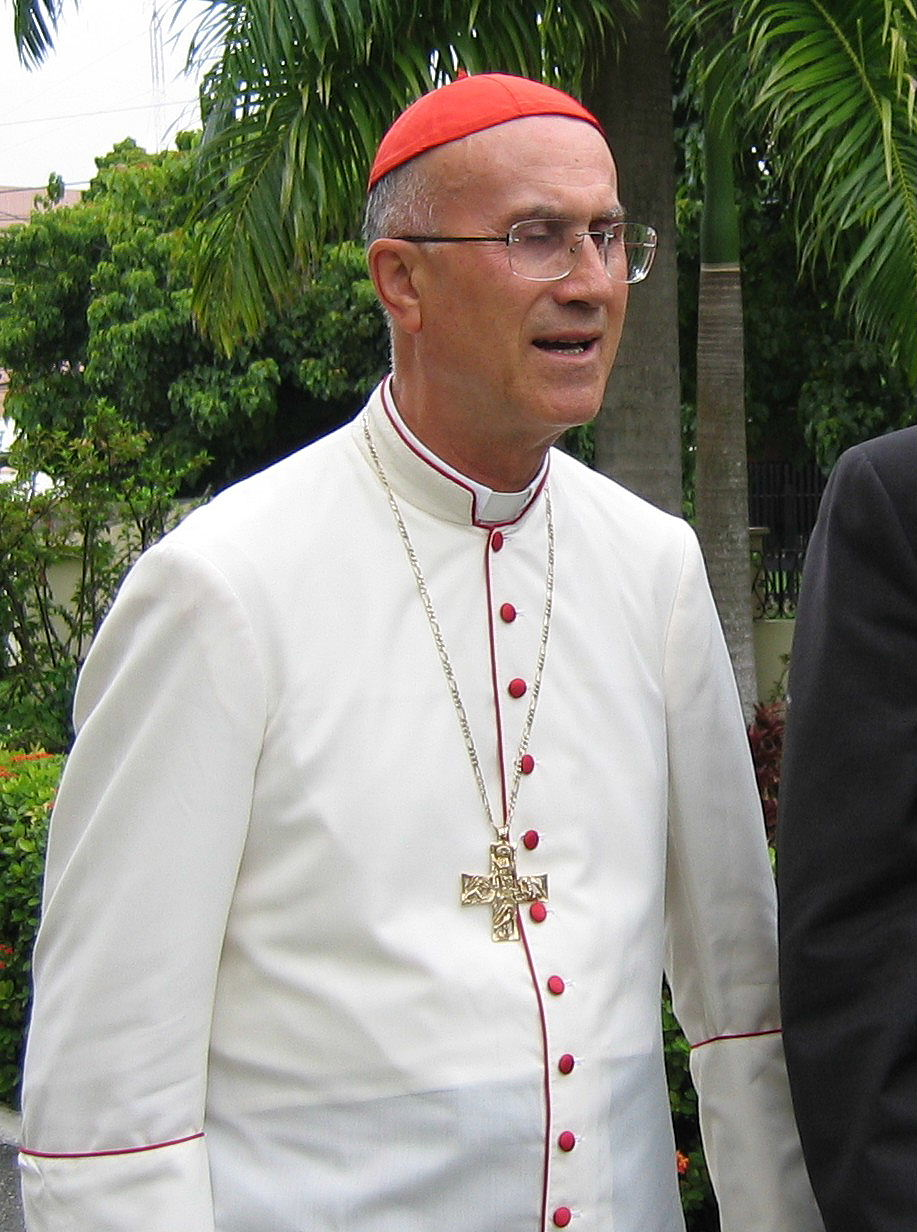
Catholic Cardinal Tarcisio Bertone wearing a tropical white cassock trimmed in cardinalatial scarlet in Santo Domingo, Dominican Republic (2006).

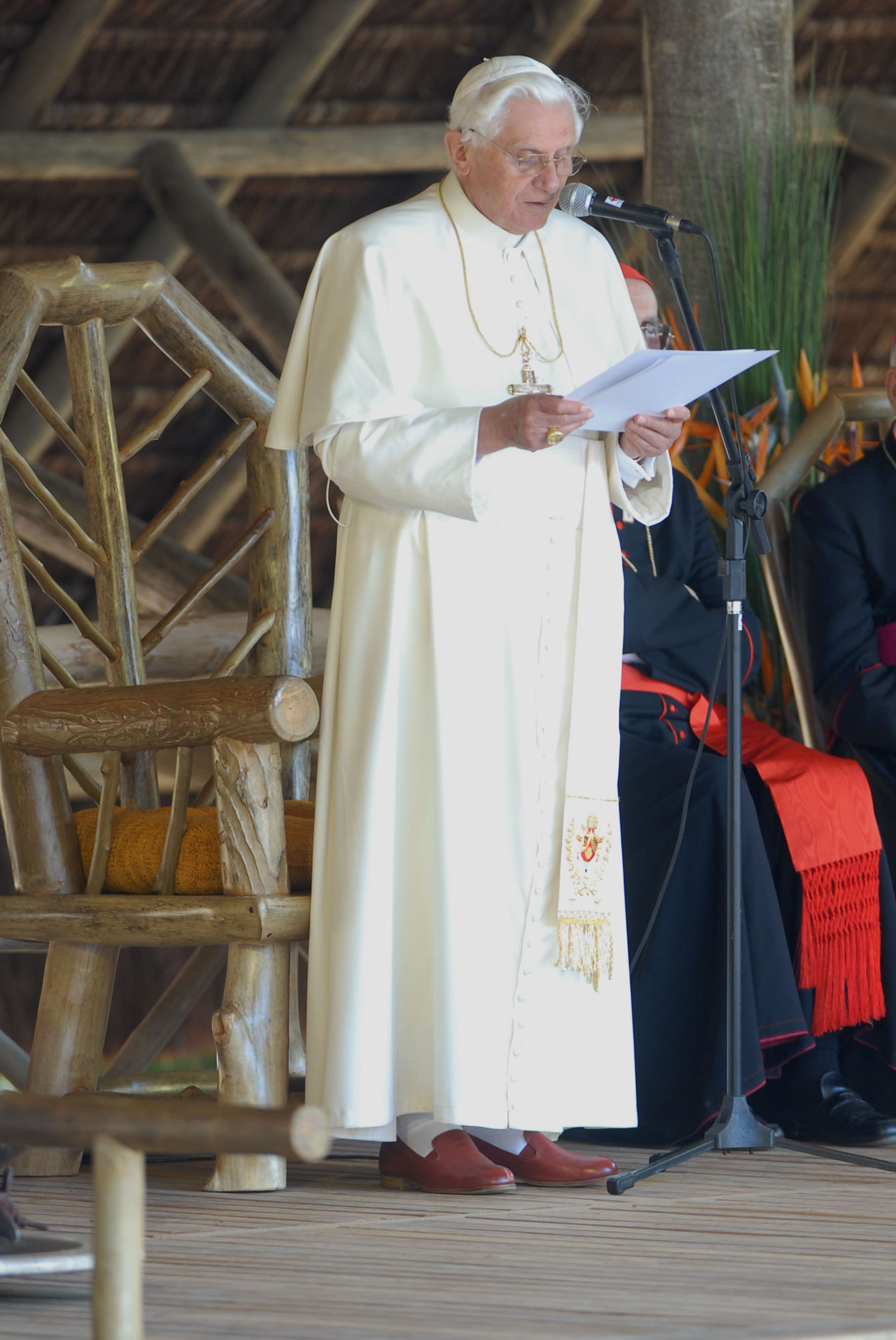
Pope Benedict XVI in white cassock (sometimes though unofficially called a simar) with pellegrina and fringed white fascia (2007).

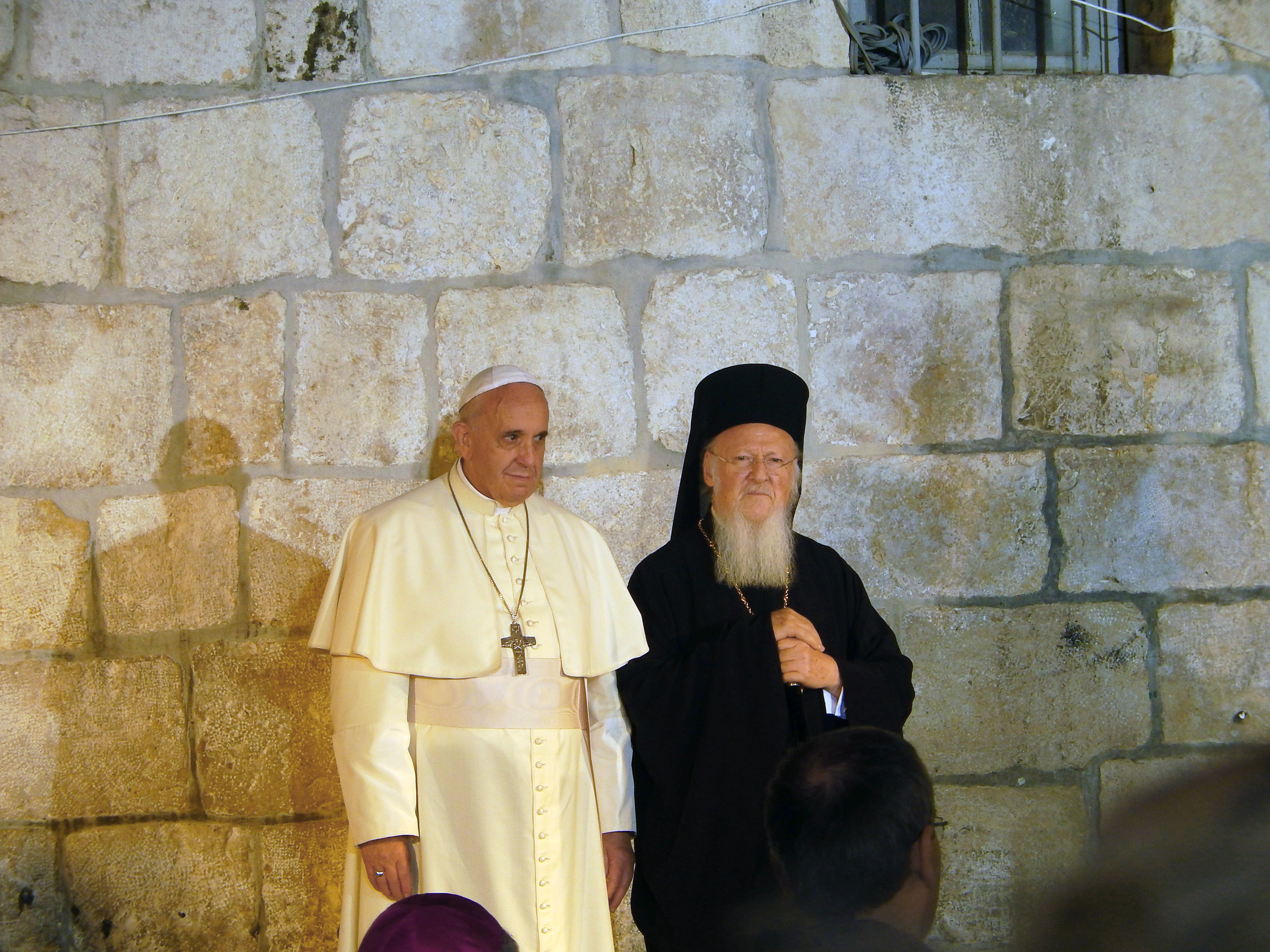
Pope Francis, and Patriarch Bartholomew I in the Church of the Holy Sepulchre, Jerusalem (2014).

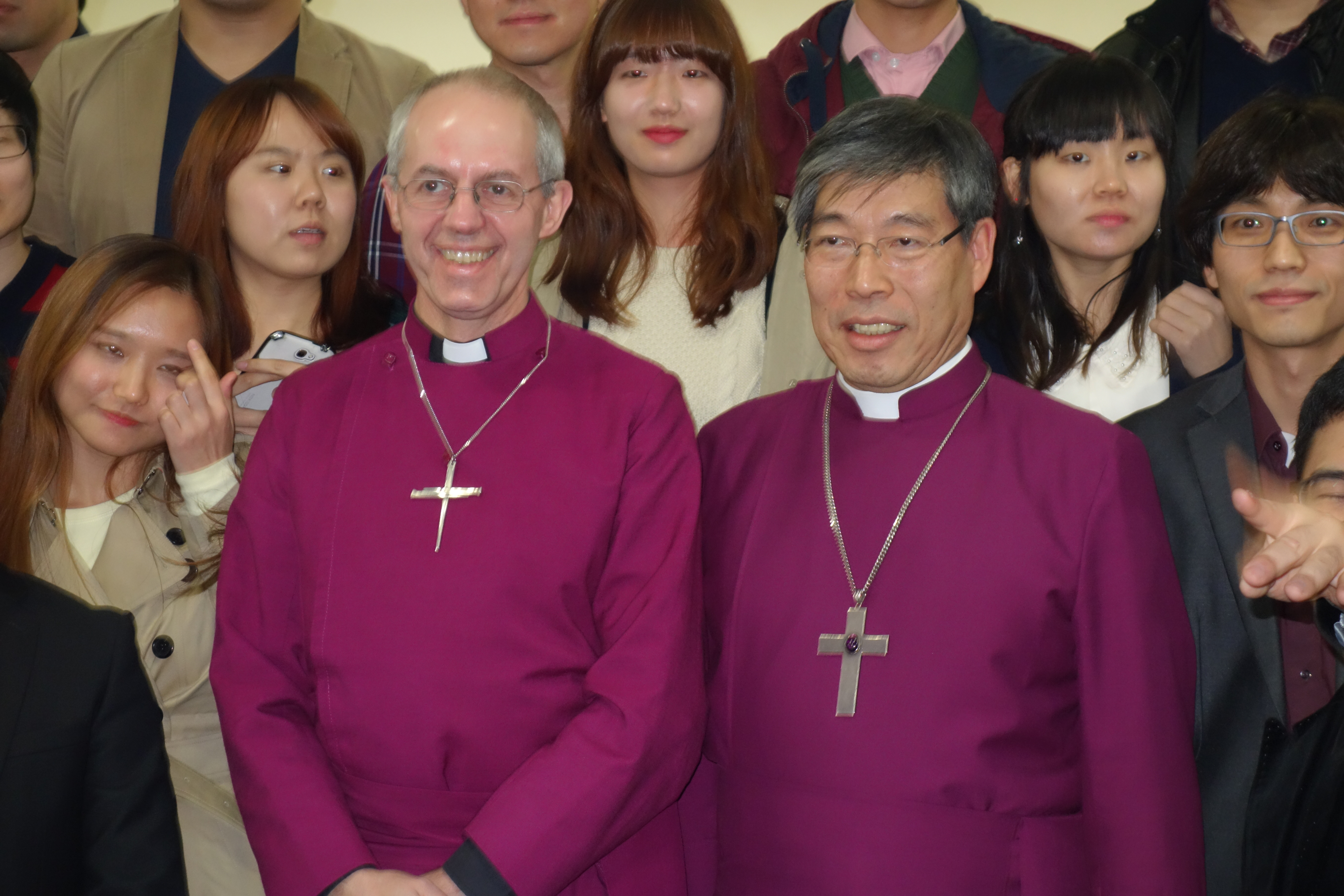
Justin Welby, Anglican Archbishop of Canterbury, and Kim Geun-Sang, Anglican Primate of the Anglican Church of Korea (2013).

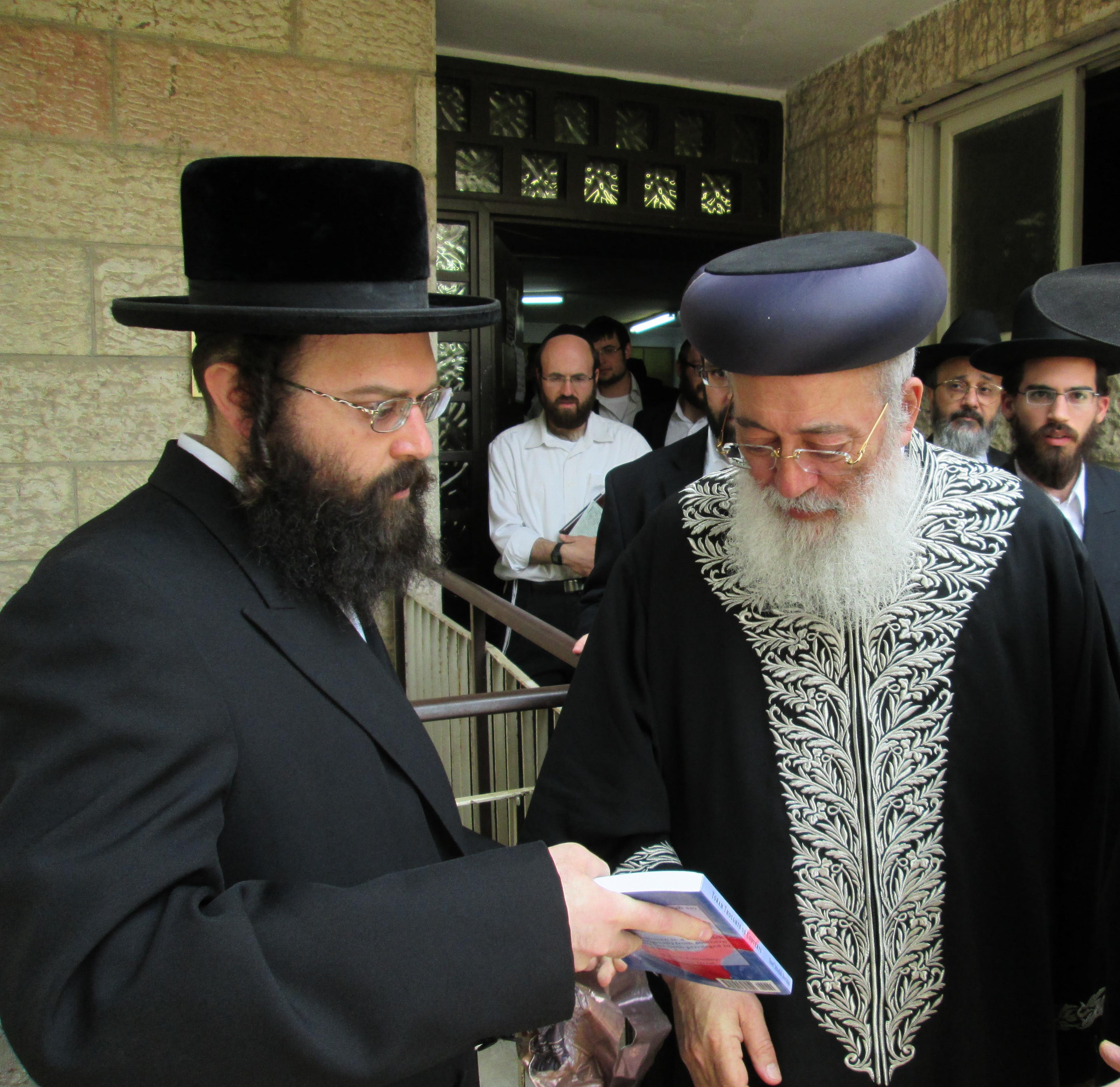
Chief Rabbi Shlomo Amar of Jerusalem, Israel (right) with Jewish scholar Joseph J. Sherman (left) (2014).

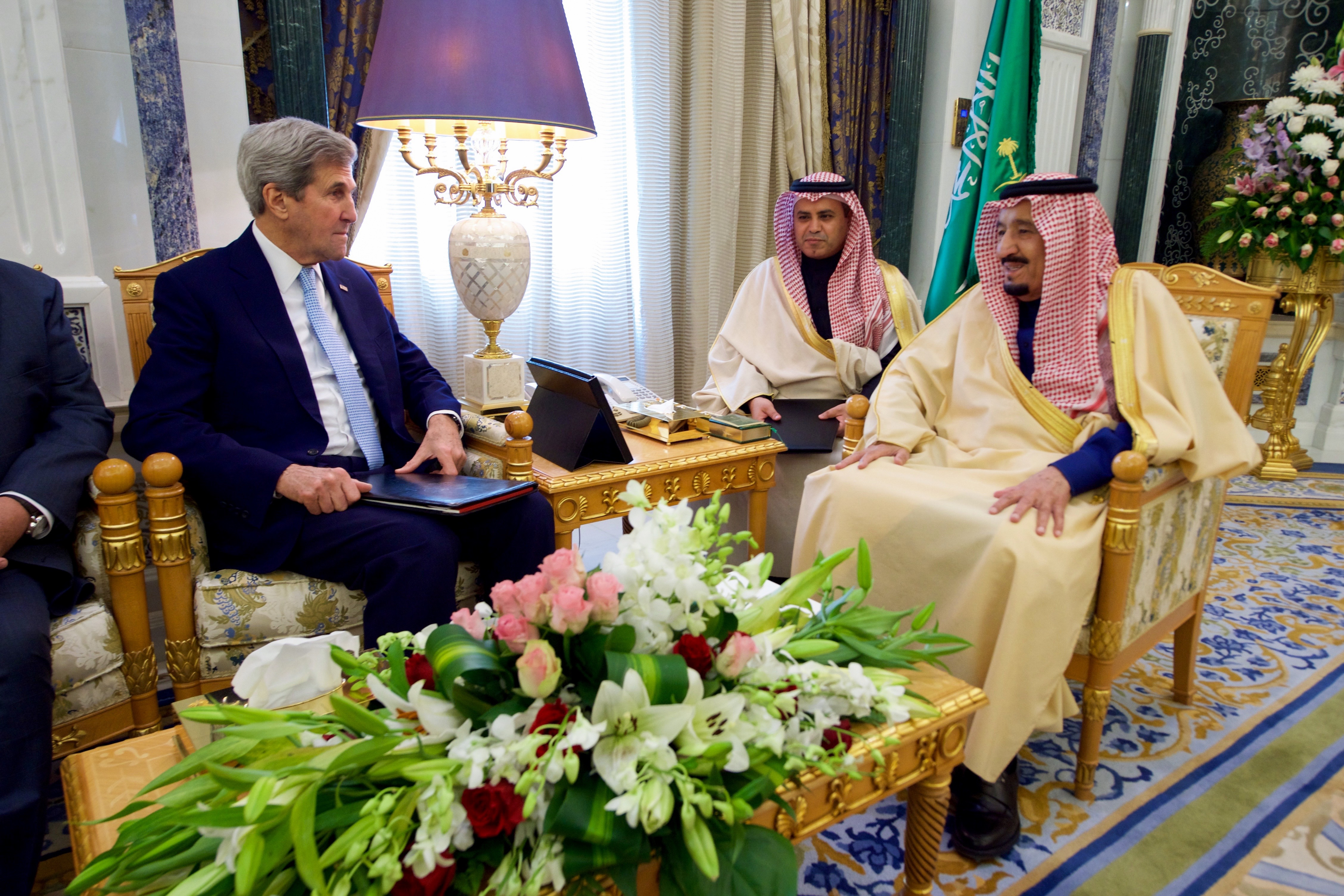
U.S. Secretary of State John Kerry sits with Saudi Arabia King Salman at the Royal Court in Riyadh, Saudi Arabia.

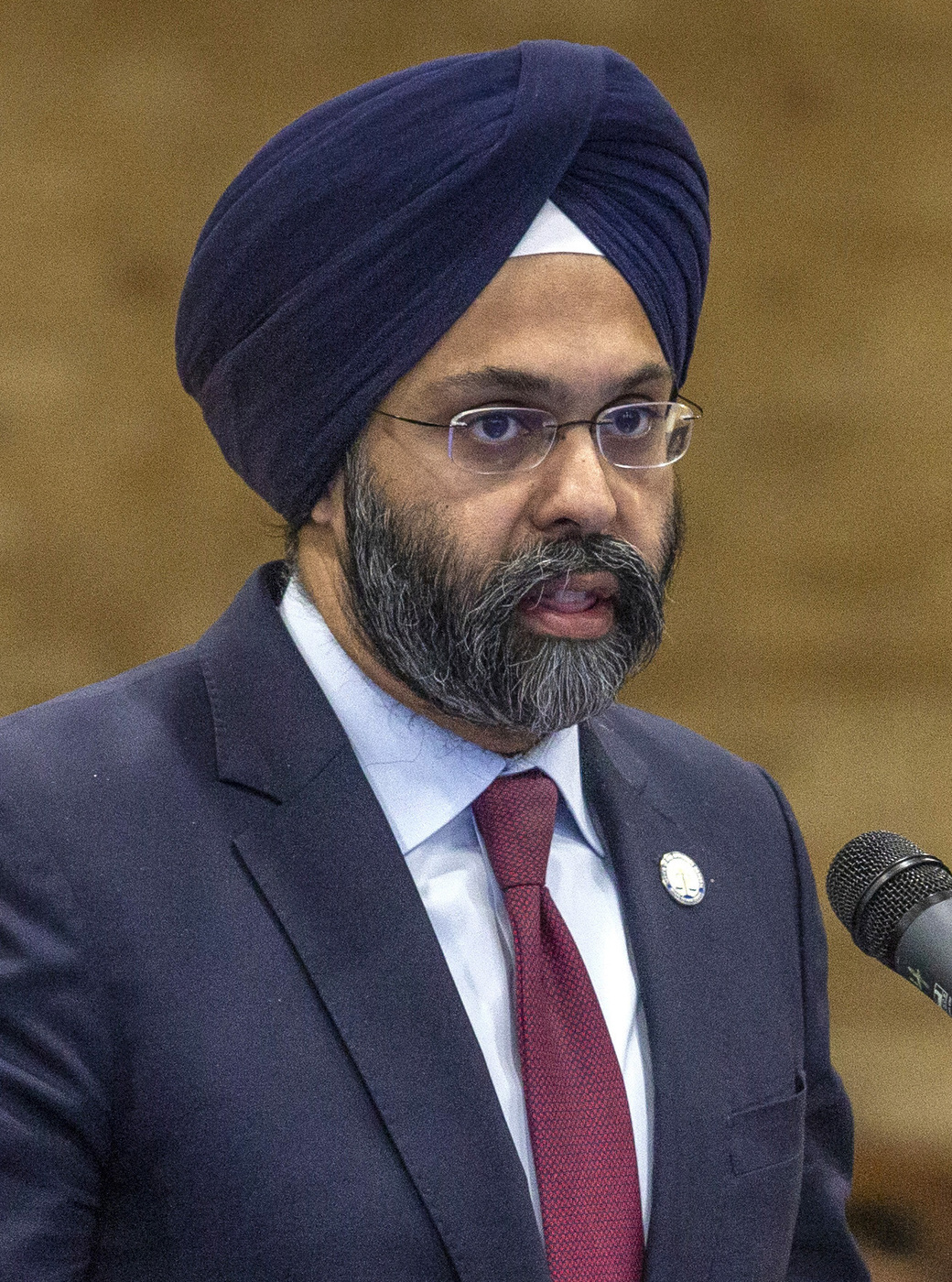
Sikh-American politician Gurbir Grewal wearing a turban

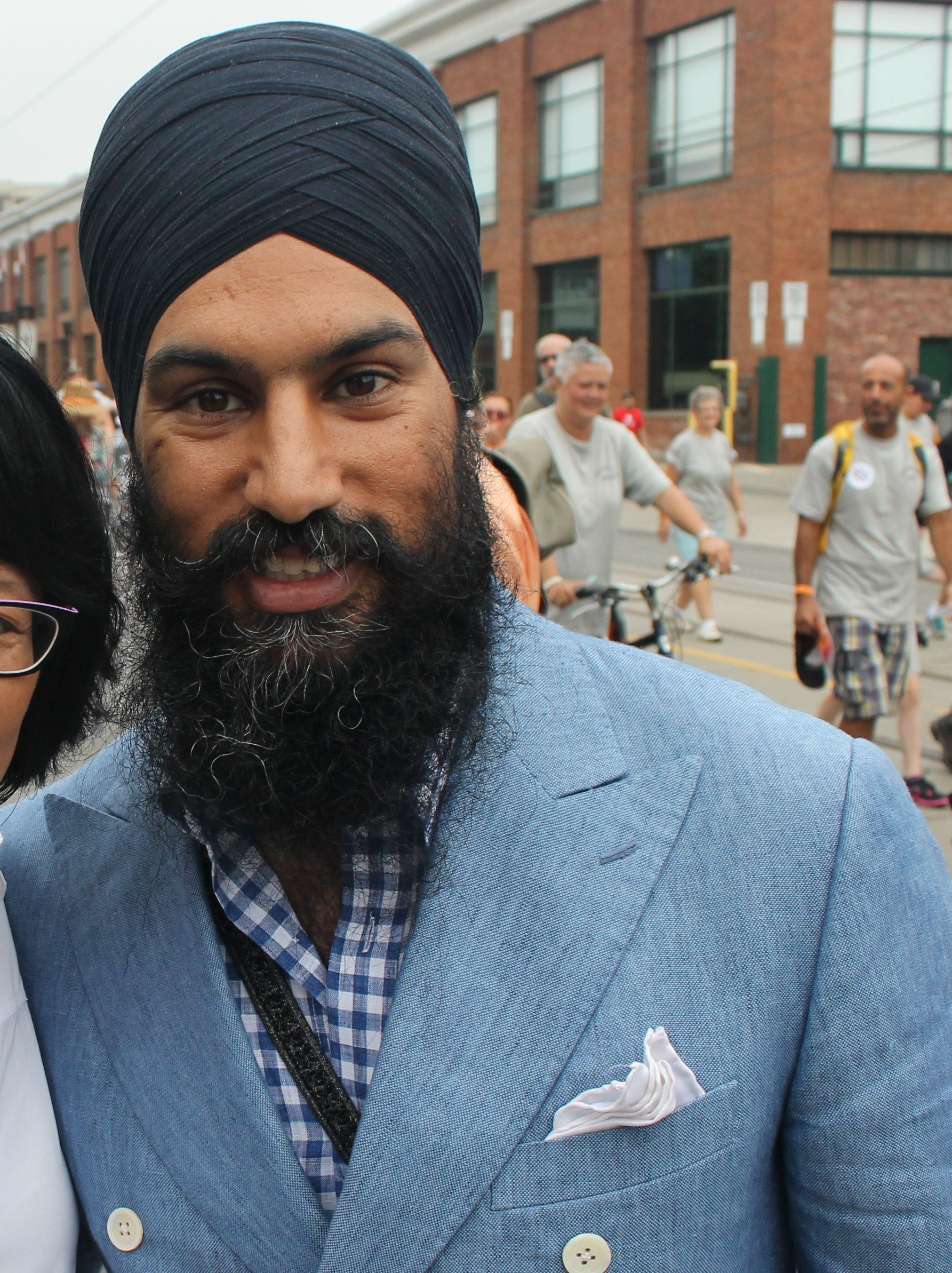
Sikh-Canadian politician Jagmeet Singh wearing a turban

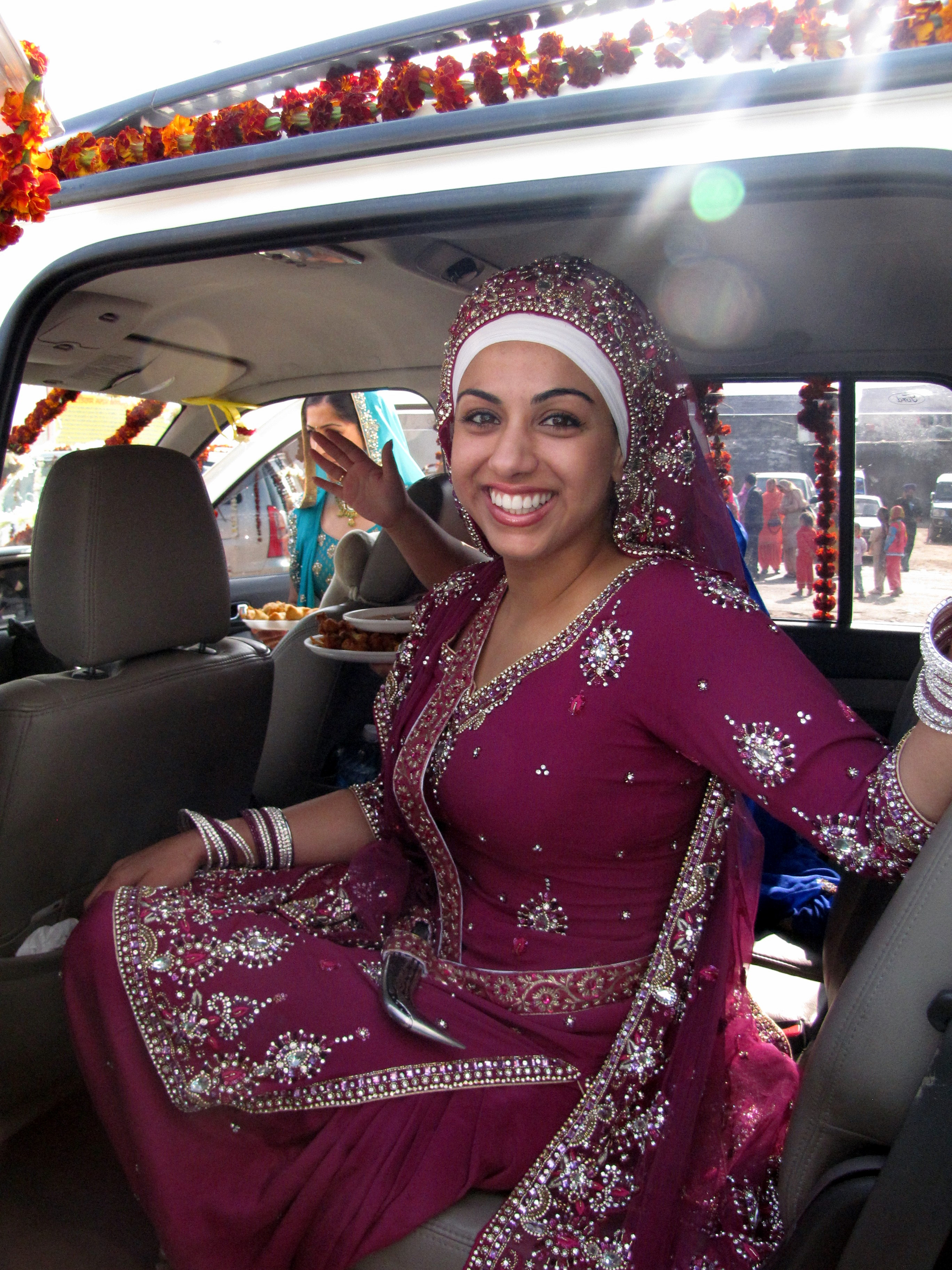
Sikh woman with turban

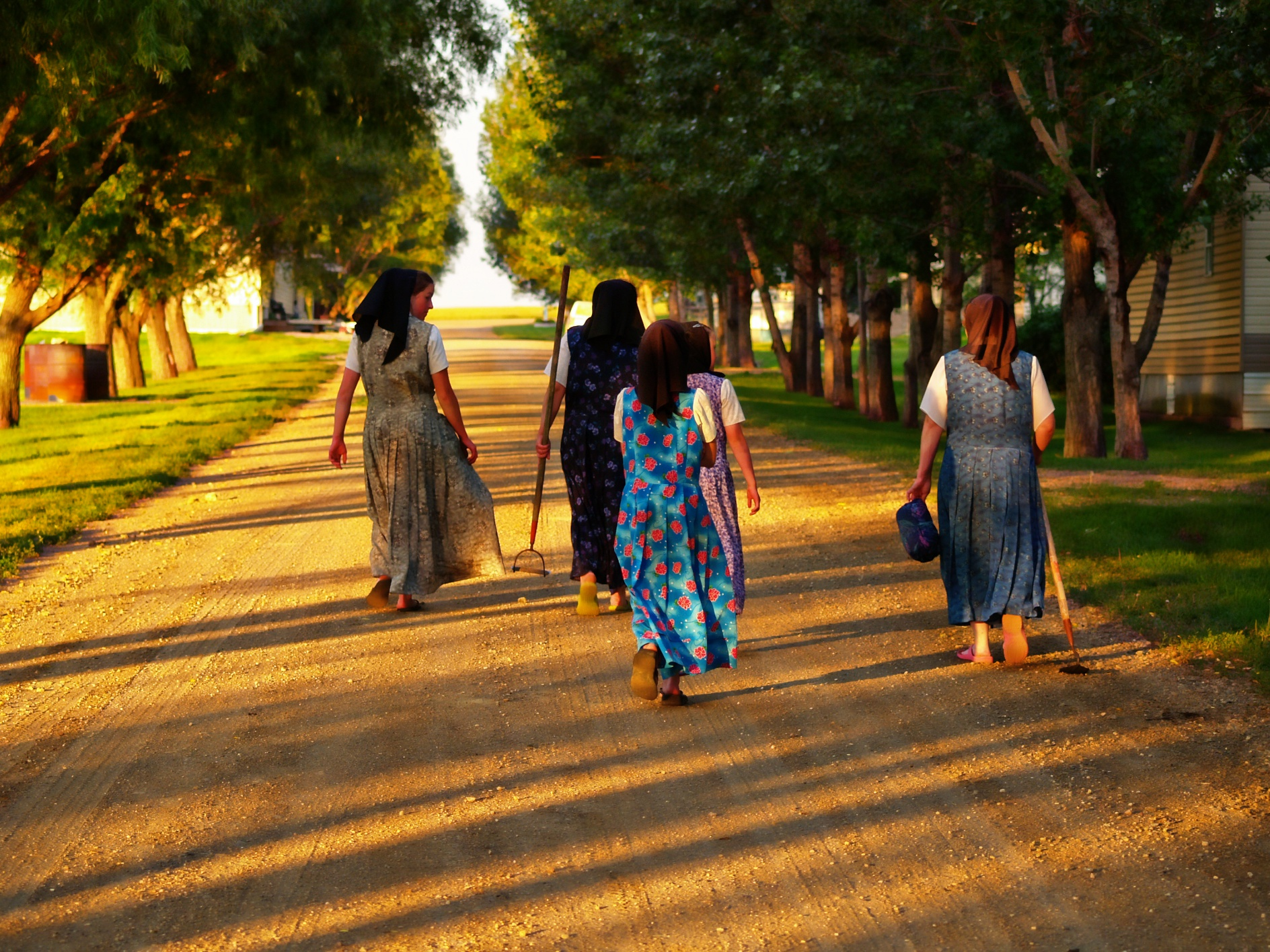
Women who belong to the Hutterite Church, an Anabapist Christian denomination, wear their headcovering daily and only remove it when sleeping.

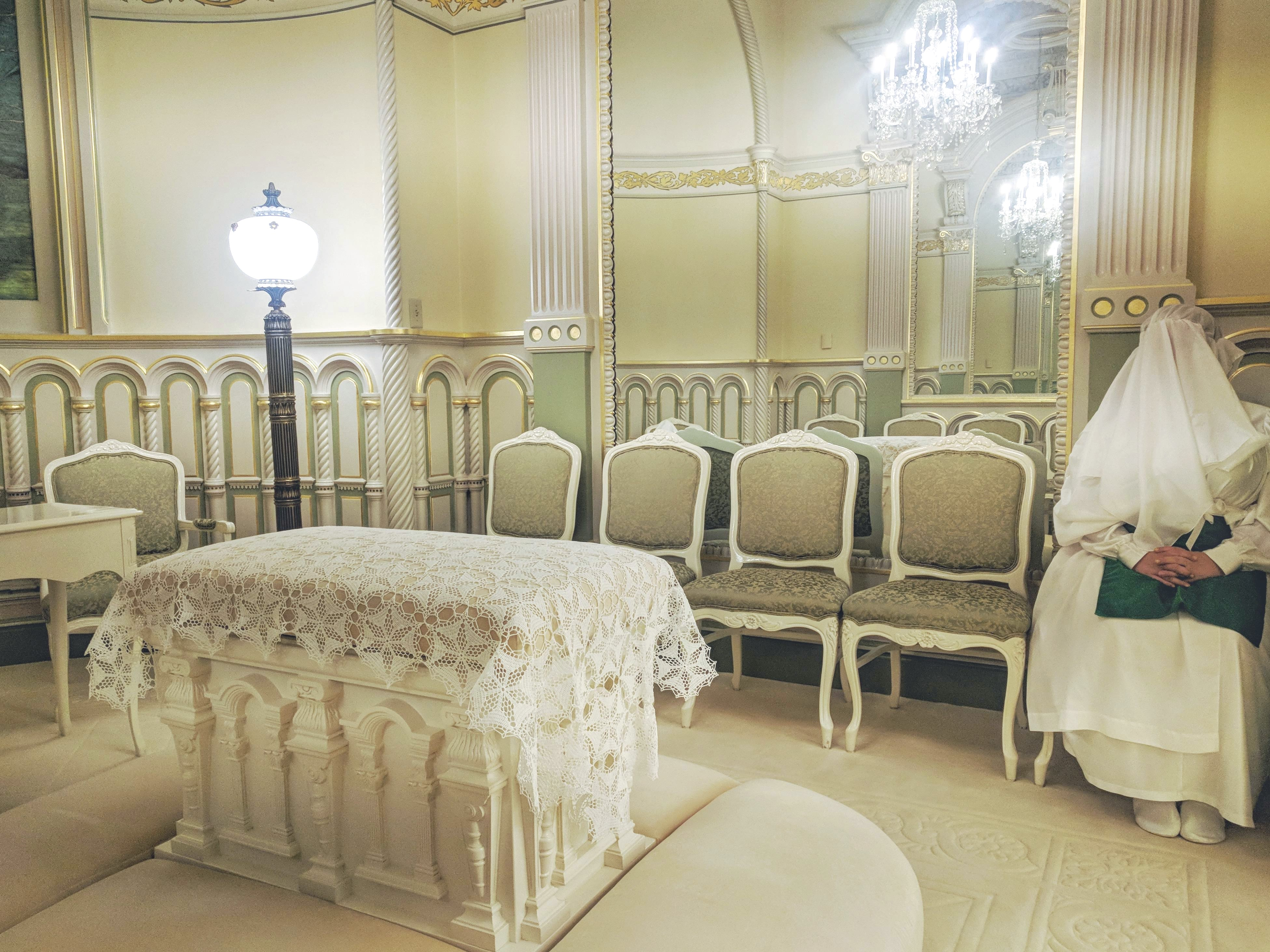
A Mormon woman in white and green ceremonial temple garb, used during the endowment ceremony

== See also ==
- Clerical clothing (Christian)
- Clothing#Religion
- Dastar
- Hijab
- Jewellery
- Religion
- Religious habit
- Tonsure
- Right to clothing
