= Fashion law =

Legal issues that impact fashion

Fashion law concerns legal issues that impact the fashion industry. Fundamental issues in fashion law include intellectual property, business, and finance, with subcategories ranging from employment and labor law to real estate, international trade, and government regulation. Fashion law also includes related areas such as textile production, modeling, media, the cosmetics and perfume industries, questions of safety and sustainability, dress codes and religious apparel, consumer culture, privacy and wearable tech, and civil rights. Clothing laws vary by country.

== History ==
Fashion has long been subject to legal regulation, from sumptuary laws that limit who can wear certain garments to trade restrictions and varying degrees of intellectual property protection. However, fashion law was not conceived as a distinct legal field until the mid- to late-2000s.

In May 2004, a group of French lawyers led by Annabelle Gauberti published a supplement entitled "Droit du luxe" (which translates to either "law of luxury goods" or "luxury law") in the French legal magazine Revue Lamy Droit des Affaires. This supplement explored specific legal and tax issues at stake in the fashion and luxury goods sectors. It was one of the earliest analyses of the interactions between the legal field and the fashion and luxury goods industries.

Susan Scafidi offered the first course in fashion law at Fordham Law School in 2006. At the same time, fashion law courses for designers were developed by Guillermo Jimenez at the Fashion Institute of Technology and Deborah McNamara at Parsons School of Design. In 2008, Scafidi wrote that fashion law was only then starting to be recognized as a distinct area of law. Scafidi founded the Fashion Law Institute and serves as its academic director.

In 2010, the first academic centre dedicated to fashion law, the Fashion Law Institute, launched with the support of Diane von Furstenberg and the Council of Fashion Designers of America. Since then, several other institutions worldwide have offered courses or programs in fashion law. These include the University of Milan, the University of Insubria, the Instituto Brasileiro de Negócios e Direito da Moda, University at Buffalo Law School, Benjamin N. Cardozo School of Law, New York Law School, New York University, the Fashion Law Project at Loyola Law School, the Moda Hukuku Enstitusu in Turkey, the annual Fashion Law Week at Howard University, and McGill University Faculty of Law.

In 2010, designer-turned-lawyer Brittany Rawlings led the first Fashion Law practice group dedicated to issues arising throughout the life of a fashion business. The New York City Bar Association has had a dedicated Fashion Law Committee since January 2011, and the New York County Lawyers Association has had a Fashion Law Subcommittee since September 2011.

== Areas of fashion law ==
=== Intellectual property ===
Intellectual property protection has been a substantial legal concern in fashion since the emergence of fashion brands in the 19th century. It has been the subject of congressional debate in the US, multiple academic articles, the first fashion law blog, and a major exhibit at the Fashion Institute of Technology Museum in New York.

Key issues include the scope of copyright protection, trademark infringement and counterfeit goods, utility patents, particularly in connection with advances in technology, the use of design patents as an alternative or supplement to copyright protection, and comparative international standards.

A related issue has been cultural appropriation, such as the use of Native American or religious designs by commercial fashion brands.

=== Financing and corporate structures ===
Fashion law encompasses issues pertinent to starting and funding a fashion business, such as the widespread use of factoring, the influx of private equity investment, and initial public offerings by major fashion brands.

=== Manufacturing ===
Legal issues in the production of clothing and accessories include worker safety and other labor practices, garment district zoning, and source indication.

=== Marketing ===
Legal issues addressed in connection with marketing include labelling requirements, licensing, and deceptive advertising.

=== Retail ===
Legal issues in the retail environment include consumer data privacy and the security of credit card information, discrimination based on racial profiling, and real-estate leasing and ownership.

=== Ethics, sustainability, and economic development ===
Concerns regarding sustainability, and economic development have had a substantial impact on the industry, affecting both the legal framework and self-regulation initiatives.

Important issues have included organic certification, greenwashing, supply-chain monitoring and certification standards (including the Higg Index and SA8000 certification), the regulation of digitally altered images, fair trade fashion, and the impact of philanthropic initiatives and clothing donation programs.

In 2024, Gucci faced a lawsuit over how it sources its exotic animal skin products. The claim was that they were not sourcing them ethically. PETA (People for the Ethical Treatment of Animals) investigated and found that the animals were brutally abused in the process of obtaining their skin for products.

=== International trade ===
Fashion law also addresses other matters connected to international business transactions, including gray market goods, import and export quotas, transfer pricing taxation, and customs duties.

=== Modelling law ===
The legal status of models has become a prominent issue in fashion law, as exemplified by the regulation of models' weight in places such as Madrid, Milan, and Israel, New York's enactment of a statute giving underage models protection under the state's child labor law, antitrust enforcement in relation to model pay-rates, and efforts to curb fashion-related human trafficking.
