= Hofesh =

Israeli organization

- Hofesh - Freedom from Religion
- Formation: 1987
- Purpose: Advocating separation of religion and state in Israel and objecting to religious coercion
- Headquarters: Tel Aviv, Israel
- Location: Israel
- Affiliations: Atheist Alliance International
- Website: Official website (in Hebrew); Official website (in English)

Hofesh (Hebrew: חופש, lit. "freedom"), officially Hofesh - Freedom from Religion (Hebrew: חופש – עמותה לחופש מדת) is an Israeli organization advocating separation of religion and state and stopping the religious coercion in Israel, objecting to and going against activities whose goal is to persuade secular or moderately religious Jews to adopt a more religiously observant lifestyle. The organization is an affiliate of Atheist Alliance International.

== Goals ==
The organization's goals are:

- To act and support all possible ways within the law for separation of religion and state and against any manifestation of ultra-Orthodox takeover and religious coercion in all its forms, including preaching Haredization.
- To act in any way to increase the awareness of the Jewish-secular identity of the liberated public in Israel, to cooperate with public bodies, organizations, cultural institutions and websites in order to expand the basis of the liberated, liberal, pluralistic and secular worldview of Israeli society.
- To serve as framework and address for all those affected by the acts of Haredization through pressure toward "repentance" and religious coercion, to guide and assist families affected by the preaching of orthodoxy.

== History ==
A newspaper ad that actually started off the establishment of the organization. It was published by parents of a teen "returning to religion", who became the founders of the organization.

In Israel of the 1980s, there was an activity of ultra-Orthodox and religious associations, and the phenomenon of "repentance" among the secular public increased. At the end of 1985, a number of parents of a teen "returning in repentance", i.e. adopting an observant (frum) lifestyle, began to organize as a group and locate other people like them. In May 1986, the group established an association called "Victims of Repentance" (Hebrew: נפגעי החזרה בתשובה, Nifga'ey HaHazara BiTshuva), whose goals were:

- Publicly reveal the methods of the repentance advocators.
- Investigate the phenomenon of repentance and its scope.
- Stimulate public opinion in the country and expose it to the dangers lurking (in the opinion of the association) to the individual, family, society and the entire country from the process of repentance.
- Act with the state authorities, its institutions and leaders, draw their attention to the phenomenon, and prevent further repentance by stopping the flow of funds to the institutions engaged in this activity.

According to the association's website, the association succeeded in "outlawing missionary work in schools and IDF bases". In 1987, the association changed its name to "ע.ל.ה", a Hebrew acronym for "Association for the Prevention of the Haredi Takeover" (Hebrew: עמותה למניעת ההשתלטות החרדית), and started dealing with issues other than repentance, such as the prevention of religious coercion and the prevention of the establishment of a Halachic state in Israel.

In 1998, the association merged with the Hofesh website, and changed its name to "ע.ל.ה – חופש". Since then, the association's activity has been conducted simultaneously online and offline. The Hofesh website was established in November 1997 and is operated by volunteers.

In September 2004, a decision was made to change the association name to "Hofesh - Freedom from Religion" (Hebrew: חופש - עמותה לחופש מדת).

In July 2016, the association, along with a number of other petitioners, filed a petition with the Supreme Court, demanding the Minister of Transportation, Israel Katz, and the Ministry of Transportation consider operating public transportation on Shabbat, in light of their refusal to do so.

The organization is an affiliate of Atheist Alliance International.

The organization is objectionable among the religious Zionist and Haredi public.

== See also ==
- Religion in Israel
