= Frum =

Yiddish word for a devout Jew

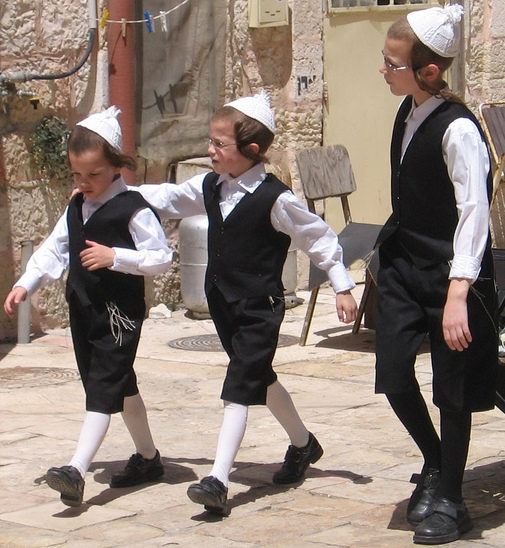
Frum Breslov boys from Mea Shearim, Jerusalem, 2011

Frum (Yiddish: פֿרום, lit. 'religious', 'pious') is a word that describes Jewish religious devotion.

The term connotes the observance of Jewish religious law in a way that often exceeds its bare requirements. This not only includes the careful study of Torah, daily prayers, observing Shabbat, kashrut, and the rules of tzniut, and performing deeds of loving-kindness, but also many more customs and khumrot (prohibitions or obligations in Jewish life that exceed the requirements of Halakha).

The term frum contrasts with frei (Yiddish: פֿרײַ, romanized: fray, lit. 'free'), which describes Jews who do not practice Orthodox observance.

== Meaning ==
Frum can be used in a negative sense for 'hypocritically pious', 'holier-than-thou', 'sanctimonious'; or in a positive sense for 'pious', 'devout', 'God-fearing', and 'upright'. The phrase frum and ehrlich captures the positive connotations of these words, to mean roughly 'upright' or 'righteous' (see tzadik).

The question "is s/he frum?" asks whether the person is religious.

== Derived terms ==
In Yinglish, frummer is used both as a noun for 'one who is frum' and as a comparative adjective, i.e. 'more frum'. The prescribed Yiddish comparative form of the adjective is, in fact, frimer. Frumkeit describes the lifestyle of those who are frum.

Frummer can also have a negative connotation, similar to chasid shoteh ('pious idiot'), which is how the Talmud (Sotah 21B) describes a man who sees a woman drowning but refuses to save her, saying: "It is not proper to look at her, and rescue her." A frummer in that sense is a person displaying a disproportionate emphasis on technical aspects of religion of one's daily life in a manner which actually violates the halakha in a specific case. (See Pikuach nefesh.) Another term with this meaning is frummie.

A person who is frum from birth (FFB) was born into a frum household and has remained observant. This contrasts with a baal teshuva (BT), which literally means 'master of return' and refers to a Jew who has become frum after a period or lifetime of following a non-Orthodox lifestyle. Someone who leaves the frum lifestyle would be referred to as off the derech (OTD), which literally means 'off the path.'

The Frumba exercise program originated in Chicago as a derivation of the dance-based fitness program Zumba. Frumba classes are offered exclusively to women who observe frum forms of tzniut modesty laws, featuring music with less explicit lyrics.

== Mode of dress ==
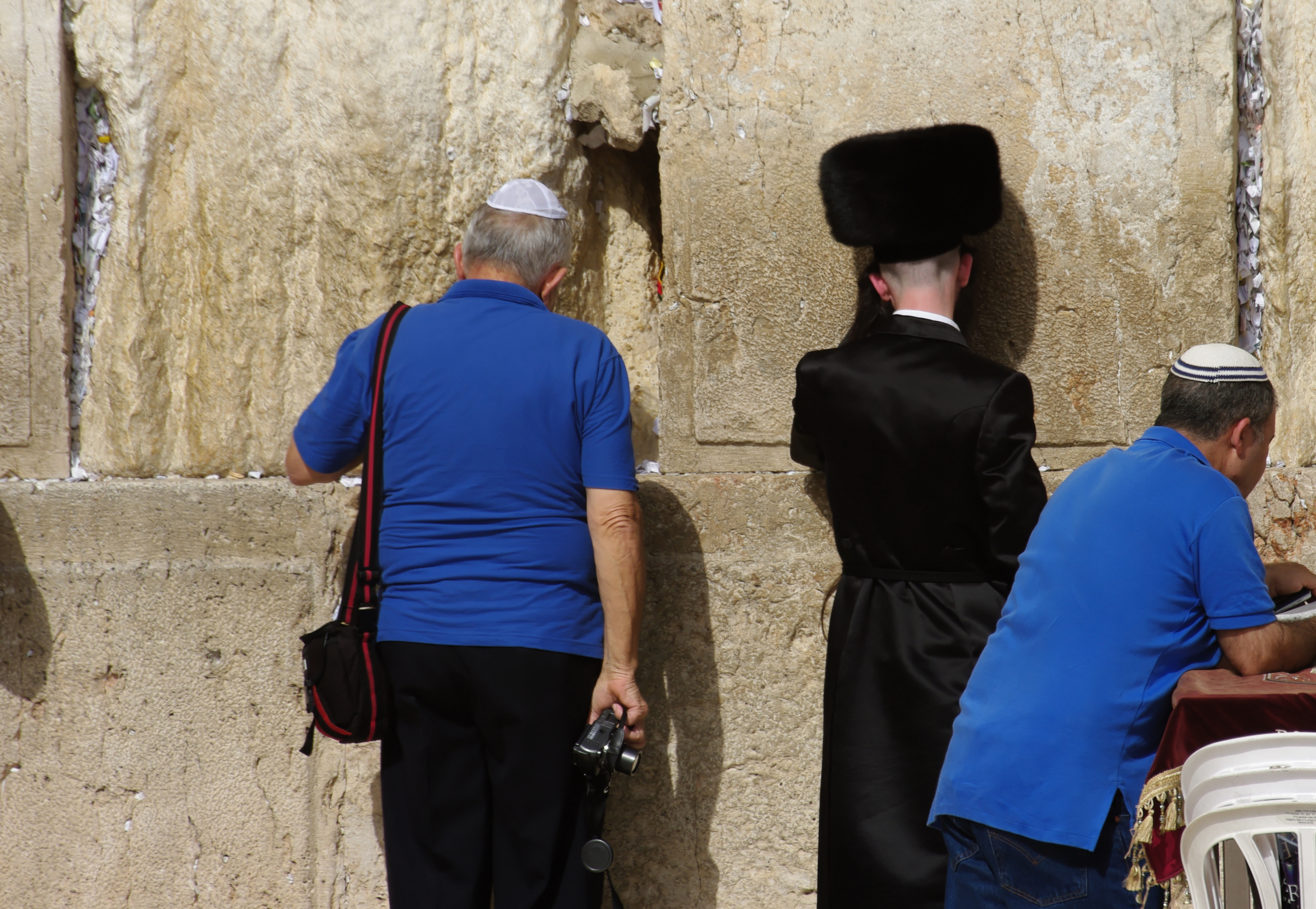
Three men with customary head coverings praying at the kotel, one in the middle wearing an additional spodik hat

Frum Jews are expected to dress in gender-specific modest clothing adherent to standards outlined by Jewish religious law. Women dress in loose skirts and dresses that cover their arms and legs. When married, they cover their heads with scarves and wigs. Jewish men wear fringed undershirts known as tallitot katan, and head coverings often in the style of kippot. Although applicable to both sexes, particular emphasis is often placed upon the dressing guidelines of women.

In addition to the tzniut style of dress, many frum Jews are identifiable by their traditional clothing. Rekels, shtreimels, and other distinct Ashkenazi Jewish garb have become mainstream religious clothing across ethnic divisions.
