= Susan Scafidi =

American lawyer and legal scholar

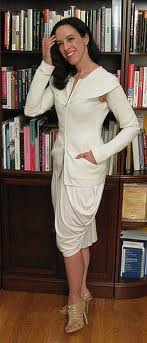
- Education: Duke University; Yale Law School
- Occupations: President, Fashion Law Institute; Professor, Fordham University School of Law
- Website: CounterfeitChic.com

Susan Scafidi is an American lawyer, legal scholar, advocate, nonprofit executive, and commentator. The first professor to offer a formal course on fashion law at a U.S. law school, she is the founder and president of the Fashion Law Institute, a nonprofit organization located at the Fordham University School of Law in New York City.

== Education and academic career ==
A native of Washington D.C., Scafidi received her B.A. from Duke University and J.D. from Yale Law School. She also did graduate work in history at the University of California-Berkeley and the University of Chicago.

After graduation from Yale, she clerked for Morris S. Arnold of the United States Court of Appeals for the Eighth Circuit

Scafidi's first law teaching position was at the University of Chicago. She subsequently joined the faculties at the St. Louis University School of Law and the Dedman School of Law at Southern Methodist University, where she received tenure. Prior to becoming a law professor at Fordham University School of Law, she also taught in the law schools at Brooklyn Law School, Georgetown and Yale.

== Fashion law ==
Scafidi is credited with being the "pioneer," "innovator" and "senior stateswoman" of fashion law as a distinct legal field.

In 2005, Scafidi launched CounterfeitChic.com. In addition to discussing examples of originality and copying in fashion, Scafidi used the site to call for a cultural analysis of fashion design protection. Scafidi's work in Counterfeit Chic has been cited as the inspiration for subsequent fashion law sites. The American Bar Association has recognized Counterfeit Chic as a top 100 law blog, and Counterfeit Chic has also received attention in multiple media outlets, including the New York Times, ABC News, and The Tyra Banks Show.

Scafidi was the first law professor to advocate for recognizing fashion law as a distinct legal field. Besides writing and speaking on the subject, she offered the first course on fashion law.

=== Fashion Law Institute ===
In 2010, with the support of Diane von Furstenberg and the Council of Fashion Designers of America, Scafidi founded the Fashion Law Institute, the world's first academic center dedicated to legal and business issues pertaining to the fashion industry. In 2015, Diane von Furstenberg and Scafidi announced the launch of the world's first master's degrees in fashion law: a Master of Laws for attorneys and a Master of Science in Law for designers, executives, and other non-attorney members of the fashion community.

=== Advocacy for fashion design protection ===
Scafidi has been a leading proponent for the enactment of intellectual property protection for fashion design. In 2006, she testified before the House Judiciary Committee in favor of the bill now referred to as the Innovative Design Protection Act, which she helped draft. She has continued to speak about the bill and to provide updates on design protection in Congress and the courts. She has been an expert and amicus brief author in multiple cases pertaining to brand protection, including Star Athletica, LLC v. Varsity Brands, Inc.

=== Civil rights ===
Scafidi was a founding board member of the Model Alliance, which was formed after Scafidi approached model advocate Sara Ziff to discuss organizational strategy after a showing of Ziff's documentary, Picture Me. Scafidi and Fashion Law Institute assisted with the drafting and enactment of a New York state law that established legal safeguards for models under the age of sixteen. Scafidi described this legislation as "one of the biggest developments in a century, bringing a whole new group under legal protection."

Scafidi is on the advisory board of the Humans of Fashion Foundation, an organization dedicated to curbing harassment throughout the fashion industry.

=== Cultural appropriation ===
Scafidi is the author of Who Owns Culture?, a study of cultural identity in the contemporary marketplace. Scafidi's work on cultural appropriation and ethnographic legal history has been cited in a range of scholarly articles. As she explained in a January 2006 talk at the annual meeting of the Association of American Law Schools, Scafidi's work in both cultural appropriation and fashion grew out of an interest in forms of creativity that the law does not protect and the values implicit in this status, in contrast to other academics' focus on works with extensive and increasing intellectual property protection. Scafidi's work on cultural appropriation has also been cited on both sides in public debates over the use of culture in fashion, such as the Urban Outfitters' Navajo panty; the use of Native American garb in the 2012 Victoria's Secret Fashion Show;, literature, music, and art; and Moana and other halloween costumes.

== Selected writing ==
- Counterfeit Chic
- Who Owns Culture? Authenticity and Appropriation in American Law, 2005. ISBN 0-8135-3606-5.
- "Intellectual Property and Fashion Design," in Peter Yu, ed., Intellectual Property and Information Wealth, vol. 1, p. 115 (2006).
- "Fiat Fashion Law! The Launch of a Label--and a New Branch of Law", in Navigating Fashion Law (2012)
- "F.I.T. Fashion as Information Technology," in Syracuse Law Review, Vol. 59, p. 69 (2008)
- "Knock it off! Quashing design pirates" (with Narciso Rodriguez), Chicago Tribune, 29 August 2010.
- "Think Tank: Is Your Company's Dress Code Illegal?", Women's Wear Daily, 29 March 2017.
- "Brief of Fashion Law Institute et al. in Support of Respondents" Star Athletic, LLC v. Varsity Brands, Inc., 2016.
