= Kolpik =

Traditional headgear of some Hasidic rebbes

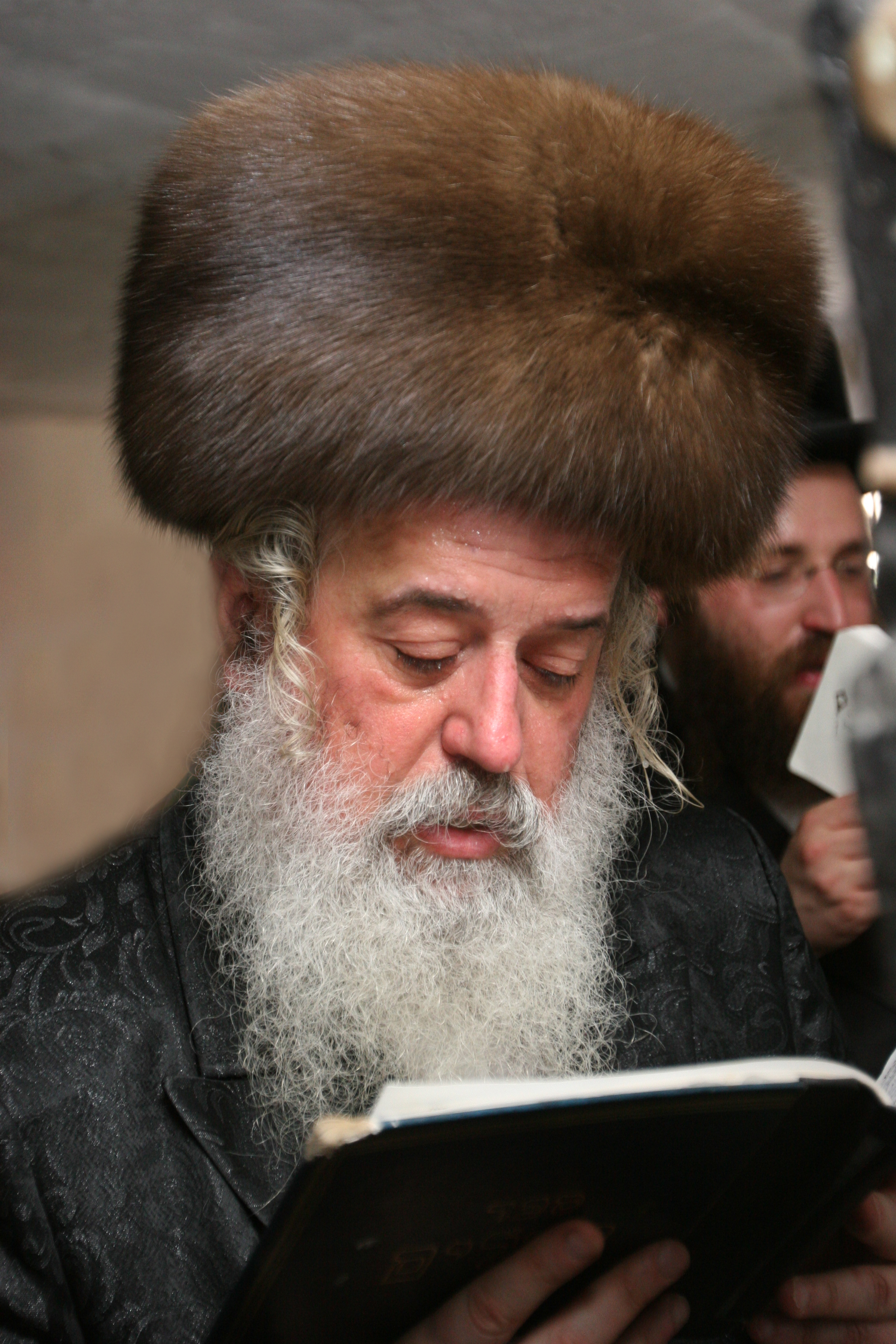
Moshe Leib Rabinovich, the Munkacser rebbe, wearing a kolpik

In Ashkenazi Jewish tradition, a kolpik is a type of traditional headgear worn in families of some Chassidic rebbes (Hasidic rabbis) of Galician or Hungarian dynastic descent, by their unmarried children on the Sabbath (Shabbat), and by some rebbes on some special occasions other than Shabbat or major holidays.

The kolpik is made from brown fur, as opposed to a spodik, worn by Polish Chassidic dynasties, which is fashioned out of black fur. A shtreimel, another similar type of fur hat worn by Hasidim, is shorter in height, wider, and disc-shaped, while a kolpik is taller, thinner in bulk, and of cylindrical shape.

It is seen as an intermediate level garment between Shabbat and weekday dress.

The days that some rebbes don a kolpik include:

- Rosh Chodesh Meal
- Hanukah
- Tu BiShvat Meal
- Isru Chag Meal
- Meal served to the poor a few days before a child's wedding
- Yartzeit Meal

It is often thought that Jews adopted wearing fur hats from the Eastern Europeans, possibly from the nobility. In his memoir A World Apart: A Memoir of Jewish Life in Nineteenth Century Galicia, Joseph Margoshes (1866–1955) writes regarding Rabbi Shimon Sofer's election to the Imperial Council of Austria:

The election of the Krakow Rabbi to the Austrian Reichstag made a tremendous impression on the entire Jewish world, ... It gave them enormous pleasure to see even a single Rabbi achieve the major honour of sitting among so many great personages, clad in a fine calpac amid such esteemed gentlemen. The poor things did not know that the calpac was part of historic Polish dress, and that many Poles, especially extreme nationalists, would wear these same calpacs at their meetings.

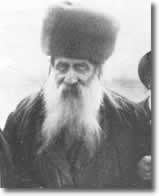
The third Belzer Rebbe, Yissachar Dov Rokeach, wearing a "kolpik"

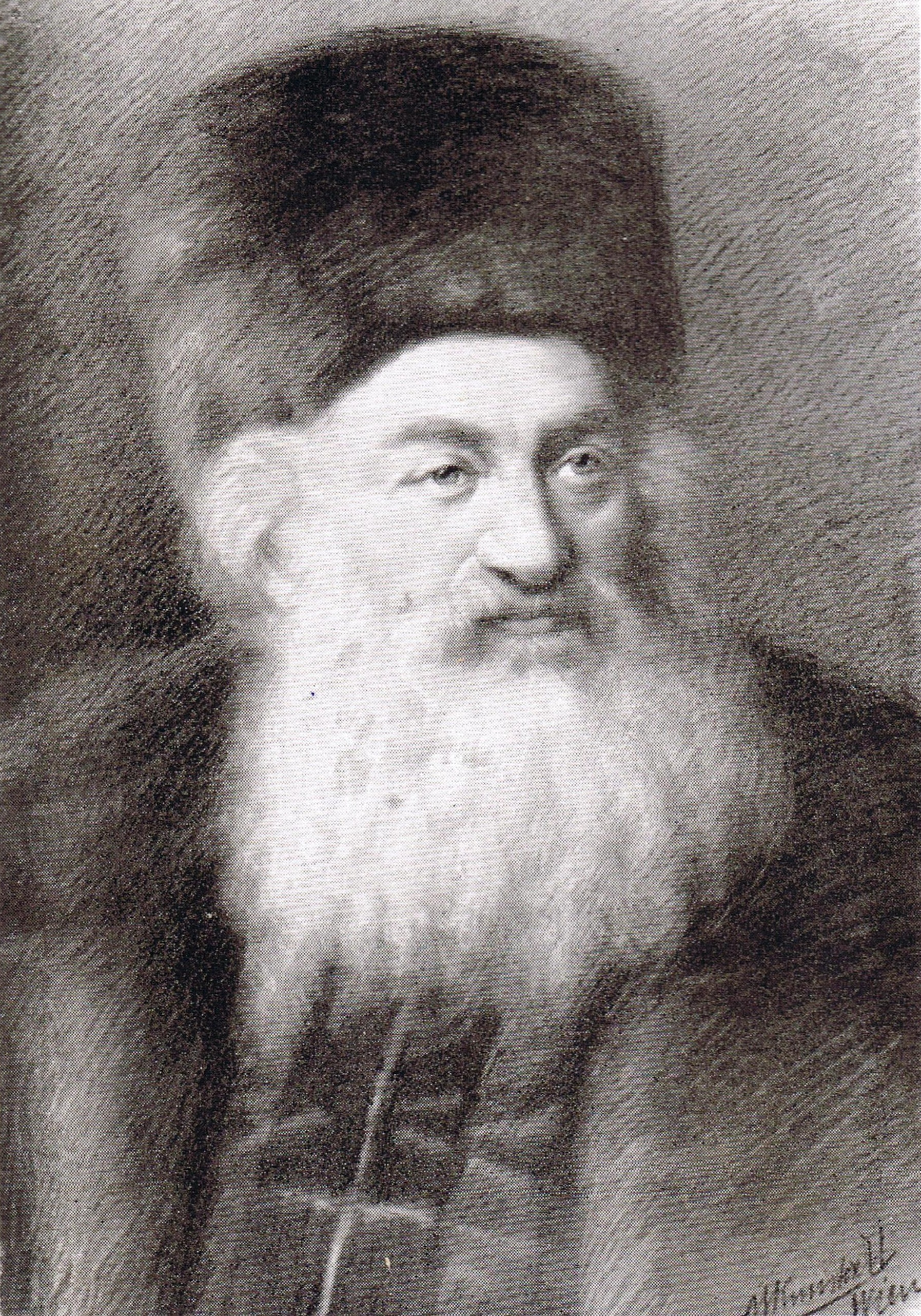
Rabbi Shimon Sofer wearing a "kolpik"

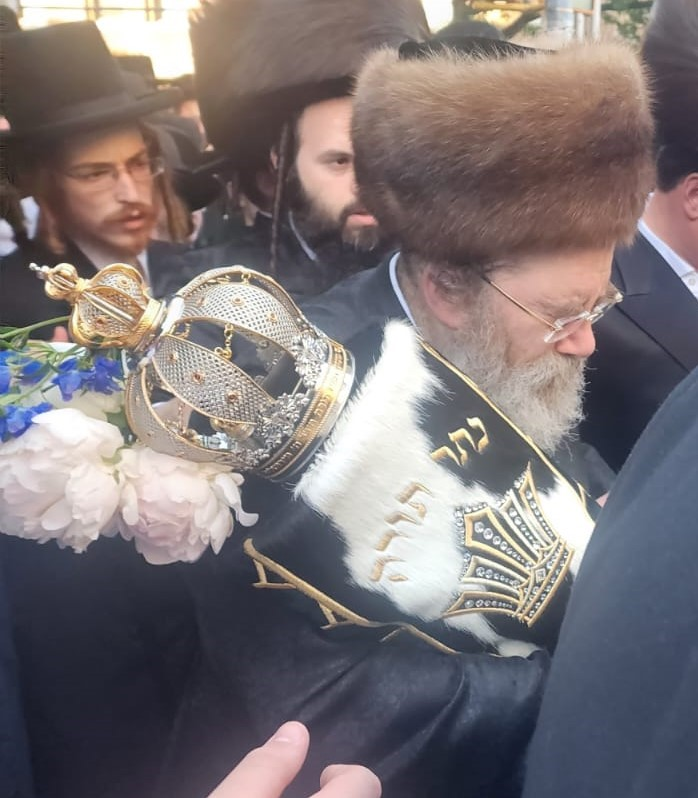
Rabbi From Stitchin wearing his grandfather's kolpik when bringing a Torah scroll into his Beit Midrash in Borough Park

== See also ==
- List of hat styles
- List of fur headgear
- List of headgear
