= Shtreimel =

Fur hat worn by married Hasidic Jewish men

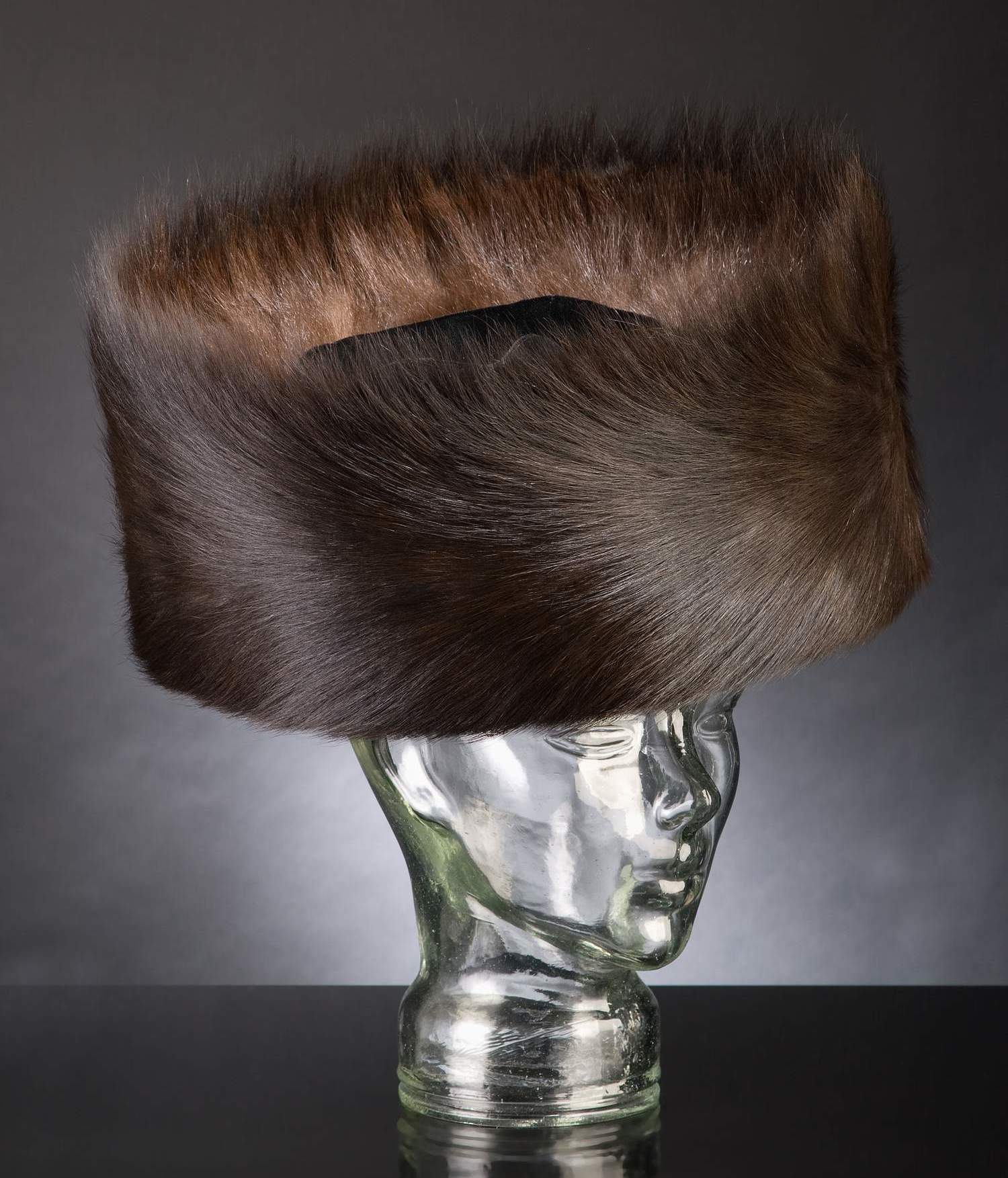
Shtreimel on a mannequin

A shtreimel (Yiddish: שטרײַמל shtrayml, plural: שטרײַמלעך shtraymlekh or שטרײַמלען shtraymlen) is a fur hat worn by some Ashkenazi Jewish men, mainly members of Hasidic Judaism, on Shabbat and Jewish holidays and other festive occasions. In Jerusalem, the shtreimel is also worn by Litvak Jews. The shtreimel is generally worn after marriage, although it may be worn by boys after bar-mitzvah age in some communities.

== History ==
There is speculation surrounding the origin of the shtreimel. Different theories hold that it is of Tatar, Turkish, Russian, or Polish origin, but it is not possible to establish a clear chronology. A common view is that the shtreimel was adapted by Jews living in Europe as a warm winter hat, possibly inspired by nobility; the shtreimel is comparable in construction to fur hats historically worn by gentile nobles and commoners across Europe and Russia. According to the Jewish Historical Institute in Warsaw, the shtreimel could come from a period in the 17th century when Oriental costumes were considered fashionable by the nobility of the Polish–Lithuanian Commonwealth (Sarmatism). One legend says that the initial reason for adopting the shtreimel was that the Jews were forced to wear an animal tail as a public humiliation.

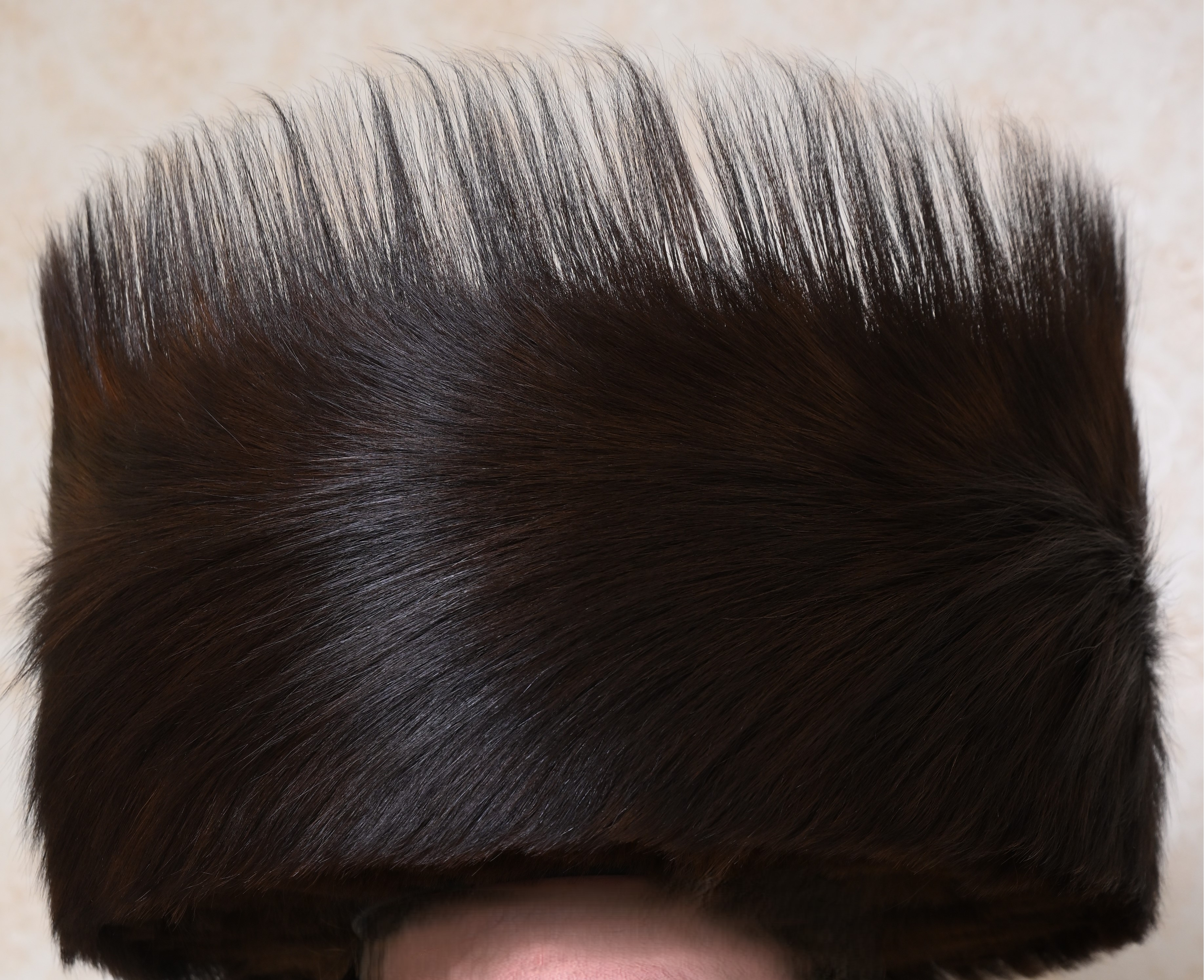
Modern Shtreimel

== Types of shtreimels ==
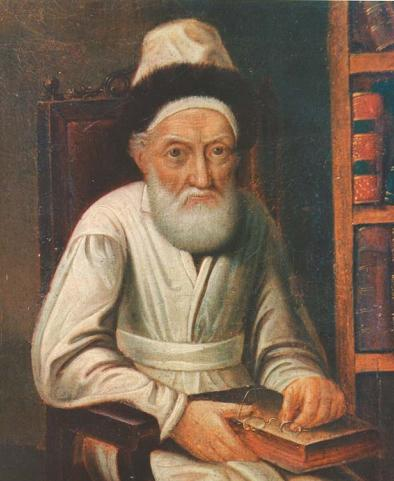
Portrait of Menachem Mendel Schneersohn in a shtreimel

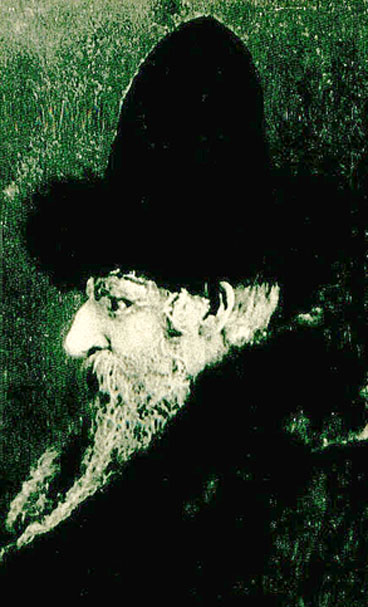
Portrait of David Moses Friedman of the Chortkov dynasty in the shtreimel of the Ruzhin dynasty

Shtreimels worn by the Hasidim of Galicia, Romania, and Hungary and by Lithuanian Jews up until the 20th century were made of a large circular piece of black velvet surrounded by fur.

Hasidim originating from Congress Poland wear a high shtreimel (often called a spodik). The shtreimel of the Rebbes of the Ruzhin and Skolye dynasties is pointed upward.

== Symbolism ==
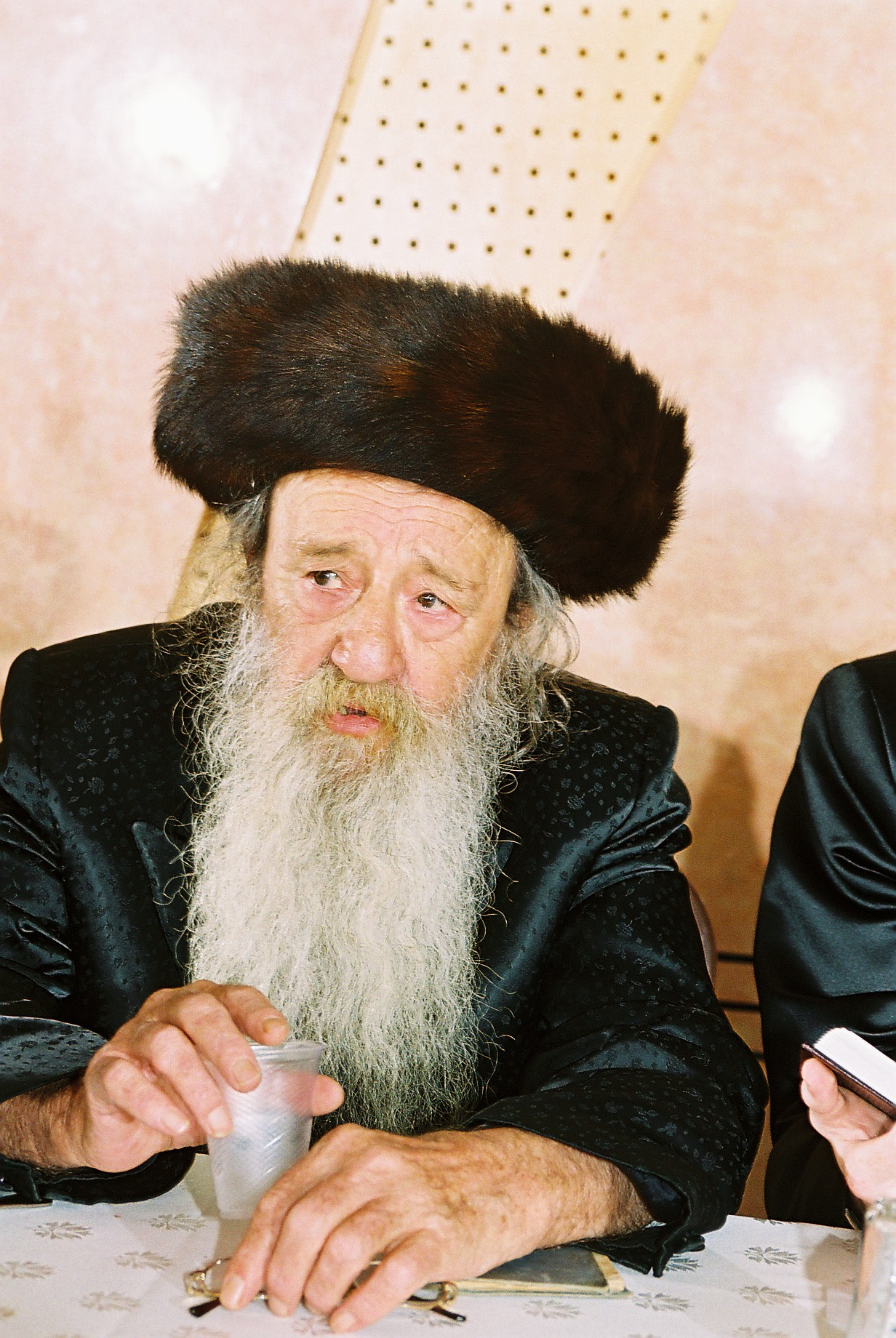
A rabbi dressed in shtreimel, Jerusalem

While there is strong religious custom for Jewish males to cover their heads, from the standpoint of Jewish law there is no religious significance to the use of the shtreimel as the head covering. However, the wearing of two head coverings (the shtreimel is always worn over a yarmulke) is considered to add additional spiritual merit, plus the presence of beautiful craftsmanship adds beautification and honour to the custom.

Such headgear is worn on special occasions (such as Shabbat), in the synagogue, or by office-holders such as rabbis.

According to Rabbi Aaron Wertheim, Rabbi Pinchas of Koretz (1726–1791) stated that "[t]he acronym for Shabbos is: Shtreimel Bimkom Tefillin - the shtreimel takes the place of tefillin." Since wearing special clothing on Shabbat is a form of sanctification, among the Hasidim of Galicia, Poland and Hungary the shtreimel is associated with the holiness of Shabbat, a crown such as that worn by royalty, which enhances and beautifies Shabbat.

Arnon asserts that the number of furs used in the manufacture of the shtreimel has some significance. Common numbers are 13, 18, and 26, corresponding respectively to the Thirteen Attributes of Mercy, the numerical value (gematria) of the word for life (Hebrew: חי), and the numerical value of the Tetragrammaton. Contemporary shtreimlach may include higher numbers of tails. At least one maker creates shtreimelach with 42 tails, symbolizing the 42-letter Divine Name.

Male Orthodox Jews can be highly conservative regarding headgear, and some traditional Jews still wear Western-invented fedoras or homburgs.

== Manufacture ==
The shtreimel is typically custom-made from the tails of Canadian or Russian sable, beech marten, baum marten (European pine marten), or gray fox. The shtreimel is almost always the most costly article of Hasidic clothing. Usually, but not always, the bride's father purchases the shtreimel for the groom upon his wedding. Nowadays, it is customary in the United States to purchase two shtreimels; a cheaper version, called the regen shtreimel ("rain shtreimel"), is for occasions when the expensive one may get damaged. In Israel, due to the economic circumstances of most members of the Hasidic community in that country, the vast majority of shtreimel-wearers own only one shtreimel. The shtreimel manufacturers (shtreimel machers) keep their trade a closely guarded secret.

In 2013, Rabbi Shlomo Pappenheim, chair of the Eda Haredit (an umbrella organisation for ultra-orthodox News), recommended the use of synthetic materials for shtreimels due to animal cruelty concerns.

== See also ==
- Hasidic clothing
- List of hat styles
- List of fur headgear
- Papakha
- Kolpik
- Spodik
