= Sara Ziff =

American model

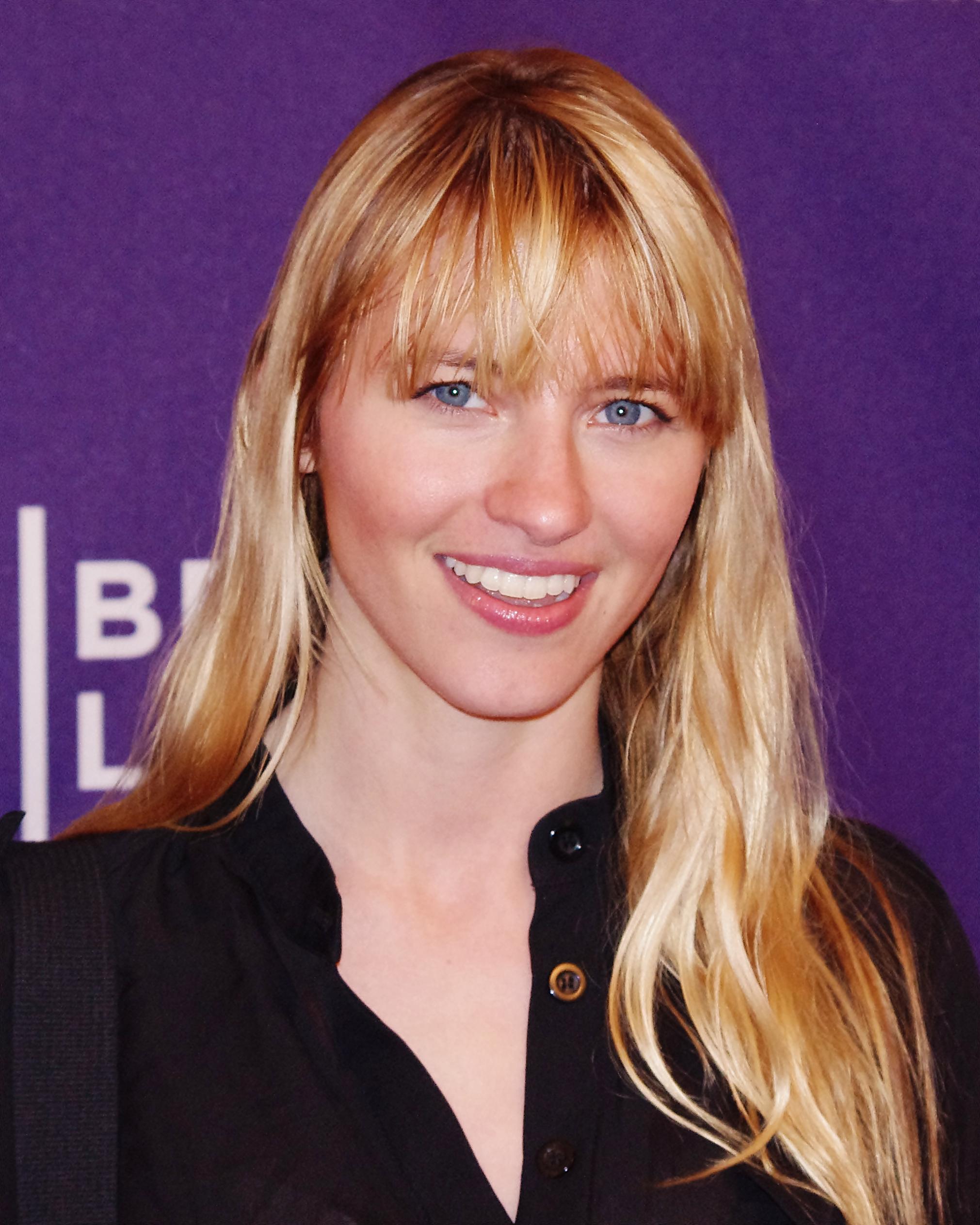
- Born: New York City, U.S.
- Education: Columbia University (B.A.); Harvard University (M.P.A.)
- Occupations: Model; Executive Director, Model Alliance

Sara Ziff is an American fashion model, filmmaker, and labor activist. She is the founder and executive director of the Model Alliance, a nonprofit policy and advocacy organization in New York City.

== Early life and education ==
Sara Ziff was born and raised in New York City. Ziff attended the Bronx High School of Science and the Dalton School. Ziff graduated with a B.A. in Political Sciences, magna cum laude from Columbia University, and she earned her M.P.A. at Harvard Kennedy School.

== Modeling career ==
Ziff began modeling at 14, after being scouted on a street in Manhattan by a fashion photographer. Ziff has appeared as the face of advertising campaigns for companies including Tommy Hilfiger, Kenzo, Stella McCartney, and Kenneth Cole. She has walked in runway fashion shows for brands such as Prada, Chanel, Christian Dior, Calvin Klein, Marc Jacobs, Dolce & Gabbana, Dries Van Noten, Balenciaga, Chloé and Alexander McQueen.

== Filmmaking and writing ==
With her co-director Ole Schell, Ziff chronicled her modeling journey in the award-winning documentary Picture Me. The film gives an inside look into the modeling industry, showing the highs and lows of a seemingly glamorous business. After Picture Me, Ziff directed a three-part web mini-series for the modeling blog of New York Magazine, "The Cut." In 2014, Ziff released the preview of "Tangled Thread," a documentary about Bangladesh's garment industry and women organizing for better working conditions across the supply chain.

She has contributed as an op-ed columnist for The New York Times, Equal Times, and The Guardian.

== Activism ==
Ziff is an advocate for better working conditions in the modeling industry, which she has described as "an overlooked frontier of women's rights and workers' rights." In 2012, she formed the Model Alliance, a non-profit organization that advocates for fair labor standards for models working in the American fashion industry. In 2013, under Ziff's leadership, the Model Alliance championed the Child Model Act in New York State, which reclassified models under 18 as child performers and extended them basic labor protections, including provisions for educational requirements, maximum working hours, and trust accounts. New York Magazine declared her "the Norma Rae of the runway" and the AFL–CIO called her "America's next top role model."

In 2012, Ziff became involved with Save the Children, a non-governmental organization that promotes children's rights, provides relief and helps support children in developing countries. At the United Nations, Ziff introduced the organization's global flagship report, "A Life Free From Hunger – Tackling Childhood Malnutrition."

In 2012, Ziff began campaigning for better working conditions for garment workers in Bangladesh. In September 2013, she joined other fashion models and labor rights activists at New York Fashion Week to encourage Nautica to sign the Accord on Fire and Building Safety in Bangladesh.

In 2019, the Model Alliance organized an open letter to Victoria's Secret, signed by more than 120 models and industry figures, urging the company to address sexual misconduct in the modeling industry and to adopt the organization's RESPECT Program. Ziff, as a representative of the group, pointed to allegations against photographers who had worked with Victoria's Secret's former parent company, L Brands and Jeffrey Epstein.

Ziff was also among a coalition of advocates who campaigned for New York State’s Adult Survivors Act, enacted in 2022, which opened a one-year window for survivors of sexual assault to file civil suits otherwise barred by the statute of limitations.

In 2022, Ziff and the Model Alliance introduced the Fashion Workers Act in New York with state legislators and fashion-industry supporters, including Karen Elson and Teddy Quinlivan. The bill was signed into law by Governor Kathy Hochul on December 21, 2024. The New York State Department of Labor states that the law establishes responsibilities and requirements for model management companies, model management groups and clients, including workplace protections for models.

In April 2023, Ziff filed a lawsuit against Harvey Weinstein, Miramax, Disney and others, alleging that former Miramax executive Fabrizio Lombardo raped her in 2001 while she was working as a model for his company.

In 2024, Ziff led the Model Alliance’s campaign for the Fashion Workers Act in New York State, which went into effect in 2025. It established new responsibilities and requirements for model management companies, model management groups, and clients. It also established new workplace protections for models.

== Awards ==
In 2012, Ziff was honored by the blog Jezebel as one of "The Jezebel 25," a group of "game-changing women" who embody the site's feminist ideals.

In 2013, Ziff was awarded the Susan B. Anthony award by the National Organization for Women for her dedication to improving the lives of young women and girls in New York City.

In 2014, Ziff was awarded the 1st Inspiration and Visionary award by the Women & Fashion Film Festival for her leadership and work empowering women and girls in the fashion industry.

In 2022, the Consulate General of France awarded Ziff the Chevalier dans l'Ordre National du Mérite, or Knight in the National Order of Merit.

In 2025, Ziff appeared on the Time 100 list of the World’s Most Influential Rising Stars.
