= Spodik =

Tall fur hat

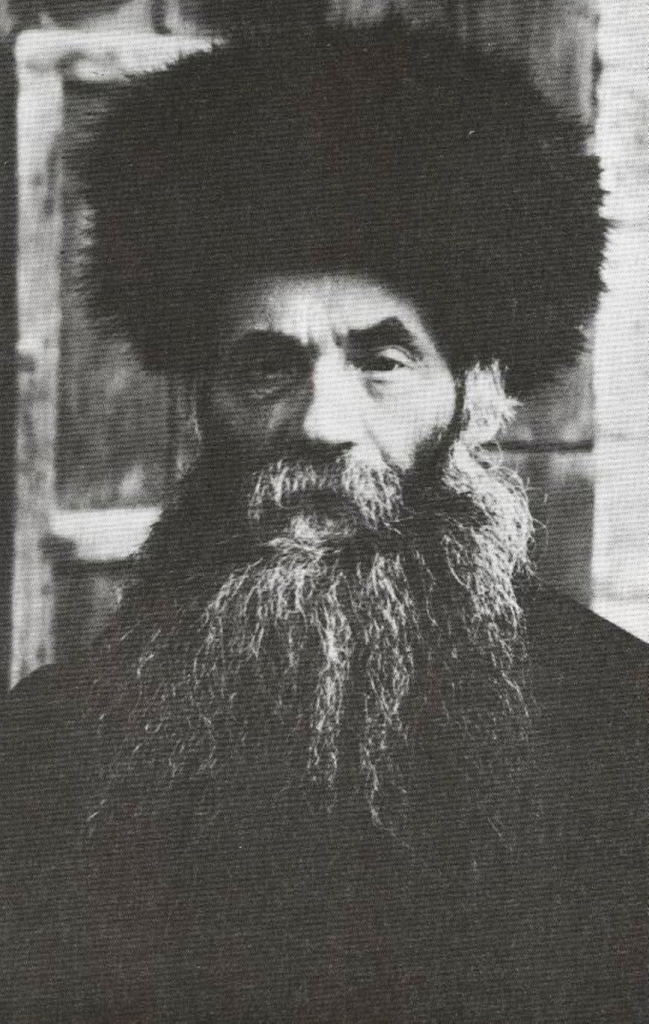
Rabbi Isser Zalman Meltzer wearing a spodik

A spodik (or spodek; Yiddish: ספּאָדיק spodik, from Polish spodek "saucer") is a tall, black fur hat worn by some Hasidic Jews, particularly by members of sects in 19th-century Congress Poland. The origins of the spodik and the shtreimel are unclear, but it is often thought that the Jews living in Europe adopted wearing fur hats from the Eastern European culture, and perhaps from the nobility.

== Description ==
Spodiks are to be distinguished from kolpiks, and from shtreimels, which are a similar types of fur hat worn by Hasidim. Shtreimels are shorter in height, wider, and donut-shaped, while spodiks are taller, thinner in bulk, and of cylindrical shape. Kolpiks and spodiks have the same shape, but the former are brown, while the latter are black. Such hats are typically worn only on special occasions, such as the Sabbath, holidays, and weddings.

Spodiks used to be made from fisher tails in North America. Nowadays they are made also from fox fur.

== Use ==
Ger Hasidim, being the largest Hasidic community of Polish origin, are the most famous for wearing spodiks. Virtually all married men among the Gerer Hasidim wear a spodik. Due to an edict by the Grand Rabbi of Ger designed to stop the extravagance of the hats, Gerrer Hasidim are only allowed to purchase fake fur spodiks that cost less than $600.

Other groups that wear Spodiks include Alexander, Amshinov, Ashlag, Kotzk, Modzitz, Ozharov, Radzin and Sochatchov.

== See also ==
- Kolpik—traditional Jewish fur hat
- List of hat styles
- List of fur headgear
- List of headgear
- Shtreimel—traditional Jewish fur hat
