= Model Alliance =

U.S. nonprofit advocacy group

- Formation: February 2012; 14 years ago
- Founder: Sara Ziff, President
- Type: nonprofit organization
- Purpose: advocacy group for fashion industry
- Location(s): 110 East 25th Street New York, NY 10010 United States
- Key people: Coco Rocha; Milla Jovovich; Karen Elson; Doutzen Kroes; Edie Campbell
- Website: modelalliance.org

The Model Alliance is a New York–based advocacy group focused on research and policy for models and others employed in the fashion industry. Founded in February 2012 by model Sara Ziff along with support from others models, the Model Alliance is a 501(c)(3) nonprofit organization. The organization advocates for workplace protections, stronger regulation of model management companies, protections for child models, and measures addressing harassment and abuse in the fashion industry.

== Advocacy ==
In addition to providing a discreet grievance reporting service, the Model Alliance advocates for the enforcement of existing child labor and contract laws, promotes equal opportunity and fosters a culture of accountability in the fashion industry.

Models who have served on the Model Alliance's Advisory Board include Coco Rocha, Milla Jovovich, Shalom Harlow, and Karen Elson.

In June 2013, the Model Alliance announced that New York State Senators Jeffrey Klein and Diane Savino had proposed legislation that would afford child models the same protections as all other child performers working in New York.

In October 2013, the Model Alliance announced that Governor Andrew M. Cuomo signed the child model bill (A.7787/S.5486) into law in New York State. In November 2013, the child model law was enacted and affords child models the same protections as other child performers working in New York State.

In February 2017, the Model Alliance released a study in which 81.5% of models reported having an underweight body mass index.

In May 2018, the Model Alliance published an open letter launching the RESPECT Program, an initiative intended to address sexual abuse and harassment in the fashion industry. The letter was signed by models including Amy Lemons, Doutzen Kroes, Edie Campbell, Frederique van der Wal, Gisele Bündchen, Karen Elson and Milla Jovovich.

In March 2022, the Model Alliance introduced the Fashion Workers Act in New York with state legislators and fashion-industry supporters. The organization described the bill as an effort to create labor rights for models and regulate model management companies. The bill was signed into law by Governor Kathy Hochul on December 21, 2024, and took effect on June 19, 2025. The New York State Department of Labor states that the law establishes new responsibilities and requirements for model management companies, model management groups and clients, as well as workplace protections for models. Registration requirements for model management companies and groups began on December 21, 2025.

== Founder ==
Sara Ziff is a model-turned-activist who was inspired to begin the Alliance based on her experiences in the modeling industry as a youth. At age 14, she was invited to the house of a photographer and told to take all her clothes off; later, at age 15, she went to another fashion shoot where drugs were available freely.

== Recognition ==
In 2021, the Council of Fashion Designers of America announced that the Model Alliance would receive the inaugural Positive Social Influence Award at the CFDA Fashion Awards. The CFDA described the organization as having been at the forefront of creating labor-rights protections for models since its founding in 2012.

== See also ==
- Equity (trade union)
