= Bendall =

Bendall is a surname. Notable people with the surname include:

- Albert Bendall (1884–1967), Australian politician
- Cecil Bendall (1856–1906), English scholar
- Dennis Bendall (born 1956), Australian rugby league player
- Frederick Bendall (1865–1941), English cricketer
- Haydn Bendall (born 1951), English record producer, engineer and mixer
- Mildred Bendall (1891–1977), active force of the avant-garde in Bordeaux
- Ron Bendall (1909–1983), British businessman
- Simon Bendall (1937–2019), English numismatist
- Steve Bendall (born 1973), English boxer
- Vivian Bendall (born 1938), Conservative MP for Ilford North from 1978 until 1997
- Wilfred Bendall (1850–1920), English musician

== See also ==
- Bendel (disambiguation)
- Bendle, type of belt
