= Bendle =

Belt used to fulfill the Jewish commandment of separating the mind and heart

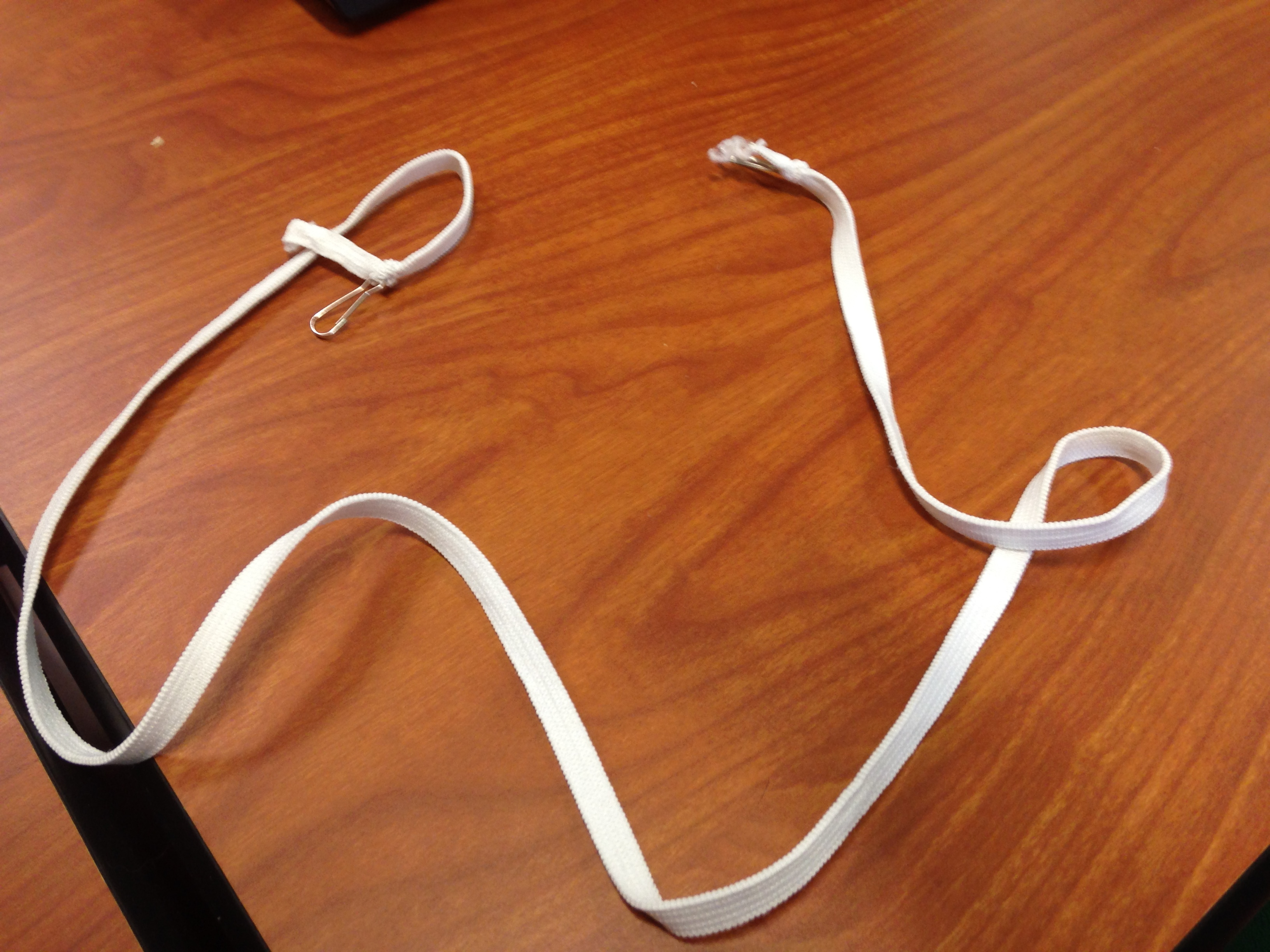
A Bendle serves the same purpose as a gartel does for Unmarried men in Hasidic Communities.

The Bendle or Bendel (from German-dialect 'Bändel' = high-German 'Bändchen' = diminutive of 'Band' = ribbon) is a belt primarily used to fulfill the Jewish commandment of separating the mind and the heart. It is primarily used by unmarried Chabad Chasidim during prayer. The Bendle is also worn shortly before prayer just as a gartel is, the only exception is that the bendle is used by non-married Chabad Haredi Jews during prayer. It does fulfill all the requirements of its cousin "the gartel" but, unlike the gartel which is worn on the outside of the bekishe or coat, the bendle is worn on the inside on top of the tallis kattan on the waist such as Chabad-Lubavitch. This is only for Chabad Hasidim and not all Chabadniks wear a bendle just preferring a standard belt. Most non-Chabad Hasidic, non-Hasidic Haredi and Orthodox Jews don a Gartel before prayer, whether married or unmarried. (depends on accepted custom of the group).
