= Rekel =

Clothing

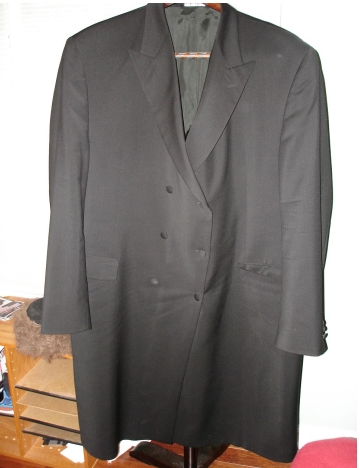
A woollen rekel

Rekel (Yiddish: רעקל, romanized: rekl) or lang rekel (plural רעקלעך rekelekh) is a type of frock coat worn mainly by Hasidic Jewish men during the Jewish workweek (Sunday-Friday). Though the rekel was intended for weekday use, some Hasidim wear it on Shabbat. However, a more formal coat, called a bekishe, is considered by many as a more proper Shabbat garment. The bekishe is usually made of polyester or silk, whereas the rekel is usually made of polyester or wool. By way of comparison, The New York Times described the bekeshe as a "fancier Sabbath version" of the rekel.

== Etymology ==
The Yiddish word rekel is a regular diminutive ultimately derived from the Middle German roc.

Prior to the use of the rekel as standard Hasidic garb, Hasidic coats were generally buttonless, white robes with black or multi-colour stripes held together by a gartel. The change in Hasidic dress occurred towards the end of the 19th century, when the Jewish Emancipation became successful. The old style is still maintained by many communities in Jerusalem, even non-Hasidic ones.

== Design ==
Unlike classic clothing, which has the button on the left side for women and on the right side for men, a Rekel (or other Jewish men's garment) is buttoned right on left.

Rekelech are generally made of a black or navy wool blend or of worsted wool. Today, some are made of 100% polyester. Many Hasidim in the past did not wear wool clothing, and the new polyester rekel makes it easier to keep the Biblical injunction against shatnez, the mixing of wool and linen. These garments tend to be light and thinner than the average suit coat, since they are generally worn throughout the year. Rekelech are usually sold as part of a suit with matching pants and a waistcoat (Yiddish: זשילעט, romanized: zhilte), though they are also sometimes available as suit separates.

The most common type of rekel is the double-breasted variety, but many other styles exist. These include a single-breasted version (typical of Breslover Hasidim), and a concealed button version, which many Gerer, Bobover and Klausenburger Hasidim wear. There is also a single-breasted version with a shawl collar and attached gartel. Several styles of unlined rekelech exist, typically worn in hot weather and often conforming to the styles noted above. All rekelech share a right over left button style, the opposite of what one would find on most men's clothing. Unlike most long coats rekelech tend not to have walking vents, but some of the concealed button and single-breasted rekelech do.

=== Color ===
As with most Haredi clothing today, rekelech may be darkly colored; black and navy blue are favorite color choices. Prior to World War II the most popular color for the rekel was a light grey, but this has fallen into disuse. Pinstripes have always been a common feature on rekelach. In recent times, rekelech with other patterns such as embossed checkers have caught on, particularly with the more colorful Breslov, Bobov, and Sanz-Klausenburg Hasidim. The rekelekh of these groups also tend to use lighter colors than those of other Hasidim, ranging anywhere from black to lighter shades of midnight blue.
