= Glenn Dynner =

American author and historian

- Born: April 11, 1969 (age 57); Maryland, United States
- Occupations: Historian, Academic, Author

Academic background
- Education: McGill University; Brandeis University
- Doctoral advisor: Antony Polonsky

Academic work
- Discipline: Jewish History and Religion
- Sub-discipline: Social History of Hasidism and the Haskala; Holocaust
- Institutions: University of Virginia
- Website: http://gdynner.com

Glenn Davis Dynner (born April 11, 1969) is an American author and historian specializing in religion and history of East European Jewry. He is the Co-Editor-in-Chief of Shofar: An Interdisciplinary Journal of Jewish Studies and the Jay Berkowitz Chair of Jewish History at University of Virginia.

== Education ==
Dynner received his B.A. in Comparative History from Brandeis University in 1993, his M.A. in Jewish Studies from McGill University in 1997, and his Ph.D. in Near Eastern & Judaic Studies from Brandeis University in 2002 (supervised by Antony Polonsky). He works primarily in Polish, Yiddish, and Hebrew sources on the Jewish social and religious history in Poland, and specializes in the Hasidic movement.

== Media appearances ==
In 2011, Dynner appeared on NBC's Who Do You Think You Are? with actress Gwyneth Paltrow. Throughout the episode, Dynner helps Gwyneth Paltrow uncover her ancestral Jewish past. On the same show and its spin-offs, he also consulted on the Rashida Jones and Bernie Sanders episodes.

== Publications ==
=== Books ===
- Glenn Dynner (2024). Light of Learning: Hasidism in Poland on the Eve of the Holocaust. Oxford University Press. ISBN 978-0-19-998852-5.
- Glenn Dynner (2013). Yankel's Tavern: Jews, Liquor, and Life in the Kingdom of Poland. Oxford University Press. ISBN 978-0-19-998852-5.
- Glenn Dynner (2008). Men of Silk: The Hasidic Conquest of Polish Jewish Society. Oxford University Press. ISBN 978-0-19-538265-5.
- Glenn Dynner, ed. (2011). Holy Dissent: Jewish and Christian Mystics in Eastern Europe. Wayne State University Press. ISBN 978-0-814-33597-0. Archived from the original on 2022-08-15.
- Glenn Dynner, ed. (2015). Polin: Studies in Polish Jewry: Jews in the Kingdom of Poland, 1815-1914 Volume 27. The Littman Library of Jewish Civilization. ISBN 978-1-906-76421-0.
- Glenn Dynner, ed. (2015). Warsaw. The Jewish Metropolis: Essays in Honor of the 75th Birthday of Professor Antony Polonsky. Brill Academic Pub. ISBN 978-9-004-29181-2.

=== Chapters ===
- "The Garment of Torah: Clothing Decrees and the First Gerer Rebbe" in Warsaw. The Jewish Metropolis
- "Those Who Stayed: Women and Jewish Traditionalism in East Central Europe" in New Directions in the History of the Jews in the Polish Lands
- "Jewish Quarters: The Economics of Segregation in the Kingdom of Poland" in Purchasing Power: The Economics of Modern Jewish History

=== Articles ===
- Dynner, Glenn (July 2018). "Replenishing the 'Fountain of Judaism': Traditionalist Jewish Education in Interwar Poland." Jewish History 31 (3–4): 229–261.
- Dynner, Glenn (Summer 2014). "Brief Kvetches: Notes to a 19th -Century Miracle Worker." Jewish Review of Books 5 (2): 33–35.
- Dynner, Glenn (Winter 2014). "'A Jewish Drunk Is Hard to Find': Jewish Drinking Practices and the Sobriety Stereotype in Eastern Europe." The Jewish Quarterly Review 104 (1): 9–23.

=== Book reviews ===
- Dynner, Glenn (Fall 2018). "Visualizing Hasidism." Jewish Review of Books 9 (1): 13–14.

== Awards ==
- 2019 - Guggenheim Fellowship
- 2017 - Senior Research Scholar at Yale University Library's Fortunoff Video Archive for Holocaust Testimonies
- 2016 - The American Jewish Joint Distribution Committee (JDC) Fred and Ellen Lewis Archives Fellowship
- 2013–2014 - National Endowment for the Humanities (NEH) Senior Scholar, Center for Jewish History
- 2013–2014 - Trustee Faculty Development Fund, Sarah Lawrence College
- 2009 - University of Pennsylvania, Katz Center for Advanced Judaic Studies (CAJS) Fellowship theme: “Jews and Commerce”
- 2006 - National Jewish Book Awards Finalist for Men of Silk: The Hasidic Conquest of Polish Jewish Society (Oxford University Press, 2008)
- 2004 - Koret Jewish Book Award for Men of Silk: The Hasidic Conquest of Polish Jewish Society (Oxford University Press, 2008)
- 2000 - Tauber Institute of Modern Jewish Studies Fellowship, Brandeis University
- 1999 - U.S. Fulbright Award (Warsaw, Poland)

== Teaching ==
Dynner teaches numerous upper-level seminars at Sarah Lawrence covering the history of Jewish life in Eastern Europe. In the past, his classes included: The Holocaust, Jews and Violence: From the Bible to the Present, and First-Year Studies: Jewish Spirituality and Culture.

== Personal ==
Dynner's father Alan Roy Dynner is the former VP of Eaton Vance.
