= Shofar (journal) =

- Discipline: Jewish studies
- Language: English
- Edited by: Glenn Dynner and Ranen Omer-Sherman

Publication details
- History: 1982–present
- Publisher: Purdue University Press (United States)
- Frequency: Triannual

Standard abbreviations
- ISO 4: Shofar

Indexing
- ISSN: 1534-5165 (print); 0882-8539 (web)
- LCCN: 92645818
- OCLC no.: 163816671

Links
- Journal homepage; Online access at Project MUSE

Shofar: An Interdisciplinary Journal of Jewish Studies is a triannual peer-reviewed academic journal published by Purdue University Press on behalf of the university's Jewish Studies Program. Shofar is the official journal of the Midwest and Western Jewish Studies Associations. The journal publishes original, scholarly work and reviews a wide range of recent books in Judaica.

== History ==
The journal was originally established as a departmental newsletter by Joseph Haberer in 1981. Over time, it developed into a peer-reviewed journal.

In 2023, the journal accepted an article about the marginalization of Palestinians in the Association for Jewish Studies and later withdrew the paper shortly before it was due to be published.

== See also ==
- Journal of Jewish Studies
