= Mitzvah tantz =

Hasidic Jewish dance custom

Mitzvah tantz (lit. "mitzvah-dance" in Yiddish) is the Hasidic custom of the men dancing before the bride on the wedding night, after the wedding feast. Commonly, the bride, who usually stands perfectly still at one end of the room, will hold one end of a long sash or a gartel while the one dancing before her holds the other end. There are times when one of the leading rabbis, usually her father or grandfather, will dance with her as well. The dance is usually a highly charged emotional moment, wherein the dancer prays silently for the couple's success in life.

== Background ==
The custom, predating Hasidism, was mentioned first in the medieval Machzor Vitri and has its basis in the Talmud (Ketubot), where there is an expression ketsad merakdim lifnei hakallah "how does one dance before the bride?". Dance, descriptions of dance, and questions of behavior during dance appear in Jewish texts, like the Talmud. Although most Orthodox groups do not observe this practice, Hasidim have maintained a form of this ancient custom and consider it a great honor to be able to dance in front of the bride to honor her on her wedding night, after the guests have departed. Custom dictates that only close relatives would participate in the dance.

Dancing before the bride has been part of Jewish communities from the fourth century to modern day. Examples of early variations of the dance have been found in authoritative Jewish texts such as the Talmud, Rabbi Joseph Caro's Shulhan Arukh, responsa literature, and other rabbinical books.

== Debates ==
The varied versions of the dance are related to issues of purity, modesty, and even menstruation as Hasidic Jewish populations attempted to retain modesty while still participating in the dance. The dance is highly debated largely because of the values of earlier communities that practiced the dance. Much of Jewish law is related to what is or is not proper behavior, especially relating to gender. For the ultra-orthodox, if contact with the opposite sex was not allowed at social occurrences, how could appropriate contact occur during the dance? The practice of holding a handkerchief between dancers of opposite sex which “separated” them became common and acted as a substitute for holding hands. Although some variations have included gloves, table cloths, wedding dress trains or belts, the handkerchief is most commonly used. Some Jewish communities in Eastern Europe during the sixteenth and seventeenth centuries were mostly performing the dance without any separation between the bride or other women and the male dancers with few separating from physical contact. Rabbinical writings during this period address the lack of separation in condemnation. Most rabbis during that time period of Jewish history were not in favor of dancing without some type of covering or separation. In Eastern, Western, and Southern Europe, Jewish communities used handkerchiefs; rabbis of these communities acknowledged handkerchiefs as the “least evil way” to perform the dance with both sexes.

== Bride and groom rejoice ==
During the mitzvah tantz, the bride and all the women are brought to the men's section and there is no mechitza separating them. In some instances, the mechitza will be moved aside entirely with all the women present seated facing the men on the other side. If there is a large crowd at a wedding of a notable rabbi, most of the women will be looking down from a higher women's gallery.

The groom and most of his male relatives take turns rejoicing in front of the new bride at the time of the mitzvah tantz. In the case of the marriage of children or grandchildren of notable rebbes, this becomes an opportunity for the entire community, followers and admirers of the rabbis involved to watch and rejoice as the mitzvah tantz is done by the leading rebbes and rabbis in attendance. This may go on all night until dawn.
