= Frederick Bendall =

English cricketer

Frederick Bendall (18 December 1865 – 27 April 1941) was an English cricketer. He was a right-handed batsman and right-arm medium-pace bowler who played for Gloucestershire. He was born in Montpellier, Cheltenham and died in Tivoli, Cheltenham.

Bendall made a single first-class appearance for the side, during the 1887 season, against Surrey. From the tailend, he scored a duck in the first innings in which he batted, and 3 runs in the second, as Gloucestershire lost the match by an innings margin.
