= Hasidic Judaism =

Religious subgroup of modern Judaism

Hasidism
- Hebrew: חסידות
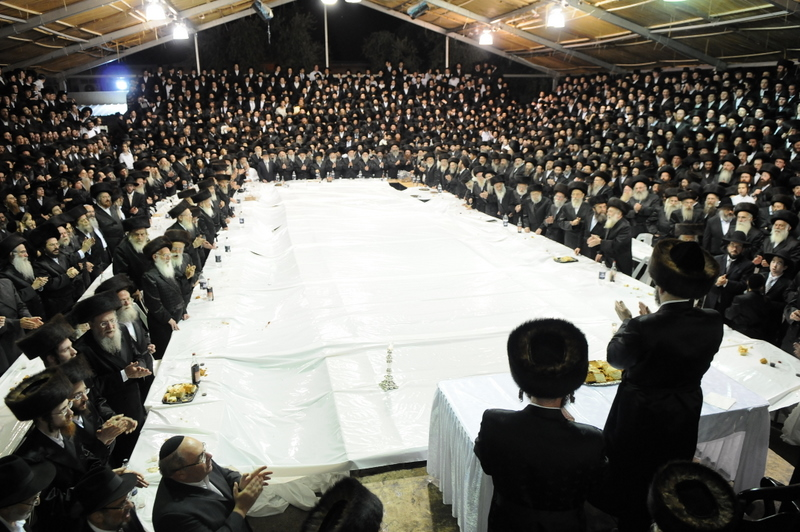
- A tish of the Boyan Hasidic dynasty in Jerusalem, holiday of Sukkot, 2009
- Scripture: Torah, Talmud, Kabbalistic texts
- Theology: Jewish mysticism (Kabbalah), Haredi Judaism
- Polity: Dynastic, led by a Rebbe
- Major dynasties: See List of Hasidic dynasties and groups
- Region: Worldwide, primarily Israel, United States
- Language: Yiddish, Hebrew, English, local languages
- Founder: Baal Shem Tov
- Origin: c. 1730-1770 present-day Western Ukraine (Podolia, Volhynia etc.) and Moldova
- Separations: Misnagdim, Haskalah
- Members: 130,000 households (2016)

Hasidism (Hebrew: חסידות, romanized: Ḥăsīdūt) or Hasidic Judaism is a religious movement within Judaism that arose in the 18th century as a spiritual revival movement in contemporary Western Ukraine before spreading rapidly throughout Eastern Europe. Today, most of those affiliated with the movement, known as hassidim, reside in Israel and in the United States, and to a lesser extent in Canada, the United Kingdom, Argentina, and Belgium.

Israel Ben Eliezer, the "Baal Shem Tov", is regarded as its founding father, and his disciples developed and disseminated it. Present-day Hasidism is a sub-group within Haredi Judaism and is noted for its religious conservatism and social seclusion. Its members aim to adhere closely both to Orthodox Jewish practice – with the movement's own unique emphases – and the prewar lifestyle of Eastern European Jews. Many elements of the latter, including various special styles of dress and the use of the Yiddish language, are nowadays associated almost exclusively with Hasidism.

Hasidic thought draws heavily on Lurianic Kabbalah, and, to an extent, is a popularization of it. Teachings emphasize God's immanence in the universe, the need to cleave and be one with him at all times, the devotional aspect of religious practice, and the spiritual dimension of corporeality and mundane acts. Hasidim, the adherents of Hasidism, are organized in independent sects known as "courts" or dynasties, each headed by its own hereditary male leader, a Rebbe. Reverence and submission to the Rebbe are key tenets, as he is considered a spiritual authority with whom the follower must bond to gain closeness to God. The various "courts" share basic convictions, but operate apart and possess unique traits and customs. Affiliation is often retained in families for generations, and being Hasidic is as much a sociological factor – entailing birth into a specific community and allegiance to a dynasty of Rebbes – as it is a religious one. There are several "courts" with many thousands of member households each, and hundreds of smaller ones. As of 2015, there are roughly 250,000 followers of Hasidic Judaism worldwide, about 2% of the global Jewish population.

== Etymology ==
The terms hasid and hasidut, meaning "pietist" and "piety", have a long history in Judaism. The Talmud and other old sources refer to the "Pietists of Old" (Hasidim haRishonim) who would contemplate an entire hour in preparation for prayer. The phrase denoted extremely devoted individuals who not only observed the Law to its letter, but performed good deeds even beyond it. Adam himself is honored with the title, in tractate Eruvin 18b by Rabbi Meir: "Adam was a great hasid, having fasted for 130 years." The first to adopt the epithet collectively were apparently the hasidim in Second Temple period Judea, known as Hasideans after the Greek rendering of their name, who perhaps served as the model for those mentioned in the Talmud. The title continued to be applied as an honorific for the exceptionally devout. In 12th-century Rhineland, or Ashkenaz in Jewish parlance, another prominent school of ascetics named themselves hasidim; to distinguish them from the rest, later research employed the term Ashkenazi Hasidim. In the 16th century, when Kabbalah spread, the title also became associated with it. Jacob ben Hayyim Zemah wrote in his glossa on Isaac Luria's version of the Shulchan Aruch that, "One who wishes to tap the hidden wisdom, must conduct himself in the manner of the Pious."

The movement founded by Israel Ben Eliezer in the 18th century adopted the term hasidim in the original connotation. But when the sect grew and developed specific attributes, from the 1770s, the names gradually acquired a new meaning. Its common adherents, belonging to groups each headed by a spiritual leader, were henceforth known as Hasidim. The transformation was slow: The movement was at first referred to as "New Hasidism" by outsiders (as recalled in the autobiography of Salomon Maimon), to separate it from the old one, and its enemies derisively mocked its members as Mithasdim, "[those who] pretend [to be] hasidim". Yet, eventually, the young sect gained such a mass following that the old connotation was sidelined. In popular discourse, at least, "Hasid" came to denote someone who follows a religious teacher from the movement. It also entered Modern Hebrew as such, meaning "adherent" or "disciple". One was not merely a Hasid anymore, observed historian David Assaf, but a Hasid of someone or some dynasty in particular. This linguistic transformation paralleled that of the word tzaddik, "righteous", which the Hasidic leaders adopted for themselves – though they are known colloquially as Rebbes or by the honorific acronym Admor. Originally denoting an observant, moral person, in Hasidic literature, tzaddik became synonymous with the often hereditary master heading a sect of followers.

== Hasidic philosophy ==
=== Distinctions ===
The lengthy history of Hasidism, the numerous schools of thought therein, and its definitive use of homiletic literature and sermons – comprising numerous references to earlier sources in the Torah, Talmud, and exegesis as a means to grounding itself in tradition – to convey its ideas make the isolation of a common doctrine highly challenging to researchers. As noted by Joseph Dan, "Every attempt to present such a body of ideas has failed". Even motifs presented by scholars in the past as unique Hasidic contributions were later revealed to have been common among both their predecessors and opponents, all the more so regarding many other traits that are widely extant – these play, Dan added, "a prominent role in modern non-Hasidic and anti-Hasidic writings as well". The difficulty of separating the movement's philosophy from that of its main inspiration, Lurianic Kabbalah, and determining what was novel and what merely a recapitulation, also baffled historians. Some, like Louis Jacobs, regarded the early masters as innovators who introduced "much that was new if only by emphasis"; others, primarily Mendel Piekarz, argued to the contrary that but a little was not found in much earlier tracts, and the movement's originality lay in the manner it popularized these teachings to become the ideology of a well-organized sect.

Among the traits particularly associated with Hasidism is the importance of joy and happiness at worship and religious life. However, the sect undoubtedly stressed this aspect and still possesses a clear populist bent. Another example is the value placed on the simple, ordinary Jew in supposed contradiction with the favouring of elitist scholars beforehand; such ideas are common in ethical works far preceding Hasidism. The movement did for a few decades challenge the rabbinic establishment, which relied on the authority of Torah acumen, but affirmed the centrality of study very soon. Concurrently, the image of the Misnagdim, a term coined for those opposed to Hasidism, as dreary intellectuals who lacked spiritual fervour and opposed mysticism, is likewise unfounded. Neither did Hasidism, often portrayed as promoting healthy sensuality, unanimously reject the asceticism and self-mortification associated primarily with its rivals. Joseph Dan ascribed all these perceptions to so-called "Neo-Hasidic" writers and thinkers, like Martin Buber. In their attempt to build new models of spirituality for modern Jews, they propagated a romantic, sentimental image of the movement. The "Neo-Hasidic" interpretation influenced even scholarly discourse to a great degree, but had a tenuous connection with reality.

A further complication is the divide between what researchers term "early Hasidism", which ended roughly in the 1810s, and established Hasidism since then onwards. While the former was a highly dynamic religious revival movement, the latter phase is characterized by consolidation into sects with hereditary leadership. The mystical teachings formulated during the first era were by no means repudiated, and many Hasidic masters remained consummate spiritualists and original thinkers; as noted by Benjamin Brown, Buber's once commonly accepted view that the routinization constituted "decadence" was refuted by later studies, demonstrating that the movement remained very much innovative. Yet many aspects of early Hasidism were de-emphasized in favour of more conventional religious expressions, and its radical concepts were largely neutralized. Some Rebbes adopted a relatively rationalist bent, sidelining their explicit mystical, theurgical roles, and many others functioned almost solely as political leaders of large communities. As to their Hasidim, affiliation was less a matter of admiring a charismatic leader as in the early days, but rather birth into a family belonging to a specific "court".

=== Immanence ===
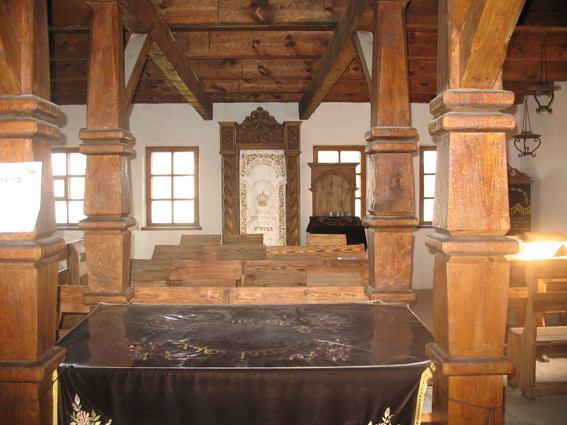
Rebuilt synagogue of the Baal Shem Tov.

The most fundamental theme underlying all Hasidic theory is the immanence of God in the universe, often expressed in a phrase from Tikunei haZohar, Leit atar panuy miné (Aramaic: "no site is devoid of Him"). This panentheistic concept was derived from Lurianic discourse, but greatly expanded in the Hasidic one. In the beginning, in order to create the world, God contracted (Tzimtzum) his omnipresence, the Ein Sof, leaving a Vacant Void (Chalal panuy), bereft of obvious presence and therefore able to entertain free will, contradictions and other phenomena seemingly separate from God Himself. These would have been impossible within his original, perfect existence. Yet, the very reality of the world which was created in the Void is entirely dependent on its divine origin. Matter would have been null and void without the true, spiritual essence it possesses. Just the same, the infinite Ein Sof cannot manifest in the Vacant Void, and must limit itself in the guise of measurable corporeality that may be perceived.

Thus, there is a dualism between the true aspect of everything and the physical side, false but ineluctable, with each evolving into the other: as God must compress and disguise himself, so must humans and matter in general ascend and reunite with the Omnipresence. Rachel Elior quoted Shneur Zalman of Liadi, in his commentary Torah Or on Genesis 28:22, who wrote that "this is the purpose of Creation, from Infinity to Finitude, so it may be reversed from the state of Finite to that of Infinity". Kabbalah stressed the importance of this dialectic, but mainly (though not exclusively) evoked it in cosmic terms, referring for example to the manner in which God progressively diminished himself into the world through the various dimensions, or Sephirot. Hasidism applied it also to the most mundane details of human existence. All Hasidic schools devoted a prominent place in their teaching, with differing accentuation, to the interchanging nature of Ein, both infinite and imperceptible, becoming Yesh, "Existent" – and vice versa. They used the concept as a prism to gauge the world, and the needs of the spirit in particular. Elior noted: "Reality lost its static nature and permanent value, now measured by a new standard, seeking to expose the Godly, boundless essence, manifest in its tangible, circumscribed opposite."

One major derivative of this philosophy is the notion of devekut, "communion". As God was everywhere, connection with him had to be pursued ceaselessly as well, in all times, places and occasions. Such an experience was in the reach of every person, who only had to negate his inferior impulses and grasp the truth of divine immanence, enabling him to unite with it and attain the state of perfect, selfless bliss. Hasidic masters, well versed in the teachings concerning communion, are supposed not only to gain it themselves, but to guide their flock to it. Devekut was not a strictly defined experience; many varieties were described, from the utmost ecstasy of the learned leaders to the common man's more humble yet no less significant emotion during prayer.

Closely linked with the former is Bitul ha-Yesh, "Negation of the Existent", or of the "Corporeal". Hasidism teaches that while a superficial observance of the universe by the "eyes of the flesh" (Einei ha-Basar) purportedly reflects the reality of all things profane and worldly, a true devotee must transcend this illusory façade and realize that there is nothing but God. It is not only a matter of perception, but very practical, for it entails also abandoning material concerns and cleaving only to the true, spiritual ones, oblivious to the surrounding false distractions of life. The practitioner's success in detaching from his sense of person, and conceive himself as Ein (in the double meaning of 'naught' and 'infinite'), is regarded as the highest state of elation in Hasidism. The true divine essence of man – the soul – may then ascend and return to the upper realm, where it does not possess an existence independent from God. This ideal is termed Hitpashtut ha-Gashmi'yut, "the expansion (or removal) of corporeality". It is the dialectic opposite of God's contraction into the world.

To be enlightened and capable of Bitul ha-Yesh, pursuing the pure spiritual aims and defying the primitive impulses of the body, one must overcome his inferior "Bestial Soul", connected with the Eyes of the Flesh. He may be able to tap into his "Divine Soul" (Nefesh Elohit), which craves communion, by employing constant contemplation, Hitbonenut, on the hidden Godly dimension of all that exists. Then he could understand his surroundings with the "Eyes of the Intellect". The ideal adherent was intended to develop equanimity, or Hishtavut in Hasidic parlance, toward all matters worldly, not ignoring them, but understanding their superficiality.

Hasidic masters exhorted their followers to "negate themselves", paying as little heed as they could for worldly concerns, and thus, to clear the way for this transformation. The struggle and doubt of being torn between the belief in God's immanence and the very real sensual experience of the indifferent world is a key theme in the movement's literature. Many tracts have been devoted to the subject, acknowledging that the "callous and rude" flesh hinders one from holding fast to the ideal, and these shortcomings are extremely hard to overcome even in the purely intellectual level, a fortiori in actual life.

Another implication of this dualism is the notion of "Worship through Corporeality", Avodah be-Gashmiyut. As the Ein Sof metamorphosed into substance, so may it in turn be raised back to its higher state; likewise, since the machinations in the higher Sephirot exert their influence on this world, even the most simple action may, if performed correctly and with understanding, achieve the reverse effect. According to Lurianic doctrine, the netherworld was suffused with divine sparks, concealed within "husks", qlippoth. The glints had to be recovered and elevated to their proper place in the cosmos. "Materiality itself could be embraced and consecrated", noted Glenn Dynner, and Hasidism taught that by common acts like dancing or eating, performed with intention, the sparks could be extricated and set free. Avodah be-Gashmiyut had a clear, if not implicit, antinomian edge, possibly equating sacred rituals mandated by Judaism with everyday activities, granting them the same status in the believer's eyes and having him content to commit the latter at the expense of the former. While at some occasions the movement did appear to step at that direction – for example, in its early days, prayer and preparation for it consumed so much time that adherents were blamed of neglecting sufficient Torah study – Hasidic masters proved highly conservative. Unlike in other, more radical sects influenced by kabbalistic ideas, like the Sabbateans, Worship through Corporeality was largely limited to the elite and carefully restrained. The common adherents were taught they may engage it only mildly, through small deeds like earning money to support their leaders.

The complementary opposite of corporeal worship, or the elation of the finite into infinite, is the concept of Hamshacha, "drawing down" or "absorbing", and specifically, Hamshachat ha-Shefa, "absorption of effluence". During spiritual ascension, one could siphon the power animating the higher dimensions down into the material world, where it would manifest as benevolent influence of all kinds. These included spiritual enlightenment, zest in worship and other high-minded aims, but also the more prosaic health and healing, deliverance from various troubles and simple economic prosperity. Thus, a very tangible and alluring motivation to become followers emerged. Both corporeal worship and absorption allowed the masses to access, with common actions, a religious experience once deemed esoteric.

Yet another reflection of the Ein-Yesh dialectic is pronounced in the transformation of evil to goodness and the relations between these two poles and other contradicting elements – including various traits and emotions of the human psyche, like pride and humility, purity and profanity, et cetera. Hasidic thinkers argued that in order to redeem the sparks hidden, one had to associate not merely with the corporeal, but with sin and evil. One example is the elevation of impure thoughts during prayer, transforming them to noble ones rather than repressing them, advocated mainly in the early days of the sect; or "breaking" one's own character by directly confronting profane inclinations. This aspect, once more, had sharp antinomian implications and was used by the Sabbateans to justify excessive sinning. It was mostly toned down in late Hasidism, and even before that, leaders were careful to stress that it was not exercised in the physical sense, but in the contemplative, spiritual one. This kabbalistic notion, too, was not unique to the movement and appeared frequently among other Jewish groups.

=== Righteous One ===
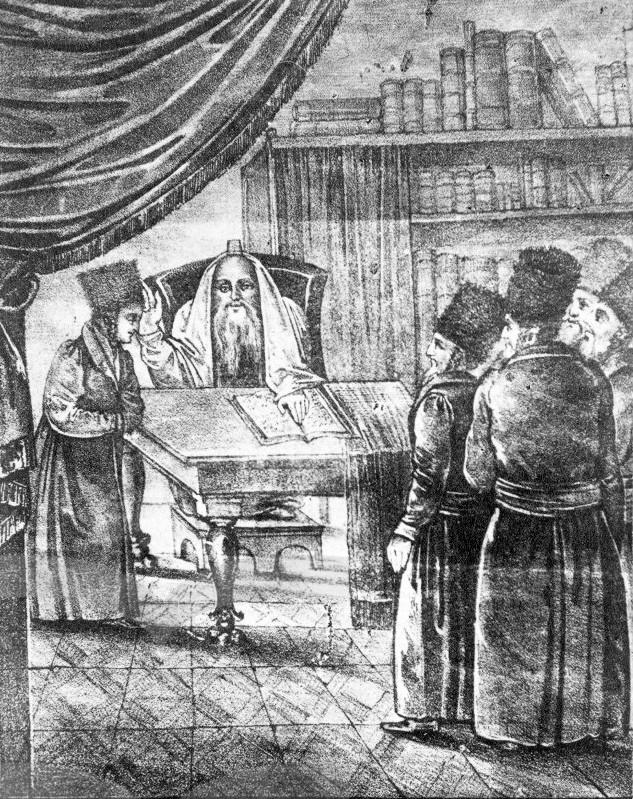
Yisroel Hopstein, a great promulgator of Hasidism in Poland, blessing acolytes c. 1800. Hasidism gave the elite tzadik a social mystical role.

While its mystical and ethical teachings are not easily sharply distinguished from those of other Jewish currents, the defining doctrine of Hasidism is that of the saintly leader, serving both as an ideal inspiration and an institutional figure around whom followers are organized. In the movement's sacral literature, this person is referred to as the tzadik "Righteous One" – often also known by the general honorific Admor (acronym of Hebrew for "our master, teacher and Rabbi"), granted to rabbis in general, or colloquially as Rebbe. The idea that, in every generation, there are righteous persons through whom the divine effluence is drawn to the material world is rooted in the kabbalistic thought, which also claims that one of them is supreme, the reincarnation of Moses. Hasidism elaborated the notion of the tzaddiq into the basis of its entire system – so much that the very term gained an independent meaning within it, apart from the original, which denoted God-fearing, highly observant people.

When the sect began to attract a following and expanded from a small circle of learned disciples to a mass movement, it became evident that its complex philosophy could be imparted only partially to the new rank and file. As even intellectuals struggled with the sublime dialectics of infinity and corporeality, there was little hope of having the common folk truly internalize these, not as mere abstractions to pay lip service to. Ideologues exhorted them to have faith, but the true answer, which marked their rise as a distinct sect, was the concept of the Tzaddiq. A Hasidic master was to serve as a living embodiment of the recondite teachings. He was able to transcend matter, gain spiritual communion, Worship through Corporeality and fulfill all the theoretical ideals. As the vast majority of his flock could not do so themselves, they were to cleave to him instead, acquiring at least some semblance of those vicariously. His commanding and often – especially in the early generations – charismatic presence was to reassure the faithful and demonstrate the truth in Hasidic philosophy by countering doubts and despair. But more than spiritual welfare was concerned: Since it was believed he could ascend to the higher realms, the leader was able to harvest effluence and bring it down upon his adherents, providing them with very material benefits. "The crystallization of that theurgical phase", noted Glenn Dynner, "marked Hasidism's evolution into a full-fledged social movement."

In Hasidic discourse, the willingness of the leader to sacrifice the ecstasy and fulfillment of unity in God was deemed a heavy sacrifice undertaken for the benefit of the congregation. His followers were to sustain and especially to obey him, as he possessed superior knowledge and insight gained through communion. The "descent of the Righteous" (Yeridat ha-Tzaddiq) into the matters of the world was depicted as identical with the need to save the sinners and redeem the sparks concealed in the most lowly places. Such a link between his functions as communal leader and spiritual guide legitimized the political power he wielded. It also prevented a retreat of Hasidic masters into hermitism and passivity, as many mystics before them did. Their worldly authority was perceived as part of their long-term mission to elevate the corporeal world back into divine infinity. To a certain extent, the Saint even fulfilled for his congregation, and for it alone, a limited Messianic capacity in his lifetime. After the Sabbatean debacle, this moderate approach provided a safe outlet for the eschatological urges. At least two leaders radicalized in this sphere and caused severe controversy: Nachman of Breslov, who declared himself the only true Tzaddiq, and Menachem Mendel Schneerson, whom many of his followers believed to be the Messiah. The Rebbes were subject to intense hagiography, even subtly compared with Biblical figures by employing prefiguration. It was argued that since followers could not "negate themselves" sufficiently to transcend matter, they should instead "negate themselves" in submission to the Saint (Hitbatlut la-Tzaddiq), thus bonding with him and enabling themselves to access what he achieved in terms of spirituality. The Righteous served as a mystical bridge, drawing down effluence and elevating the prayers and petitions of his admirers.

The Saintly forged a well-defined relationship with the masses: they provided the latter with inspiration, were consulted in all matters, and were expected to intercede on behalf of their adherents with God and ensure they gained financial prosperity, health and male offspring. The pattern still characterizes Hasidic sects, though prolonged routinization in many turned the Rebbes into de facto political leaders of strong, institutionalized communities. The role of a Saint was obtained by charisma, erudition and appeal in the early days of Hasidism. But by the dawn of the 19th century, the Righteous began to claim legitimacy by descent to the masters of the past, arguing that since they linked matter with infinity, their abilities had to be associated with their own corporeal body. Therefore, it was accepted "there can be no Tzaddiq but the son of a Tzaddiq". Virtually all modern sects maintain this hereditary principle. For example, the Rebbes' families maintain endogamy and marry almost solely with scions of other dynasties.

=== Schools of thought ===
Some Hasidic "courts", and not a few individual prominent masters, developed distinct philosophies with particular accentuation of various themes in the movement's general teachings. Several Hasidic schools had lasting influence over many dynasties, while others died with their proponents. In the doctrinal sphere, the dynasties may be divided along many lines. Some are characterized by Rebbes who are predominantly Torah scholars and poskim "deciders", deriving their authority much like ordinary non-Hasidic rabbis do. Such "courts" emphasize strict observance and study, and are among the most meticulous in the Orthodox world in practice. Prominent examples are the House of Sanz and its scions, such as Satmar and Belz. Other sects, like Vizhnitz, espouse a charismatic-populist line centered on the admiration of the masses for the tzaddik, his effervescent style of prayer and conduct and his purported miracle-working capabilities. Fewer still retain a high proportion of the mystical-spiritualist themes of early Hasidism, encouraging members to study much kabbalistic literature and (carefully) engage in the field. The various Ziditchover dynasties mainly adhere to this philosophy. Others still focus on contemplation and achieving inner perfection. No dynasty is wholly devoted to a single approach to the above; all offer some combination with differing emphasis on each.

Karlin–Stolin, one of the earliest structured Hasidic traditions, emerged under Aharon “the Great” of Karlin in the 1760s and developed a distinctive devotional school marked by unusually intense, vocally expressive prayer and a strong emphasis on penimiyut—inward spiritual work, personal authenticity, and emotional truthfulness. Contemporary leaders often summarize its ethos in a single principle: all aspects of divine service are inward and concealed, except for prayer, which must be expressed outwardly with full force and sincerity. Karlin also preserved one of the oldest and most historically continuous musical traditions in Hasidism; its repertoire of nigunim forms a central pillar of its communal life and has exerted influence on several later dynasties. Courts that emerged from this lineage—including Slonim, Kobrin, Lelev, and Novominsk—retain elements of the Karlin style in their prayer, musical heritage, and communal culture, making it one of the foundational pathways of early Hasidism. The dynasty continues today under the leadership of the Stolin–Karlin Rebbe, who maintains and develops this devotional tradition within modern Hasidic society.

In 1812, a schism occurred between the Yaakov Yitzchak of Lublin, "the Seer", and his prime disciple, Yaakov Yitzchak of Peshischa, the "Holy Jew", due to both personal and doctrinal disagreements. The Seer adopted a populist approach, centered on the tzaddik's theurgical functions to draw the masses. He was famous for his lavish, enthusiastic conduct during prayer and worship, and highly charismatic demeanour. He stressed that as tzaddik, his mission was to influence the common folk by absorbing the Divine Light and satisfying their material needs, thus converting them to his cause and elating them. The Holy Jew pursued a more introspective course, maintaining that the Rebbe's duty was to serve as a spiritual mentor for a more elitist group, helping them to achieve a senseless state of contemplation, aiming to restore man to his oneness with God which Adam supposedly lost when he ate the fruit of the tree of the knowledge of good and evil. The Holy Jew and his successors did neither repudiate miracleworking nor eschew dramatic conduct, but they were much more restrained. The Przysucha School became dominant in Congress Poland, while populist Hasidism resembling the Lublin ethos often prevailed in Kingdom of Galicia and Lodomeria. One extreme and renowned philosopher who emerged from the Przysucha School was Menachem Mendel of Kotzk. Adopting an elitist, hard-line attitude, he openly denounced the folksy nature of other tzaddikim and rejected financial support. Gathering a small group of devout scholars who sought spiritual perfection, whom he often berated and mocked, he always stressed the importance of somberness and totality, stating it was better to be fully wicked than only somewhat good.

Chabad, limited to its namesake dynasty, but prominent, was founded by Shneur Zalman of Liadi and was elaborated by his successors until the late 20th century. The movement retained many of the attributes of early Hasidism, before a clear divide between tzaddik and ordinary followers was cemented. Chabad Rebbes insisted their adherents acquire proficiency in the sect's lore, and not relegate most responsibility to the leaders. The sect emphasizes the importance of intellectually grasping the dynamics of the hidden divine aspect and how they affect the human psyche; the acronym Chabad is for the three penultimate sefirot, associated with the cerebral side of consciousness.

Another famous philosophy is that formulated by Nachman of Breslov and adhered to by Breslov Hasidim. In contrast to most of his peers, who believed that God must be worshiped through the enjoyment of the physical world, Nachman portrayed the corporeal world in grim colours, as a place devoid of God's immediate presence from which the soul yearns to liberate itself. He mocked the attempts to perceive the nature of infinite-finite dialectics and how God still occupies the Vacant Void albeit not, stating these were paradoxical, beyond human understanding. Only naive faith in their reality would do. Mortals constantly struggled to overcome their profane instincts and had to free themselves from their limited intellects to see the world as it truly is.

Tzvi Hirsh of Zidichov, a major Galician tzaddik, was a disciple of the Seer of Lublin, but combined his populist inclination with a strict observance even among his most common followers, and great pluralism in matters of mysticism, as those were eventually emanating from each person's unique soul.

Mordechai Yosef Leiner of Izbica promulgated a radical understanding of free will, which he considered illusory and also derived directly from God. He argued that evil thoughts did not derive from the animalistic soul after attaining a sufficient spiritual level. Sudden urges to transgress revealed Law were God-inspired and may be pursued. This volatile, potentially antinomian doctrine of "Transgression for the Sake of Heaven" is also found in other Hasidic writings, especially from the early period. His successors de-emphasized it in their commentaries. Leiner's disciple Zadok HaKohen of Lublin also developed a complex philosophic system which presented a dialectic nature in history, arguing that significant progress had to be preceded by crisis and calamity.

== Practice and culture ==
=== Rebbe and "court" ===
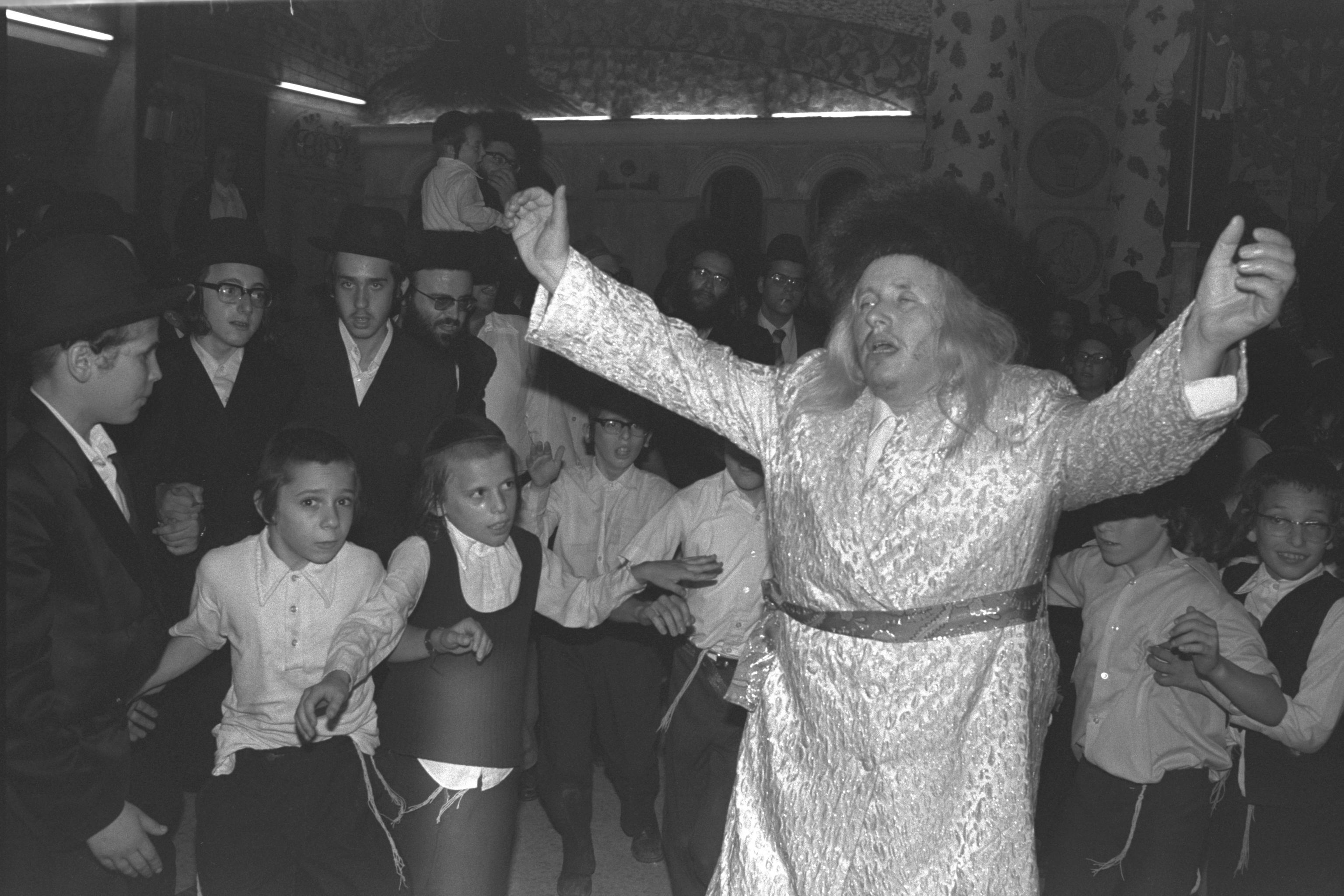
The Kaliver Rebbe, Holocaust survivor, inspiring his court on the festival of Sukkot

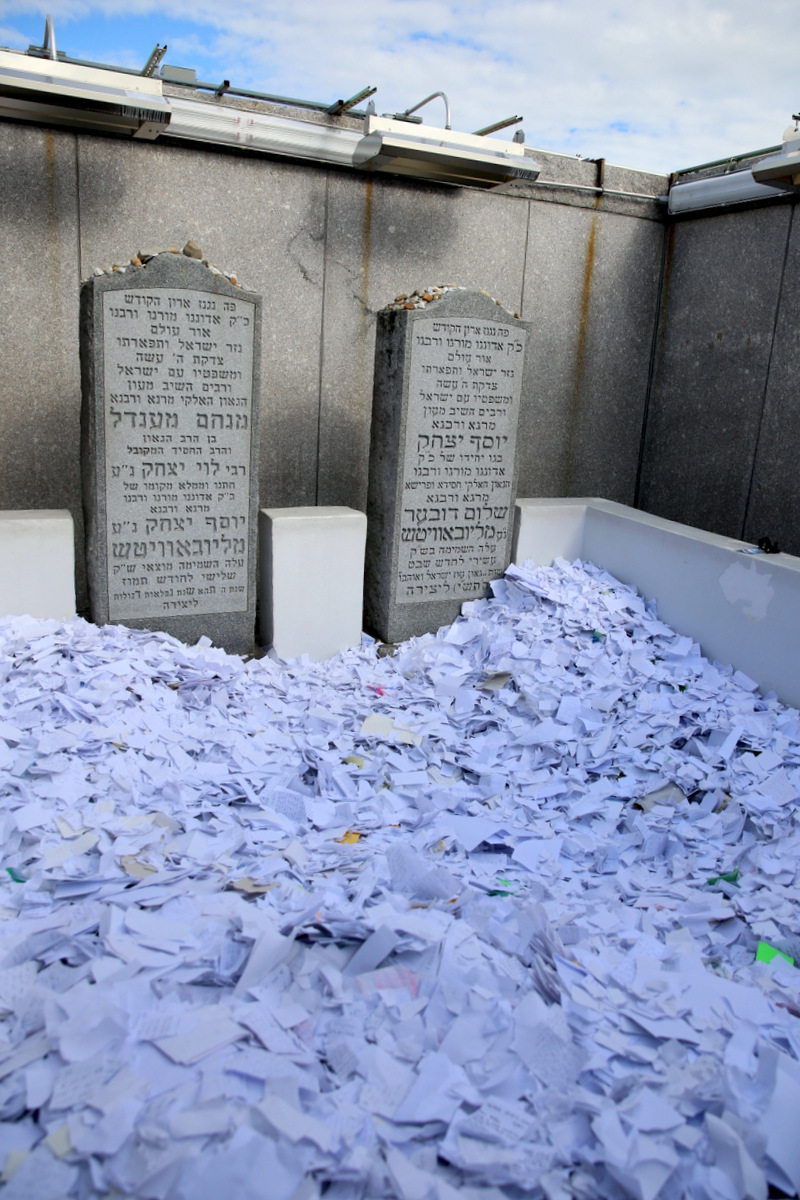
Kvitel requests for blessing piled on the saintly graves of the last Chabad rebbes

The Hasidic community is organized in a sect known as a "court" (Yiddish: הויף, romanized: Hoyf, Galician Yiddish howf; masc). In the movement's early days, a particular rebbe's following usually resided in the same town and their leaders' settlement categorized their Hasidism: a Hasid of Belz, Vizhnitz, and so forth. Later, especially after World War II, the dynasties retained the names of their original Eastern European settlements when moving to the West or Israel. Thus, for example, the Joel Teitelbaum's court in 1905 in Transylvania remained known after its namesake town, Sathmar, even though its headquarters lay in New York, and almost all other Hasidic sects likewise – albeit some groups founded overseas were named accordingly, like the Bostoners.

Akin to his spiritual status, the Rebbe is also the administrative head of the community. Sects often possess linked synagogues (often known as shtiebels), study halls, and internal charity mechanisms, and sufficiently large ones also maintain entire educational systems. The rebbe is the supreme authority figure, not just for the institutions. The rank-and-file Hasidim are also expected to consult with him on important matters and often seek his blessing and advice. He is personally attended by aides known as gabbai or mashbak.

Many particular Hasidic rites surround the leader. On Shabbat, Jewish holidays, and celebratory occasions, rebbes hold a tish "table", a large feast for their male adherents. Together, they sing, dance, and eat, and the head of the sect shakes the hands of his followers to bless them, and often delivers a sermon. A khozer "repeater", selected for his good memory, commits the text to writing after Shabbat (any form of writing during the Sabbath itself being forbidden). In many "courts", the remnants of his meal, supposedly suffused with holiness, are handed out and even fought over. A very large dish is often prepared beforehand, and the rebbe only tastes it before passing it to the crowd. Apart from the gathering at noon, the seudah shlishit of Shabbat and the Melaveh Malkah meal when it ends are also particularly important and an occasion for song, feasting, tales, and sermons. A central custom, which serves as a major factor in the economics of most "courts", is the kvitel, "little note". Adherents submit a written petition, which the master may assist with on behalf of his sanctity, adding money for either tzedakah or the leader's needs. Occasions in the "court" serve as a pretext for mass gatherings, flaunting the power, wealth and size of each. Weddings of the leader's family, for example, are often held with large multistoried stands (פארענטשעס, Parentches) filled with Hasidim surrounding the main floor, where the Rebbe and his relatives dine, celebrate, and perform the Mitzvah tantz. This is a festive dance with the bride: Both parties hold one end of a long sash, a Hasidic gartel, for modesty.

Allegiance to the dynasty and Rebbe is also sometimes a cause for tension. Notable feuds between "courts" include the 1926–1934 strife after Chaim Elazar Spira of Munkatch cursed the deceased Yissachar Dov Rokeach I of Belz; the 1980–2012 Satmar-Belz collision after Yissachar Dov Rokeach II broke with the Orthodox Council of Jerusalem, which culminated when he had to travel in a bulletproof car; and the 2006–present Satmar succession dispute between brothers Aaron Teitelbaum and Zalman Leib Teitelbaum, which saw mass riots.

As in other Haredi groups, apostates may face threats, hostility, violence, and various punitive measures, among them separation of children from their disaffiliated parents, especially in divorce cases. Due to their strictly religious education and traditionalist upbringing, many who leave their sects have few viable work skills or even speak English. Their integration into the broader society is often difficult. The segregated communities are also a comfortable setting for child sexual abuse, and numerous incidents have been reported. While Hasidic leadership has often been accused of silencing the matter, awareness of it is rising within the sects.

Another related phenomenon is the recent rise of mashpi'im "influencers". Once a title for an instructor in Chabad and Breslov only, the institutionalized nature of the established "courts" led many adherents to seek guidance and inspiration from persons who did not declare themselves new leaders, but only mashpi'im. Technically, they fill the original role of rebbes in providing for spiritual welfare; yet, they do not usurp the title, and are therefore countenanced.

=== Liturgy ===
Most Hasidim use some variation of Nusach Sefard, a blend of the liturgies of Nusach Ashkenaz and Nusach Sefard based on the innovations of Isaac Luria. Many dynasties have specific adaptations of Nusach Sefard. The versions of the Belzer, Bobover, and Dushinskier are closer to the Nusach Ashkenaz, while others, such as the Munkacz version, are closer to the Lurianic. Many sects believe that their version reflects Luria's mystical devotions best. The Baal Shem Tov added two segments to Friday services on the eve of Sabbath: Psalm 107 before mincha, and Psalm 23 at the end of maariv.

Hasidim use Ashkenazi Hebrew for liturgical purposes, reflecting their Eastern European background. In their services, wordless, emotional melodies, nigunim are particularly common.

Hasidim lends great importance to kavanah, devotion or intention; their services are long and repetitive. Some courts nearly abolished traditional specified times by which prayers must be conducted (zemanim), to prepare and concentrate. This practice, still enacted in Chabad for one, is controversial in many dynasties, which do follow the specifics of halakha on praying earlier, and not eating beforehand. Chabad uses the permission granted in Jewish law to eat before prayer in certain circumstances, and to have later praying times, as a result of more extended periods of preparatory study and contemplation beforehand. A common saying to explain this (attributed to the Third Chabad Rebbe, Rabbi Menachem Mendel Schneerson I) goes, "Better to eat in order to pray, than to pray in order to eat", implying it is better to eat before prayer if due to the later time of prayers finishing one will be hungry and unable to concentrate properly. Another regulation is daily immersion in a mikveh by men for spiritual cleansing, a rate much higher than is customary for Misnagdim (non-Hasidic Orthodox Jews).

=== Melody ===
Hasidism developed a unique emphasis on the spirituality of nigunim, wordless melodies, as a means to reach devekut during prayer and communal gatherings. Nigunim developed new expressions and depths of the soul in Jewish life, often drawing from folk idioms of the surrounding gentile culture, which were adapted to elevate their concealed sparks of divinity, according to Lurianic Kabbalah.

=== Appearance ===
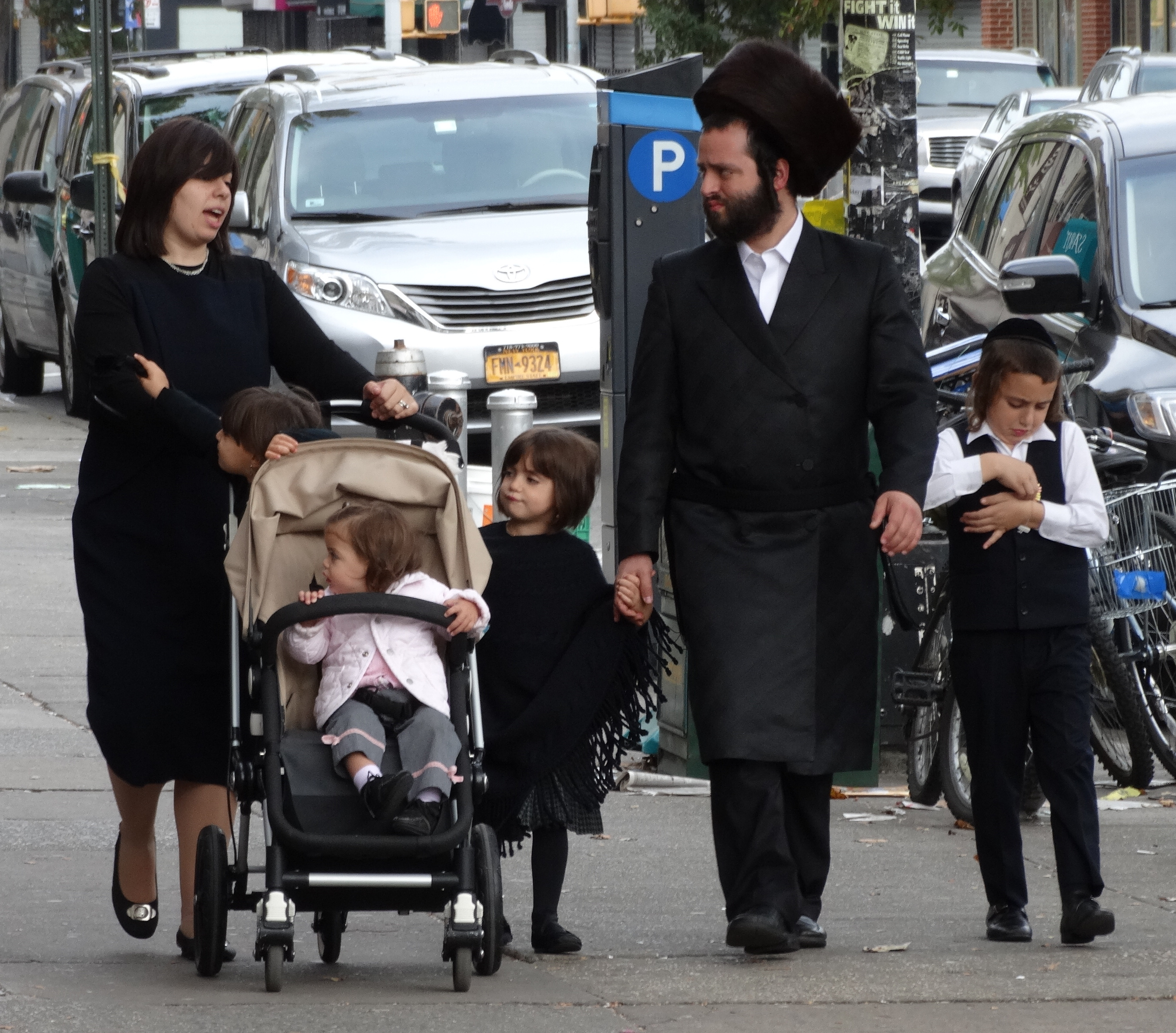
Hasidic family in Borough Park, Brooklyn. The man is wearing a shtreimel, and either a bekishe or a rekel. The woman is wearing a wig, called a sheitel in Yiddish, as according to halakha, she is forbidden to show her hair to anyone outside her immediate family after marriage.

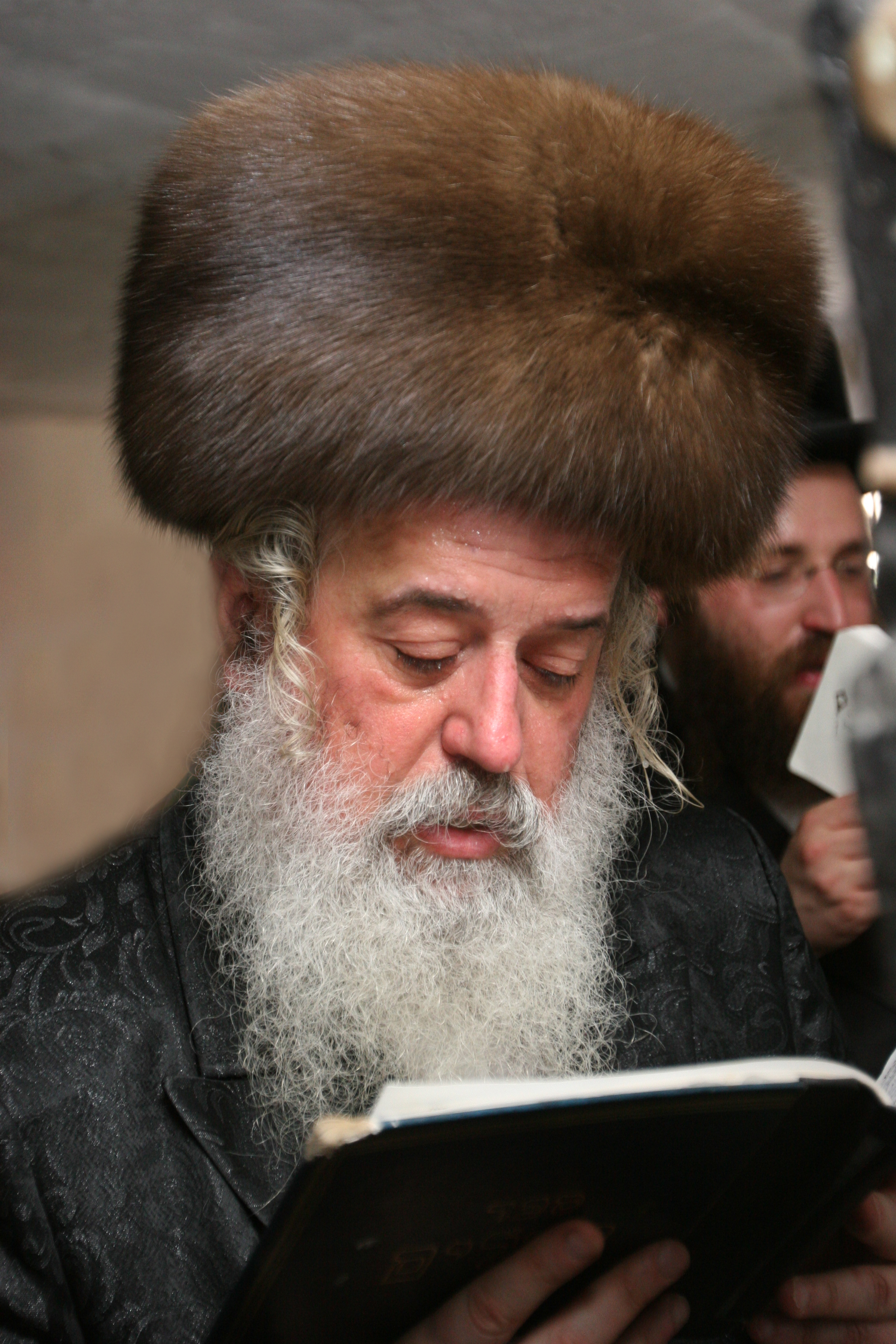
Moshe Leib Rabinovich, the Munkacser rebbe, wearing a kolpik

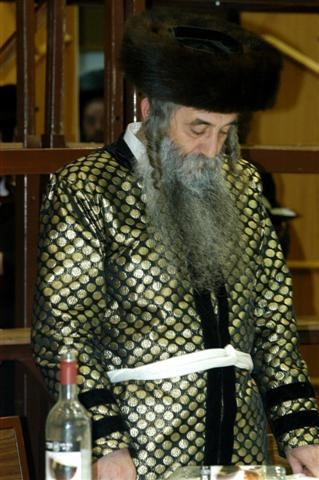
The Dorohoi rebbe in his traditional rabbinical Shabbat garb

Within the Hasidic world, it is possible to distinguish different Hasidic groups by subtle differences in dress. Some details of their dress are shared by non-Hasidic Haredim. Much of Hasidic dress was historically the clothing of all Eastern European Jews, influenced by the style of Polish–Lithuanian nobility. Furthermore, Hasidim have attributed religious origins to specific Hasidic items of clothing.

Hasidic men most commonly wear dark overclothes. On weekdays, they wear a long, black, cloth jacket called a rekel in Yiddish, and on Jewish holidays and Shabbos, the bekéshe and zaydene kapote "silk kaftan", a similarly long, black jacket, but of satin (traditionally silk). Indoors, the colorful tish bekéshe is still worn. Some Hasidim wear a satin overcoat called a radzivulke (after the noble wear of the Polish House of Radziwiłł)

On Shabbat, rebbes traditionally wore a white bekéshe. However, this practice has fallen into disuse among most.

Many wear a black silk bekeshe with velvet trim called strókes piping or samet "samite"; in Hungarian ones, they are gold-embroidered.

Various symbolic and religious qualities are attributed to Hasidic dress, though they are mainly apocryphal as their origin is cultural and historical. For example, bekeshes are modest, the shtreimel is warm but not wool (thus not violating rules of shaatnez). Shabbat shoes are laceless not to have to tie a knot, a rabbinically prohibited activity of Shabbat. A gartel divides the Hasid's lower parts from his upper parts, implying modesty and chastity. For kabbalistic reasons, Hasidim buttoned their clothes right over the left. Hasidic men customarily wear black hats on weekdays, as do nearly all Haredi men today. A variety of hats are worn depending on the group: Chabad men often pinch their hats to form a triangle on the top, Satmar men wear an open-crown hat with rounded edges, and samet "velvet hat" or biber beaver hat are worn by many Galician and Hungarian Hasidic men.

Married Hasidic men don a variety of fur headdresses on the Sabbath, once common among all wedded Eastern European Jewish males and still worn by non-Hasidic Perushim in Jerusalem. The most ubiquitous is the shtreimel, which is seen especially among Galician and Hungarian sects like Satmar or Belz. A taller spodik is donned by Polish dynasties such as Ger. A kolpik is worn by unmarried sons and grandsons of many Rebbes on the Sabbath. Some Rebbes don it on special occasions.

There are many other distinct items of clothing. Such are the Gerrer hoyznzokn – long black socks into which the trousers are tucked. Some Hasidic men from Eastern Galicia wear black socks with their breeches on the Sabbath, as opposed to white ones on weekdays, particularly Belzers.

Following a Biblical commandment not to shave the sides of one's face (Leviticus 19:27), male members of most Hasidic groups wear long, uncut sidelocks called payot. Some Hasidic men shave off the rest of their hair. Not every Hasidic group requires long peyos, and not all Jewish men with peyos are Hasidic, but all Hasidic groups discourage the shaving of one's beard. Most Hasidic boys receive their upsherin ritual, a first haircut, at the age of three years (Skverers do this on boys' second birthday). Until then, Hasidic boys have long hair.

Hasidic women wear clothing adhering to the principles of tznius, modest dress. This includes long conservative skirts, sleeves past the elbow, and covered necklines. Also, women wear stockings to cover their legs; in some Hasidic groups, such as Satmar or Toldos Aharon, the stockings must be opaque. In keeping with halakha, married women wear a head covering, using either a sheytel "wig", tikhl "headscarf", shpitzl "snood", beret, or other hat. In some Hasidic groups, women may wear two headcoverings – a wig and scarf or a wig and hat.

An arrangement of different Orthodox Jewish headgear, such as the fedora and the samet (velvet) styles of hat; ultimately these can be considered derivations of the luxury homburg hat resembling the fin de siècle European gentlemen's fashion.

Public perception of Hasidic Jews is often shaped by visible markers such as dress, language, and communal separation. While these features stand out in modern multicultural cities, they historically reflected widespread Eastern European Jewish norms rather than eccentricities. Scholars note that stereotypes portraying Hasidim as excessively strict, secretive, or irrational usually arise from cultural distance, media portrayals, or a focus on a handful of particularly insular dynasties. In practice, most Hasidic communities function with structured leadership, ordinary family life, stable economic systems, and strong educational values, representing continuity with centuries-old Jewish tradition rather than deviation from it.

=== Families ===
Hasidic Jews, like many other Orthodox Jews, typically produce large families; the average Hasidic family in the United States has 8 children, although it is not uncommon to have 10, 12, or more. This is followed out of a desire to fulfill the Biblical mandate to "be fruitful and multiply" and sometimes specifically to counteract the loss of Jewry during the Holocaust.

=== Languages ===
Most Hasidim speak the language of their countries of residence but use Galician Yiddish among themselves to remain distinct and preserve tradition. Thus, children are still learning Yiddish today, and the language, despite predictions to the contrary, has not died. Yiddish newspapers are still published, and Yiddish fiction is written, primarily aimed at women. Even media in Yiddish is produced both within the Hasidic community and outside it for both educational and entertainment purposes, such as Unorthodox and Shtisel on Netflix as well as support from the Swedish government for Yiddish as one of the official minority languages of Sweden. Some Hasidic groups, such as Satmar and Toldot Aharon, actively oppose the everyday use of Hebrew, which they consider a holy tongue. The use of Hebrew for anything other than prayer and study is, according to them, profane, and so, Yiddish is the vernacular and common tongue for most Hasidim around the world.

=== Literature ===
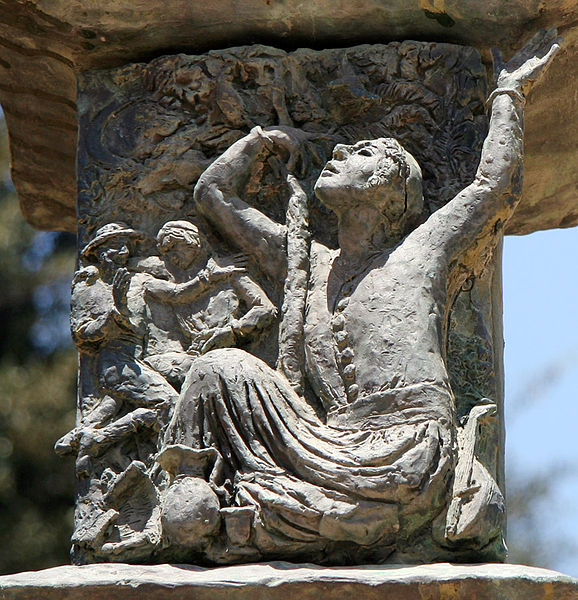
Sculpture of the Hasidic movement's celebration of spirituality on the Knesset Menorah

Hasidic tales are a literary genre, including the hagiographies of various rebbes and moralistic themes. Some are anecdotes or recorded conversations about faith, practice, etc. The most famous tend to be terse and carry a strong and obvious point. They were often transmitted orally, though the earliest compendium is from 1815.

Many revolve around the righteous. The Baal Shem Tov, in particular, was subject to excess hagiography. Characterized by vivid metaphors, miracles, and piety, each reflects the surrounding and era it was composed in. Common themes include dissenting the question what is acceptable to pray for, whether or not the commoner may gain communion, or the meaning of wisdom. The tales were a popular, accessible medium to convey the movement's messages.

In addition to these tales, Hasidim study the numerous mystical/spiritual works of Hasidic philosophy. (Chabad, for example, daily study the Tanya, the Torah Or/Likutei Torah, and the voluminous works of the Rebbes of Chabad; Breslovers study the teachings of Nachman of Breslov, additional to his "tales".) These works draw on the earlier esoteric theology of Kabbalah but articulate this in terms of inner psychological awareness and personal analogies. In addition to its formal, intellectual component, this study thus makes Jewish mysticism accessible and tangible, so that it inspires emotional devekut and embeds a deep spiritual element in daily Jewish life.

== Organization and demographics ==
Hasidic dynasties developed over more than two centuries, beginning with the earliest courts in the late eighteenth century such as Karlin–Stolin, Chernobyl, Chabad, and the circles of Lizhensk and Lublin, each forming its own distinct approach to leadership, spirituality, and communal life. As the movement spread across Eastern Europe, additional dynasties emerged in Galicia, Hungary, Poland, and Romania, creating a diverse landscape of traditions, customs, and philosophies. Today, Hasidic groups differ in prayer style, musical heritage, modes of dress, intellectual emphasis, and communal structure, with each “court” preserving a unique expression of Hasidic identity rooted in its historical origins.

Hasidic dynasties are commonly organized around a hereditary leadership model in which authority is vested in a Rebbe, whose role combines spiritual guide, communal leader, and teacher. Each dynasty forms a “court,” comprising the Rebbe, his family, devoted followers, and institutions such as synagogues, yeshivas, charitable organizations, and communal structures. While leadership often passes from father to son or son-in-law, succession disputes have historically produced splits that resulted in new courts. The size, style, and character of each court vary widely, yet they share the common framework of a charismatic leader surrounded by a community shaped by his interpretation of Hasidic tradition.

The oldest Hasidic dynasties, established in the latter half of the eighteenth century, form the historical core of the movement and continue to influence Hasidic life across all later “courts.” Among the earliest were Karlin–Stolin, founded in the 1760s in Pinsk and known for its intense style of prayer and early missionary activity; Chabad–Lubavitch, founded in the 1770s in present-day Belarus and distinguished by its philosophical, contemplative approach; and the Chernobyl and Lizhensk–Lublin circles, whose numerous branches helped spread Hasidism throughout Ukraine, Poland, and Galicia. These dynasties, along with others such as Berditchev and Amdur, represent the foundational strata of Hasidism and provided the institutional models, liturgical traditions, and leadership styles upon which later courts—large and small—were built. Their continuity from the movement’s earliest decades gives them a central role in defining the historical identity of Hasidism.Karlin–Stolin is often regarded as one of the closest continuations of the earliest Hasidic tradition, preserving the movement’s original prayer intensity, communal independence, and direct lineage from its formative period.

Over the course of the nineteenth century, Hasidism developed several broad regional traditions, shaped by local culture and rabbinic leadership. Hasidim in Lithuania and Belarus tended toward a more intellectual and text-centered style influenced by early Chabad and Karlin–Stolin; those in Central Poland followed the Przysucha–Kotsk tradition with its emphasis on personal authenticity and introspection; Eastern Galicia became known for its charismatic and populist courts such as Belz and Sanz; and the dynasties of Hungary and Transylvania, including Satmar and Sighet, adopted especially conservative communal models. These regional patterns were never absolute, but they created distinct environments in which later dynasties took shape.

The various Hasidic groups may be categorized along several parameters, including their geographical origin, their distinctive teachings, and their inherited communal traditions. These attributes are quite often, but by no means always, correlated, and there are many instances when a "court" espouses a unique combination. Thus, while many dynasties from former Greater Hungary and Galicia developed strongly conservative communal traditions, others — such as Rebbe Yekusiel Yehudah Halberstam’s Sanz-Klausenburg sect — adopted more open and moderate approaches. Several early dynasties — including Karlin–Stolin, Chernobyl, Chabad, and Berditchev, among others, also developed their own distinct communal styles, illustrating the diversity of Hasidic practice from its beginnings. Though Hasidim from Lithuania and Belarus are sometimes associated with an intellectual style, David Assaf noted this perception reflects regional culture more than actual philosophical differences. Apart from those, each "court" often possesses its unique customs, including style of prayer, melodies, particular items of clothing, and the like.

Before the ideological debates of the 20th century, Hasidic communities generally held no unified position toward modern nationalism. Early dynasties such as Karlin–Stolin, Chabad, and the Chernobyl line focused on spiritual practice and communal life rather than political ideology. Modern political categories like Zionism or anti-Zionism developed much later and did not define Hasidic identity during the movement’s formative period.

Hasidic dynasties vary widely in their approaches to Zionism and the modern State of Israel, ranging from cooperative or neutral positions to strongly separatist ones. Among these, some groups such as Toldos Aharon, Bobov and most prominently Satmar, are hostile to the State of Israel, and refuse to participate in the elections there or receive any state funding. They are mainly affiliated with the Edah HaChareidis and the Central Rabbinical Congress. The great majority belong to Agudas Israel, represented in Israel by the United Torah Judaism party. Its Council of Torah Sages now includes a dozen Rebbes. In the past, there were Religious Zionist Rebbes, mainly of the Ruzhin line, alongside individual Rebbes in other courts.

Although Satmar is the most prominent anti-Zionist Hasidic group, this stance is not universal across Hasidism; the majority of dynasties maintain neutral or cooperative relations with the State of Israel.

In 2016, a study conducted by Marcin Wodziński, drawing from the courts' own internal phone-books and other resources, located 129,211 Hasidic households worldwide, about 5% of the estimated total Jewish population. Of those, 62,062 resided in Israel and 53,485 in the United States, 5,519 in Britain and 3,392 in Canada. In Israel, the largest Hasidic concentrations are in the Haredi neighbourhoods of Jerusalem – including Ramot Alon, Batei Ungarin, et cetera – in the cities of Bnei Brak and El'ad, and in the West Bank settlements of Modi'in Illit and Beitar Illit. There is considerable presence in other specifically Orthodox municipalities or enclaves, like Kiryat Sanz, Netanya. In the United States, most Hasidim reside in New York, though there are small communities across the entire country. Brooklyn, particularly the neighborhoods of Borough Park, Williamsburg, and Crown Heights, has an especially large population. Another large population resides in the hamlet of Monsey in the Hudson Valley region of New York; in the same region, New Square and Kiryas Joel are rapidly growing all-Hasidic enclaves, one founded by the Skver dynasty and the other by Satmar. In Britain, Stamford Hill is home to the largest Hasidic community in the country, and there are others in London and Manchester. In Canada, Kiryas Tosh is a settlement populated entirely by Tosh Hasidim, and there are more adherents of other sects in, and around, Montreal.

There are more than a dozen Hasidic dynasties with a large following, and over a hundred which have small or minuscule adherence, sometimes below twenty people, with the presumptive Rebbe holding the title more as a matter of prestige. Many "courts" became completely extinct during the Holocaust, like the Aleksander (Hasidic dynasty) from Aleksandrów Łódzki, which numbered tens of thousands in 1939, and barely exists today.

In the postwar era, Hasidic demographics shifted significantly as communities reestablished themselves in new centers, particularly in Israel and North America.

The largest Hasidic sect, with some 26,000 member households representing a significant share of the global Hasidic population, is Satmar, founded in 1905 in the namesake city in Hungary and based in Williamsburg, Brooklyn, and Kiryas Joel. Other major dynasties such as Ger, Vizhnitz, and Belz also constitute significant global communities and play central roles in contemporary Hasidic life. Satmar is known for its strict traditionalism and strong opposition to both Agudas Israel and Zionism, inspired by the legacy of Hungarian Haredi Judaism. The sect underwent a schism in 2006, and two competing factions emerged, led by rival brothers Aaron Teitelbaum and Zalman Teitelbaum. The second-largest "court" worldwide, with some 11,600 households (or 9% of all Hasidism), is Ger, established in 1859 at Góra Kalwaria, near Warsaw. For decades, it was the dominant power in Agudas, and espoused a moderate line toward Zionism and modern culture. Its origins lay in the rationalist Przysucha School of Central Poland. The current Rebbe is Yaakov Aryeh Alter. The third-largest dynasty is Vizhnitz, a charismatic sect founded in 1854 at Vyzhnytsia, Bukovina. A moderate group involved in Israeli politics, it is split into several branches, which maintain cordial relations. The main partition is between Vizhnitz-Israel and Vizhnitz-Monsey, headed respectively by Rebbes Israel Hager and the eight sons of the late Rebbe Mordecai Hager. In total, all Vizhnitz sub-"courts" constitute over 10,500 households. The fourth major dynasty, with some 7,000 households, is Belz, established 1817 in namesake Belz, north of Lviv. An Eastern Galician dynasty drawing both from the Seer of Lublin's charismatic-populist style and "rabbinic" Hasidism, it espoused hard-line positions, but broke off from the Edah HaChareidis and joined Agudas in 1979. Belz is led by Rebbe Yissachar Dov Rokeach.

The Bobover dynasty, founded 1881 in Bobowa, West Galicia, constitutes some 4,500 households in total, and has undergone a bitter succession strife since 2005, eventually forming the "Bobov" (3,000 households) and "Bobov-45" (1,500 households) sects. Sanz-Klausenburg, divided into a New York and Israeli branches, presides over 3,800 households. The Skver sect, established in 1848 in Skvyra, near Kyiv, constitutes 3,300. The Shomer Emunim dynasties, originating in Jerusalem during the 1920s and known for their unique style of dressing imitating that of the Old Yishuv, have over 3,000 families, almost all in the larger "courts" of Toldos Aharon and Toldos Avraham Yitzchak. Karlin Stolin, which rose already in the 1760s in a quarter of Pinsk, encompasses 2,200 families.

There are two other populous Hasidic sub-groups, which do not function as classical Rebbe-headed "courts", but as de-centralized movements, retaining some of the characteristics of early Hasidism. Breslov rose under its charismatic leader Nachman of Breslov in the early 19th century. Critical of all other Rebbes, he forbade his followers to appoint a successor upon his death in 1810. His acolytes led small groups of adherents, persecuted by other Hasidim, and disseminated his teachings. The original philosophy of the sect elicited great interest among modern scholars, and that led many newcomers to Orthodox Judaism ("repentants") to join it. Numerous Breslov communities, each led by its own rabbis, now have thousands of full-fledged followers, and far more admirers and semi-committed supporters; Marcin Wodziński estimated that the fully committed population of Breslovers may be estimated at 7,000 households. Chabad-Lubavitch, originating in the 1770s, did have hereditary leadership, but always stressed the importance of self-study, rather than reliance on the Righteous. Its seventh, and last, leader, Menachem Mendel Schneerson, converted it into a vehicle for Jewish outreach. By his death in 1994, it had many more semi-engaged supporters than Hasidim in the strict sense, and they are still hard to distinguish. Chabad's own internal phone-books list some 16,800 member households. None succeeded Schneerson, and the group operates as a large network of communities with independent leaders.

== History ==
=== Background ===
In the late 17th century, several social trends converged among the Jews who inhabited the southern periphery of the Polish–Lithuanian Commonwealth, especially in the present-day Western Ukraine. These enabled the emergence and flourishing of Hasidism.

The first, and most prominent, was the popularization of the mystical lore of Kabbalah. For several centuries, an esoteric teaching practiced surreptitiously by few, it was transformed into almost household knowledge by a mass of cheap printed pamphlets. The kabbalistic inundation was a major influence behind the rise of the heretical Sabbatean movement, led by Sabbatai Zevi, who declared himself Messiah in 1665. The propagation of Kabbalah made the Jewish masses susceptible to Hasidic ideas, themselves, in essence, a popularized version of the teaching – indeed, Hasidism actually emerged when its founders determined to openly practice it, instead of remaining a secret circle of ascetics, as was the manner of almost all past kabbalists. The correlation between publicizing the lore and Sabbateanism did not escape the rabbinic elite, and caused vehement opposition to the new movement.

Another factor was the decline of the traditional authority structures. Jewish autonomy remained quite secured; later research debunked Simon Dubnow's claim that the Council of Four Lands' demise in 1746 was a culmination of a long process which destroyed judicial independence and paved the way for the Hasidic rebbes to serve as leaders (another long-held explanation for the sect's rise advocated by Raphael Mahler, that the Khmelnytsky Uprising effected economic impoverishment and despair, was also refuted. However, the magnates and nobles held much sway over the nomination of both rabbis and communal elders, to such a degree that the masses often perceived them as mere lackeys of the land owners. Their ability to serve as legitimate arbiters in disputes – especially those concerning the regulation of leasehold rights over alcohol distillation and other monopolies in the estates – was severely diminished. The reduced prestige of the establishment, and the need for an alternative source of authority to pass judgement, left a vacuum which Hasidic charismatics eventually filled. They transcended old communal institutions, to which all the Jews of a locality were subordinate, and had groups of followers in each town across vast territories. Often supported by rising strata outside the traditional elite, whether nouveau riche or various low-level religious functionaries, they created a modern form of leadership.

Historians discerned other influences. The formative age of Hasidism coincided with the rise of numerous religious revival movements across the world, including the First Great Awakening in New England, Wahhabism in the Arabian Peninsula, German Pietism and the Russian Old Believers who opposed the established church. Hasidism rejected the existing order, decrying it as stale and overly hierarchic. They offered what they described as more spiritual, candid, and simple substitutes. Gershon David Hundert noted the considerable similarity between the Hasidic conceptions and this contemporary background, rooted in the growing importance attributed to the individual's consciousness and choices.

Medieval Forebears

The Hasidic movement of the 18th century is related to the tradition of the early German Hasidim of the 9th-13th centuries by way of the medieval tradition of Kabbalah which came to Europe partly way of this group. Exemplary figures of this tradition include: Kalonymus, Samuel of Speyer, Judah ben Samuel (of Speyer) of Regensburg, aka. Judah the Pious, Eleazar of Worms etc. The Hasidim of the Early and Late masters in Eastern Europe and their legacy in the longer Hasidic tradition—what is generally referred to as Hasidic Judaism—may otherwise be seen as a distinct and much later phenomena vs. the German Hasidim.

=== Israel ben Eliezer ===
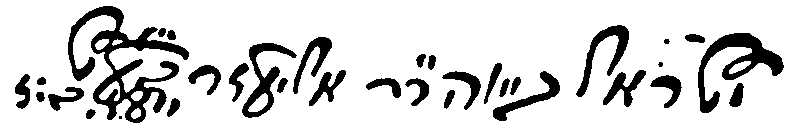
Israel ben Eliezer's autograph

Israel ben Eliezer (ca. 1698–1760), known as the Baal Shem Tov ("Master of the Good Name", acronym: "Besht"), is considered the founder of Hasidism. Supposedly born south of the Prut, in the northern frontier of Moldavia, he earned a reputation as a Baal Shem, "Master of the Name". These were common folk healers who employed mysticism, amulets and incantations as their trade. Little is known for certain about Israel ben Eliezer. Though not a scholar, he was sufficiently learned to become notable in the communal hall of study and marry into the rabbinic elite, his wife being the divorced sister of a rabbi; in his later years, he became wealthy and famous, as attested by contemporary chronicles. Apart from that, most information about him is derived from Hasidic hagiographic accounts. These claim that as a boy he was recognized by one "Rabbi Adam Baal Shem Tov" who entrusted him with great secrets of the Torah, passed in his illustrious family for centuries; that the Besht later spent a decade in the Carpathian Mountains as a hermit, where he was visited by the Biblical prophet Ahijah the Shilonite who taught him more; and that at the age of thirty-six, he was granted heavenly permission to reveal himself as a great kabbalist and miracle worker.

By the 1740s, it is verified that he relocated to the town of Medzhybizh and became recognized and popular in Podolia and beyond. It is well attested that he emphasized several known kabbalistic concepts, formulating his own teachings to some degree. The Besht stressed the immanence of God and His presence in the material world, and that therefore, physical acts, such as eating, have an actual influence on the spiritual sphere and may serve to hasten the achievement of communion with the divine (devekut). He was known to pray ecstatically and with great intention, in order to provide channels for the divine light to flow into the Earthly realm. The Besht stressed the importance of joy and contentment in the worship of God, rather than the abstinence and self-mortification deemed essential to becoming a pious mystic, and of fervent and vigorous prayer as a means of spiritual elation instead of severe asceticism, but many of his immediate disciples reverted in part to the older doctrines, especially in disavowing sexual pleasure even in marital relations.

In that, the "Besht" laid the foundation for a popular movement, offering a far less rigorous course for the masses to gain a significant religious experience. And yet, he remained the guide of a small society of elitists, in the tradition of former kabbalists, and never led a large public as his successors did. While many later figures cited him as the inspiration behind the full-fledged Hasidic doctrine, the Besht himself did not practice it in his lifetime.

=== Consolidation ===
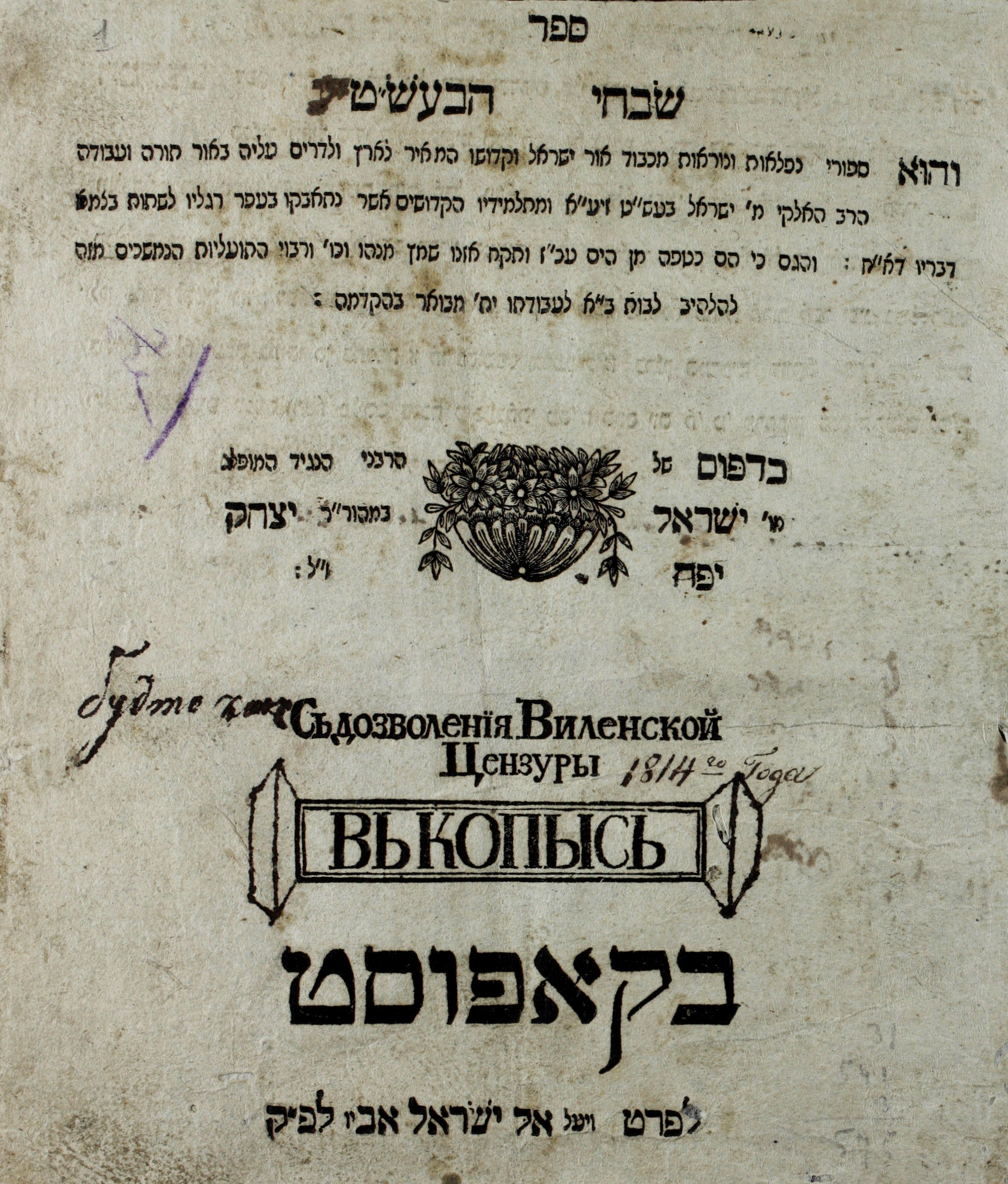
Shivchei HaBesht (Praises of the Baal Shem Tov), the first compilation of Hasidic hagiographic storytelling, was printed from manuscripts in 1815.

Israel ben Eliezer gathered a considerable following, drawing to himself disciples from far away. They were largely of elitist background, yet adopted the populist approach of their master. The most prominent was Rabbi Dov Ber the Maggid (preacher). He succeeded the former upon his death, though other important acolytes, mainly Jacob Joseph of Polonne, did not accept his leadership. Establishing himself in Mezhirichi, the Maggid turned to greatly elaborate the Besht's rudimentary ideas and institutionalize the nascent circle into an actual movement. Ben Eliezer and his acolytes used the very old and common epithet Hasidim, "pious"; in the latter third of the 18th century, a clear differentiation arose between that sense of the word and what was at first described as "New Hasidism", propagated to a degree by the Maggid and especially his successors.

Doctrine coalesced as Jacob Joseph, Dov Ber, and the latter's disciple, Rabbi Elimelech of Lizhensk, composed the three magna opera of early Hasidism, respectively: the 1780 Toldot Ya'akov Yosef, the 1781 Maggid d'varav le-Ya'akov, and the 1788 No'am Elimelekh. Other books were also published. Their new teaching had many aspects. The importance of devotion in prayer was stressed to such degree that many waited beyond the prescribed time to properly prepare; the Besht's recommendation to "elevate and sanctify" impure thoughts, rather than simply repress them during the service, was expanded by Dov Ber into an entire precept, depicting prayer as a mechanism to transform thoughts and feelings from a primal to a higher state in a manner parallel to the unfolding of the Sephirot. But the most important was the notion of the Tzaddiq – later designated by the general rabbinic honorific Admor (our master, teacher, and rabbi) or by the colloquial Rebbe – the Righteous One, the mystic who was able to elate and achieve communion with the divine, but, unlike kabbalists past, did not practice it in secret, but as leader of the masses. He was able to bring down prosperity and guidance from the higher Sephirot, and the common people who could not attain such a state themselves would achieve it by "clinging" to and obeying him. The Tzaddiq served as a bridge between the spiritual realm and the ordinary folk, as well as a simple, understandable embodiment of the esoteric teachings of the sect, which were still beyond the reach of most just as old-style Kabbalah before.

The various Hasidic Tzaddiqim, mainly the Maggid's disciples, spread across Eastern Europe with each gathering adherents among the people and learned acolytes who could be initiated as leaders. The Righteous' "courts" in which they resided, attended by their followers to receive blessing and council, became the institutional centers of Hasidism, serving as its branches and organizational core. Slowly, various rites emerged in them, like the Sabbath Tisch or "table", in which the Righteous would hand out food scraps from their meals, considered blessed by the touch of ones imbued with godly Light during their mystical ascensions. Another potent institution was the Shtibel, the private prayer gatherings opened by adherents in every town which served as a recruiting mechanism. The Shtibel differed from the established synagogues and study halls, allowing their members greater freedom to worship when they pleased, and also serving recreational and welfare purposes. Combined with its simplified message, more appealing to the common man, its honed organizational framework accounted for the exponential growth of Hasidic ranks. Having ousted the old communal model, and replaced it with a less-hierarchical structure and more individually-oriented religiosity, Hasidism was, in fact, the first great modern – albeit not modernist; its self-understanding was grounded in a traditional mindset – Jewish movement.

From its original base in Podolia and Volhynia, the movement was rapidly disseminated during the Maggid's lifetime, and after his 1772 death. Twenty or so of Dov Ber's prime disciples each brought it to a different region, and their own successors followed: Aharon of Karlin (I), Menachem Mendel of Vitebsk, and Shneur Zalman of Liadi were the emissaries to the former Lithuania in the far north, while Menachem Nachum Twersky headed to Chernobyl in the east, and Levi Yitzchok of Berditchev remained nearby. Elimelech of Lizhensk, his brother Zusha of Hanipol, and Yisroel Hopsztajn established the sect in Poland proper. Vitebsk and Abraham Kalisker later led a small group of followers to Ottoman Palestine, establishing a Hasidic presence in the Galilee.

The spread of Hasidism also incurred organized opposition. Rabbi Elijah of Vilnius, one of the greatest authorities of the generation and a hasid and secret kabbalist of the old style, was deeply suspicious of their emphasis on mysticism, rather than mundane Torah study, threat to established communal authority, resemblance to the Sabbatean movement, and other details he considered infractions. In April 1772, he and the Vilnius community wardens launched a systematic campaign against the sect, placing an anathema upon them, banishing their leaders, and sending letters denouncing the movement. Further excommunication followed in Brody and other cities. In 1781, during a second round of hostilities, the books of Jacob Joseph were burned in Vilnius. Another cause for strife emerged when the Hasidim adopted the Lurianic prayer rite, which they revised somewhat to Nusach Sefard; the first edition in Eastern Europe was printed in 1781 and received approbation from the anti-Hasidic scholars of Brody, but the sect quickly embraced the Kabbalah-infused tome and popularized it, making it their symbol. Their rivals, named Misnagdim, "opponents" (a generic term which acquired an independent meaning as Hasidism grew stronger), soon accused them of abandoning the traditional Nusach Ashkenaz.

In 1798, Opponents made accusations of espionage against Shneur Zalman of Liadi, and he was imprisoned by the Russian government for two months. Excoriatory polemics were printed and anathemas declared in the entire region. But Elijah's death in 1797 denied the Misnagdim their powerful leader. In 1804, Alexander I of Russia allowed independent prayer groups to operate, the chief vessel through which the movement spread from town to town. The failure to eradicate Hasidism, which acquired a clear self-identity in the struggle and greatly expanded throughout it, convinced its adversaries to adopt a more passive method of resistance, as exemplified by Chaim of Volozhin. The growing conservatism of the new movement – which at some occasions drew close to Kabbalah-based antinomian phraseology, as did the Sabbateans, but never crossed the threshold and remained thoroughly observant – and the rise of common enemies slowly brought a rapprochement, and by the second half of the 19th century, both sides basically considered each other legitimate.

The turn of the century saw several prominent new, fourth generation tzaddiqim. Upon Elimelech's death in the now-partitioned Poland, his place in Habsburg Galicia was assumed by Menachem Mendel of Rimanov, who was deeply hostile to the modernization the Austrian rulers attempted to force on the traditional Jewish society (though this same process also allowed his sect to flourish, as communal authority was severely weakened). The rabbi of Rimanov hearkened the alliance the Hasidim would form with the most conservative elements of the Jewish public. In Central Poland, the new leader was Jacob Isaac Horowiz, the "Seer of Lublin", who was of a particularly populist bent and appealed to the common folk with miracle working and little strenuous spiritual demands. The Seer's senior acolyte, Jacob Isaac Rabinovitz, the "Holy Jew" of Przysucha, gradually dismissed his mentor's approach as overly vulgar, and adopted a more aesthetic and scholarly approach, virtually without theurgy to the masses. The Holy Jew's "Przysucha School" was continued by his successor Simcha Bunim, and especially the reclusive, morose Menachem Mendel of Kotzk. The most controversial fourth generation tzaddiq was the Podolia-based Nachman of Breslov, who denounced his peers for becoming too institutionalized, much like the old establishment their predecessors challenged decades before, and espoused an anti-rationalist, pessimistic spiritual teaching, very different from the prevalent stress on joy.

=== Routinization ===
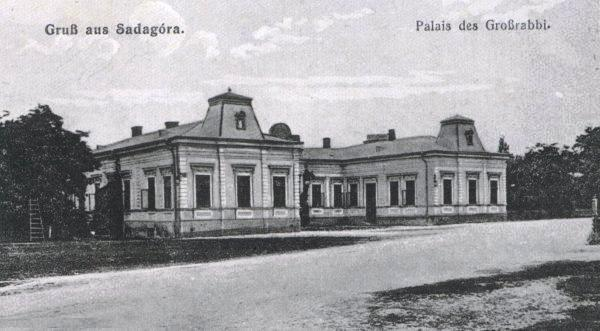
Palace of the Ruzhin dynasty, known for its "royal" mannerism, in Sadhora

The opening of the 19th century saw the Hasidic sect transformed. Once a rising force outside the establishment, the tzaddiqim now became an important and often dominant power in most of Eastern Europe. The slow process of encroachment, which mostly begun with forming an independent Shtibel and culminated in the Righteous becoming an authority figure (either alongside or above the official rabbinate) for the entire community, overwhelmed many towns even in Misnagdic stronghold of Lithuania, far more so in Congress Poland and the vast majority in Podolia, Volhynia and Galicia. It began to make inroads into Bukovina, Bessarabia and the westernmost frontier of autochthonic pre-WWII Hasidism, in northeastern Hungary, where the Seer's disciple Moses Teitelbaum (I) was appointed in Ujhely.

Less than three generations after the Besht's death, the sect grew to encompass hundreds of thousands by 1830. As a mass movement, a clear stratification emerged between the court's functionaries and permanent residents (yoshvim, "sitters"), the devoted followers who would often visit the Righteous on Sabbath, and the large public which prayed at Sefard Rite synagogues and was minimally affiliated.

All this was followed by a more conservative approach and power bickering among the Righteous. Since the Maggid's death, none could claim the overall leadership. Among the several dozen active, each ruled over his own turf, and local traditions and customs began to emerge in the various courts which developed their own identity. The high mystical tension typical of a new movement subsided, and was soon replaced by more hierarchical, orderly atmosphere.

The most important aspect of the routinization Hasidism underwent was the adoption of dynasticism. The first to claim legitimacy by right of descent from the Besht was his grandson, Boruch of Medzhybizh, appointed 1782. He held a lavish court with Hershel of Ostropol as jester and demanded the other Righteous acknowledge his supremacy. Upon the death of Menachem Nachum Twersky of Chernobyl, his son Mordechai Twersky succeeded him. The principle was conclusively affirmed in the great dispute after Liadi's demise in 1813: his senior acolyte Aharon HaLevi of Strashelye was defeated by his son, Dovber Schneuri, whose offspring retained the title for 181 years.

By the 1860s, virtually all courts were dynastic. Rather than single tzaddiqim with followings of their own, each sect would command a base of rank-and-file Hasidim attached not just to the individual leader, but to the bloodline and the court's unique attributes. Israel Friedman of Ruzhyn insisted on royal splendour, resided in a palace and his six sons all inherited some of his followers. With the constraints of maintaining their gains replacing the dynamism of the past, the Righteous or Rebbes/Admorim also silently retreated from the overt, radical mysticism of their predecessors. While populist miracle working for the masses remained a key theme in many dynasties, a new type of "Rebbe-Rabbi" emerged, one who was both a completely traditional halakhic authority as well as a spiritualist. The tension with the Misnagdim subsided significantly.

But it was an external threat, more than anything else, that mended relations. While traditional Jewish society remained well entrenched in backward Eastern Europe, reports of the rapid acculturation and religious laxity in the West troubled both camps. When the Haskalah, the Jewish Enlightenment, appeared in Galicia and Congress Poland in the 1810s, it was soon perceived as a dire threat. The maskilim themselves detested Hasidism as an anti-rationalist and barbaric phenomenon, as did Western Jews of all shades, including the most right-wing Orthodox such as Rabbi Azriel Hildesheimer. In Galicia especially, hostility towards it defined the Haskalah to a large extent, from the staunchly observant Rabbi Zvi Hirsch Chajes and Joseph Perl to the radical anti-Talmudists like Osias Schorr. The Enlightened, who revived Hebrew grammar, often mocked their rivals' lack of eloquence in the language. While a considerable proportion of the Misnagdim were not averse to at least some of the Haskala's goals, the Rebbes were unremittingly hostile.

The most distinguished Hasidic leader in Galicia in the era was Chaim Halberstam, who combined Talmudic erudition and the status of a major decisor with his function as tzaddiq. He symbolized the new era, brokering peace between the small Hasidic sect in Hungary to its opponents. In that country, where modernization and assimilation were much more prevalent than in the East, the local Righteous joined forces with those now termed Orthodox against the rising liberals. Rabbi Moses Sofer of Pressburg, while no friend to Hasidism, tolerated it as he combated the forces which sought modernization of the Jews; a generation later, in the 1860s, the Rebbes and the zealot Haredi rabbi Hillel Lichtenstein allied closely.

Around the mid-19th century, over a hundred dynastic courts related by marriage were the main religious power in the territory enclosed between Hungary, former Lithuania, Prussia and inner Russia, with considerable presence in the former two. In Central Poland, the pragmatist, rationalist Przysucha school thrived: Yitzchak Meir Alter founded the court of Ger in 1859, and in 1876 Jechiel Danziger established Alexander. In Galicia and Hungary, apart from Halberstam's House of Sanz, Tzvi Hirsh of Zidichov's descendants each pursued a mystical approach in the dynasties of Zidichov, Komarno and so forth. In 1817, Sholom Rokeach became the first Rebbe of Belz. At Bukovina, the Hager line of Kosov-Vizhnitz was the largest court.

The Haskalah was always a minor force, but the Jewish national movements which emerged in the 1880s, as well as Socialism, proved much more appealing to the young. Progressive strata condemned Hasidism as a primitive relic, strong, but doomed to disappear, as Eastern European Jewry underwent slow yet steady secularization. The gravity of the situation was attested to by the foundation of Hasidic yeshivas (in the modern, boarding school-equivalent sense) to enculturate the young and preserve their loyalty: The first was established at Nowy Wiśnicz by Rabbi Shlomo Halberstam (I) in 1881. These institutions were originally utilized by the Misnagdim to protect their youth from Hasidic influence, but now, the latter faced a similar crisis. One of the most contentious issues in this respect was Zionism; the Ruzhin dynasties were quite favourably disposed toward it, while Hungarian and Galician courts reviled it.

=== Calamity and renaissance ===
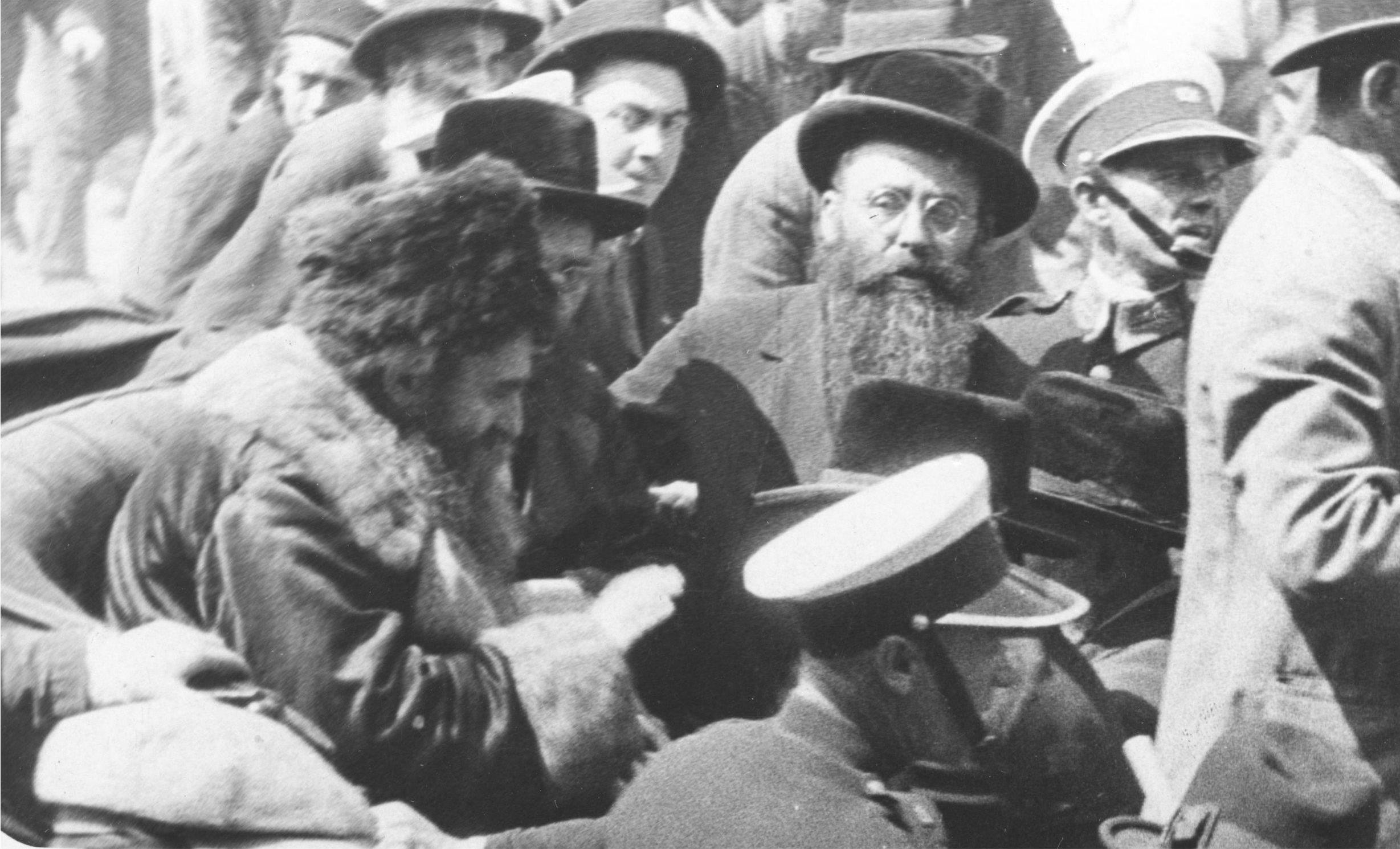
Belzer Rebbe Aharon Rokeach (depicted 1934), of the Belz Hasidic dynasty, who was hidden from the Nazis and smuggled out of Europe

Outside pressure was mounting in the early 20th century. In 1912, many Hasidic leaders partook in the creation of the Agudas Israel party, a political instrument intended to safeguard what was now named Orthodox Judaism even in the relatively traditional East; the more hardline dynasties, mainly Galician and Hungarian, opposed the Aguda as "too lenient". Mass immigration to America, urbanization, World War I, and the subsequent Russian Civil War uprooted the shtetls in which the local Jews had lived for centuries, and which were the bedrock of Hasidism. In the new Soviet Union, civil equality first achieved and a harsh repression of religion caused a rapid secularization. Few remaining Hasidim, especially of Chabad, continued to practice underground for decades. In the new states of the Interbellum era, the process was only somewhat slower. On the eve of World War II, strictly observant Jews were estimated to constitute no more than a third of the total Jewish population in Poland, the world's most Orthodox country. While the Rebbes still had a vast base of support, it was aging and declining.

The Holocaust hit the Hasidim particularly hard because they were easily identifiable and because they were almost unable to disguise themselves among the larger populace due to cultural insularity. Hundreds of leaders perished with their flocks, while the flight of many notable ones as their followers were being exterminated – especially Aharon Rokeach of Belz and Joel Teitelbaum of Satmar – elicited bitter recrimination. In the immediate post-war years, the entire movement seemed to teeter on the precipice of oblivion. In Israel, the United States, and Western Europe, the survivors' children were at best becoming Modern Orthodox. While a century earlier, the Haskalah depicted it as a medieval, malicious power, now, it was so weakened that the popular cultural image was sentimental and romantic, what Joseph Dan termed "Frumkinian Hasidism", for it began with the short stories of Michael Levi Rodkinson (Frumkin). Martin Buber was the major contributor to this trend, portraying the sect as a model of a healthy folk consciousness. "Frumkinian" style was very influential, later inspiring the so-called "Neo-Hasidism", and also utterly ahistorical.

Yet, the movement proved resilient. Talented and charismatic Hasidic masters emerged, who reinvigorated their following and drew new crowds. In New York, the Satmar Rebbe Joel Teitelbaum formulated a fiercely anti-Zionist Holocaust theology and founded an insular, self-sufficient community which attracted many immigrants from Greater Hungary. By 1961, 40% of families were newcomers. Yisrael Alter of Ger created robust institutions, fortified his court's standing in Agudas Israel, and held tisch every week for 29 years. He halted the hemorrhage of his followers, and retrieved many Litvaks (the contemporary, less adverse epithet for Misnagdim) and Religious Zionists whose parents were Gerrer Hasidim before the war. Chaim Meir Hager similarly restored Vizhnitz. Moses Isaac Gewirtzman founded the new Pshevorsk (Hasidic dynasty) in Antwerp.

The most explosive growth was experienced in Chabad-Lubavitch, whose head, Menachem Mendel Schneerson, adopted a modern (he and his disciples ceased wearing the customary Shtreimel) and outreach-centered orientation. At a time when most Orthodox Jews, and Hasidim in particular, rejected proselytization, he turned his sect into a mechanism devoted almost solely to it, blurring the difference between actual Hasidim and loosely affiliated supporters until researchers could scarcely define it as a regular Hasidic group. Another phenomenon was the revival of Breslov, which remained without an acting Tzaddiq since the rebellious Rebbe Nachman's 1810 death. Its complex, existentialist philosophy drew many to it.

High fertility rates, increasing tolerance and multiculturalism on the part of surrounding society, and the great wave of newcomers to Orthodox Judaism which began in the 1970s all cemented the movement's status as thriving. The clearest indication for that, noted Joseph Dan, was the disappearance of the "Frumkinian" narrative which inspired much sympathy towards it from non-Orthodox Jews and others, as actual Hasidism returned to the fore. It was replaced by apprehension and concern due to the growing presence of the reclusive, strictly religious Hasidic lifestyle in the public sphere, especially in Israel. As numbers grew, "courts" were again torn apart by schisms between Rebbes' sons vying for power, a common occurrence during the golden age of the 19th century.

== See also ==
- Kiryas Joel, New York − majority Hasidic village
- New Square, New York − an all-Hasidic village
- Kaser, New York − an all-Hasidic village
- Kiryas Tosh, Quebec − an all-Hasidic community in Quebec, Canada
- Jewish fundamentalism
