= Gartel =

Jewish clothing article

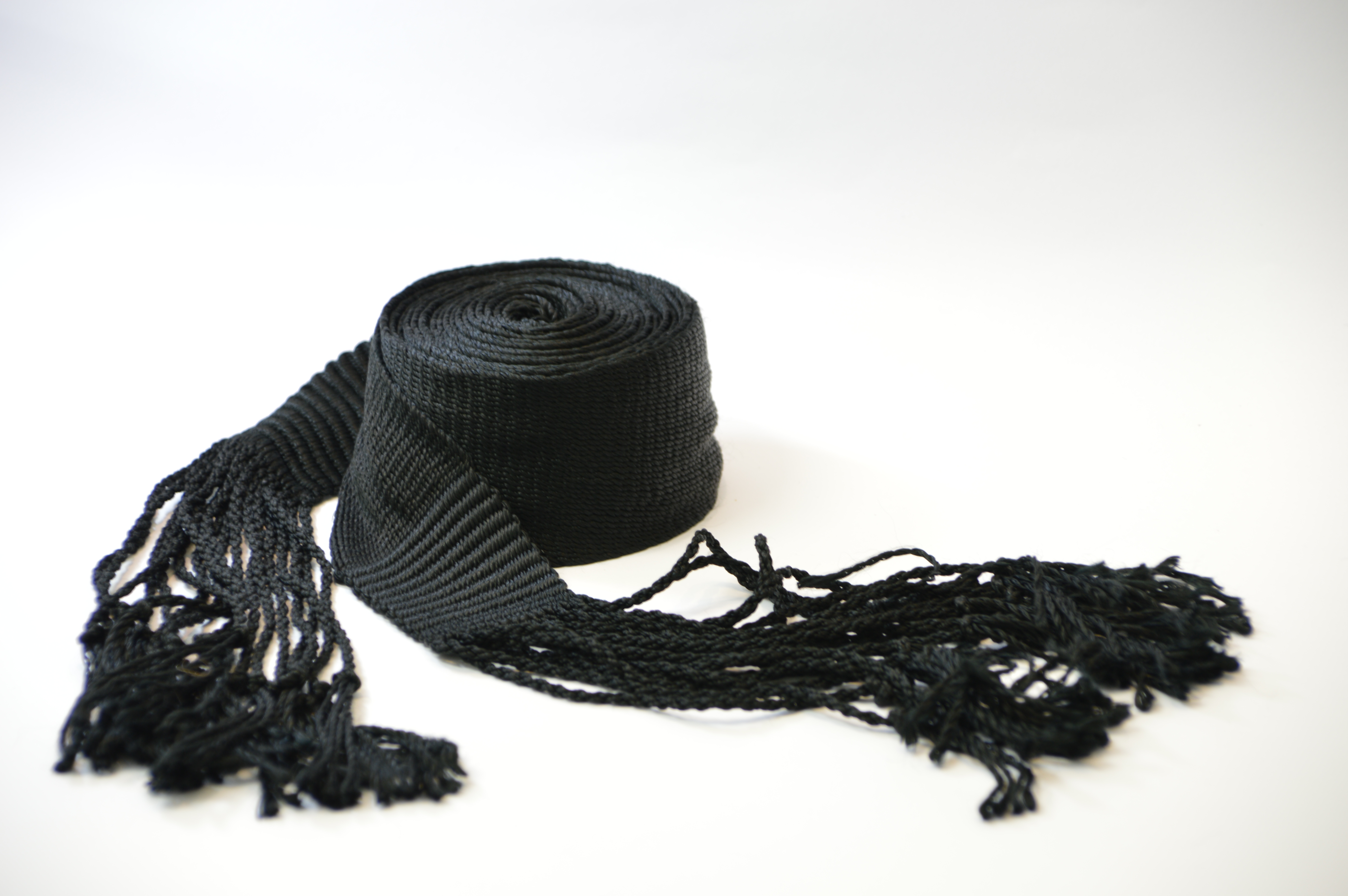
Silk gartel

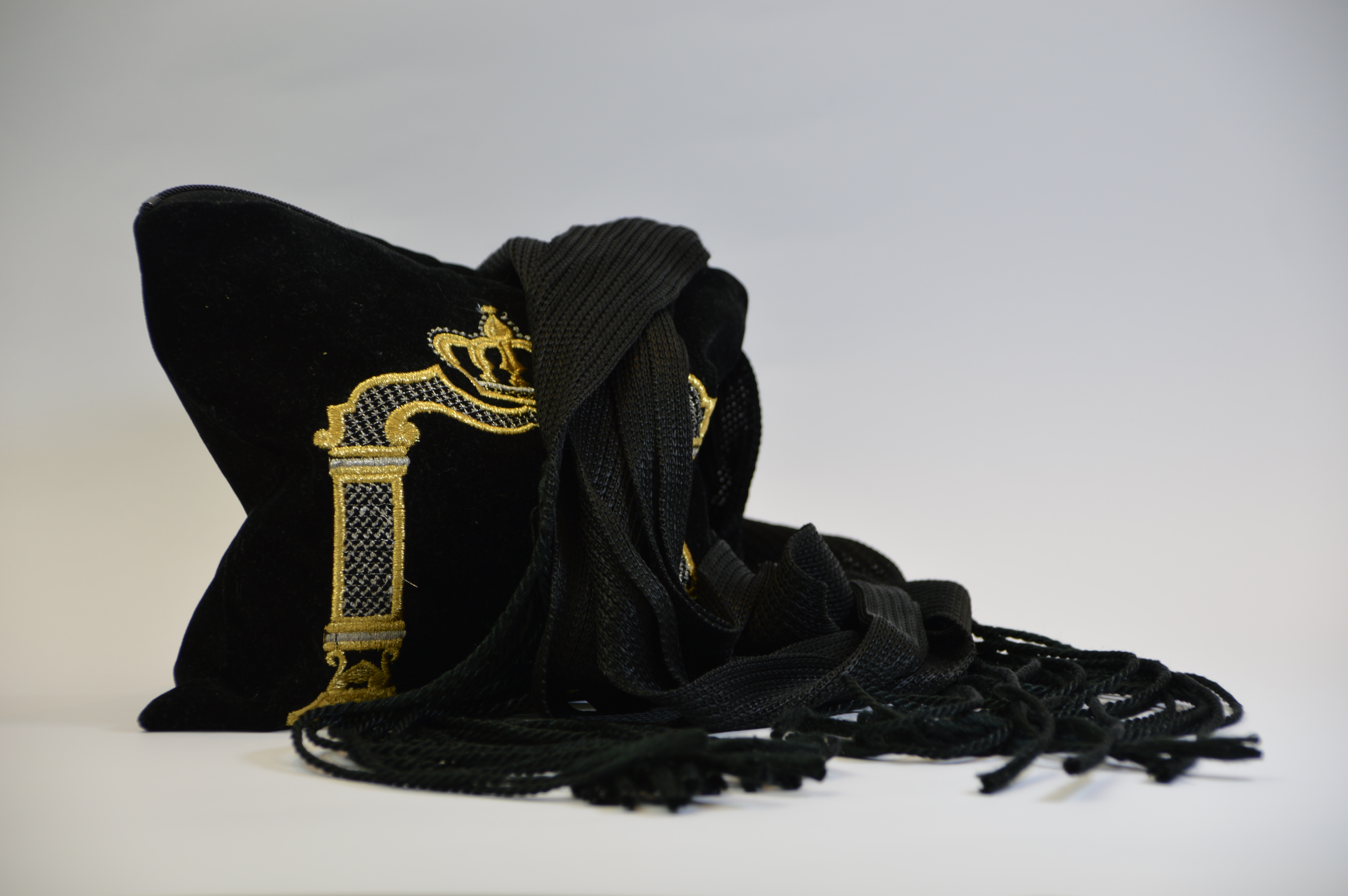
Silk-like gartel

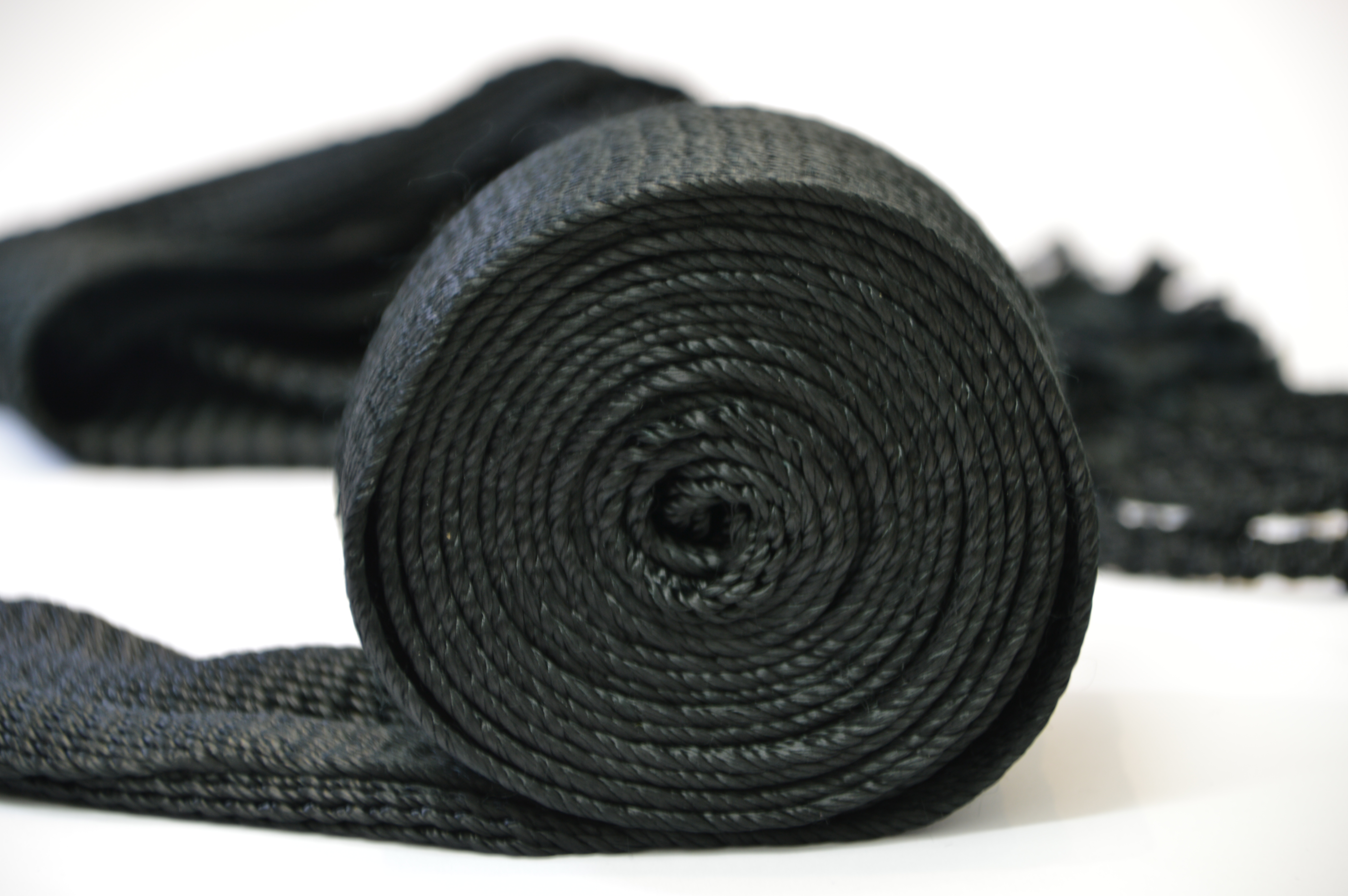
Silk woven gartel

The gartel is a belt used by Jewish males, predominantly (but not exclusively) Hasidim, during prayer. "Gartel" is Yiddish for "belt". The word comes from the same source as German "Gürtel", which is also cognate with the English "girdle", and "girt".

The vast majority of those that wear a Gartel during prayer are Hasidic Orthodox Jews; a smaller number of non-Hasidic Haredim, mostly Lithuanian Jews who emigrated to Jerusalem in the late 18th to early 19th centuries called Perushim.

Gartels are generally very modest in appearance. Most are black, but some gartels are white, possibly to be used on some special occasions such as Yom Kippur, and cost more than black counterparts of the same width. Gartels are composed of multiple strings, anywhere from four to over forty in number.

Hasidic custom requires that there be a physical divide between the heart and the genitalia during any mention of God's name. It is commonly explained that separating the upper and lower parts of the body manifests a control of the animal instincts of the person by the distinctly human intellect.

Additionally, donning a gartel is a preparation for prayer, in accordance with the line "Prepare to meet your God, O Israel" in the Biblical verse, Amos 4:12 (Shulchan Aruch O.C. 91:2). The Mishnah Berurah (91:5) states that any waistband is adequate for the first requirement; however for the second requirement more is needed, which the gartel fulfills.

Hasidic authorities maintain that a regular belt or the waistband of trousers do not suffice to fulfill this requirement, and that a designated sash is to be used. Other authorities maintain that other modifications, such as donning a formal hat and jacket, suffice to fulfill the second requirement of preparation for prayer, as long as the first requirement is fulfilled.

Some Hasidic groups such as Skver and Belz wear the gartel all day as part of their regular attire.

A gartel is also used by some Hasidim for a Mitzvah tantz.

== See also ==
- Bendle
