= Bekishe =

Long coat

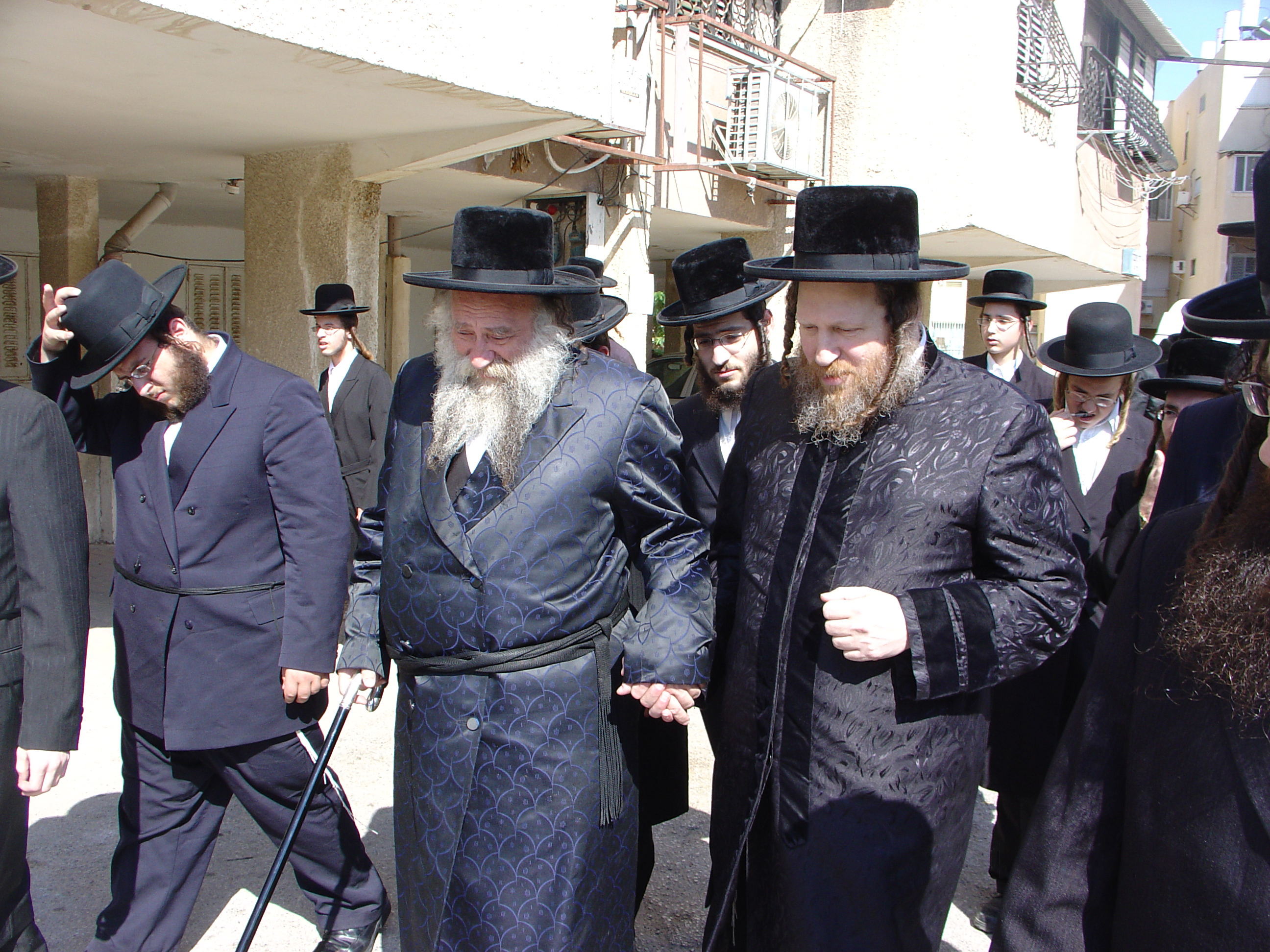
Two Hasidic Rebbes are shown wearing tish bekishes with high "samet hit"s (felt hats). The late Khuster Rebbe Shmelke Leifer (of Boro Park, Brooklyn in New York and Pittsburgher Rebbe Mordechai Yissachar Ber Leifer (of Ashdod, Israel; with strohkes)

A bekishe or beketche (Yiddish: בעקעטשע beketche or בעקישע bekishe) is a type of kaftan, usually made of black silk or polyester, worn by Hasidic Jews and by some non-Hasidic Haredi Jews. The bekishe is worn mainly on Shabbos and other Jewish holidays or at weddings and similar events. During the week, it is customary to wear a rekel, made of wool or polyester, looking like a regular double-breasted suit but it is longer. Hasidic rabbis who wear a bekishe during the week wear a more ornate version for Shabbos, often lined with velvet or a color other than or in addition to black.

The New York Times described the Bekeshe as a "fancier Sabbath version" of the Rekel.

== History ==
The bekishe derives from the Polish bekiesza a sort of fur-lined coat. The bekiesza was often richly decorated, sometimes with galloon. A force driving or governing caution with use of wool is the Biblical injunction against mixing it with linen (Lev. 19:19; Deut. 22:11).

== Design ==
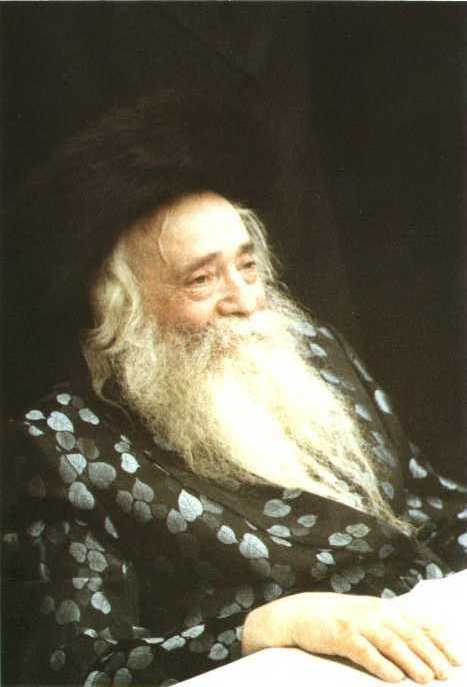
Rabbi Yekusiel Yehudah Halberstam wearing a Tish Bekishe

The bekishe is typically black. There are two main types of bekishe. The glatt (plain, lit. smooth) bekishe is solid colored; it is usually worn for Friday night and Saturday morning prayers. For Shabbat meals, the patterned bekishe, also known as a tish bekishe (table Bekishe), is worn. The tish bekishe is also worn by some during the Shabbos afternoon prayer service and the night after Shabbat. Both can be made of silk, although nowadays it is usually polyester. Some non-Hassidic Orthodox Jews wear a tish bekishe at home during Shabbos meals. Many Hassidic Rebbes, mainly of Hungarian lineage, wear tish bekishes with various colors, usually either blue or silver, often with black. Many Hassidic Rebbes wear samet (velvet) or strohkes (velvet piping), symbolizing tefillin, on the bekeshe.

=== Kaftan ===
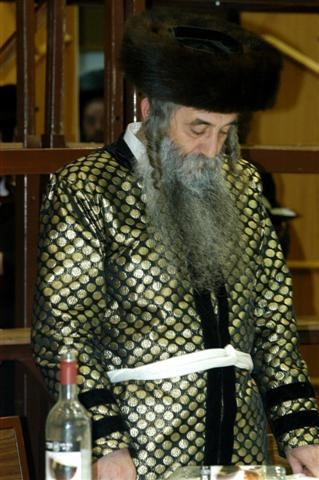
The Dorohoi Rebbe wearing a kaftan

The gold and blue striped garments worn by Yerushalmi Haredim including Toldos Aharon, Toldos Avrohom Yitzchok, Dushinsky, Shomrei Emunim, Pinsk-Karlin, and many but not all in Breslov and Karlin-Stolin, as well as non-affiliated Yerushalmi Haredim like the Perushim are called kaftans. The members of these movements centered in Jerusalem or one of the Jerusalem-affiliated suburbs like Beitar Illit, Ramat Beit Shemesh, and Modi'in Illit wear these gold coats. Those who live further away, for example in Bnei Brak, Ashdod or outside of Eastern Israel, usually wear black bekishes like most other Hasidim, as do some of those who live in Jerusalem.

The gold kaftan is generally worn after marriage; before marriage, either a black bekishe or weekday-style clothing is worn on days when a bekishe is usually worn. Some of those who wear the gold bekishe switch to black on Shabbat afternoon before Mincha. That is seen in Dushinsky and with many of the Prushim.

=== Kapoteh ===
Married Chabad hasidim wear a long black kapoteh (frock coat) instead of a bekishe. The kapoteh or frak, besides its unique waist seam construction, has four buttons in the front (as opposed to six or eight in Nadvorna - Kretschnef, on the front of a bekishe), as well as slit in the back, which is lacking on the bekishe. The kapoteh may be made with either wool or silk. Although black is the preferred predominant color, other hues can be present, including on the buttonholes.
