= Mildred Bendall =

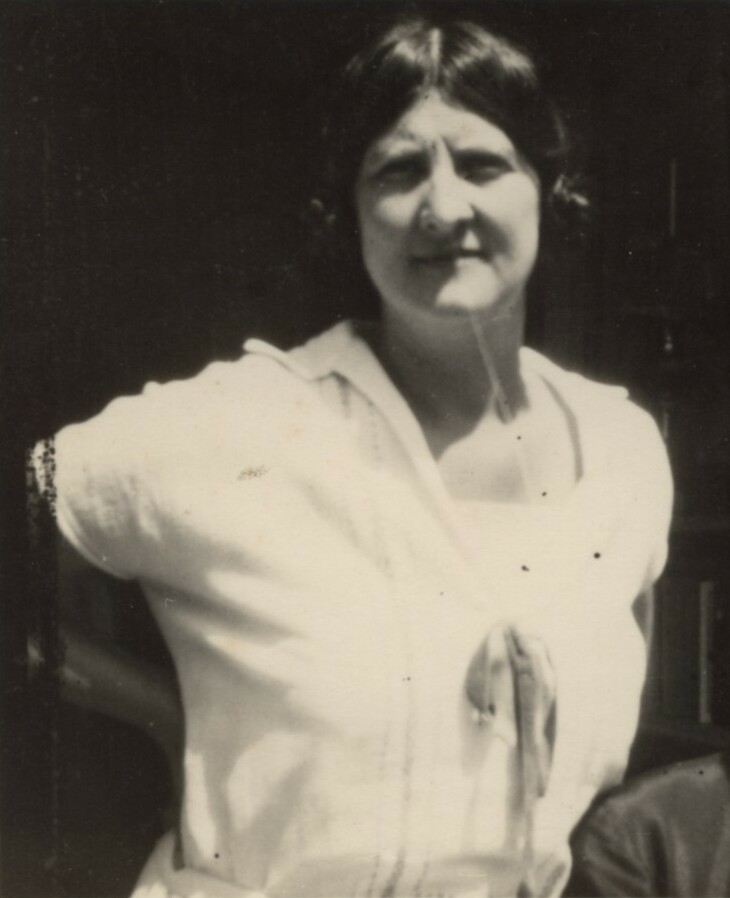
- Mildred Bendall
- Born: 27 November 1891; Bordeaux, France
- Died: 27 December 1977 (aged 86); Bordeaux, France
- Known for: Painting
- Movement: School of Paris, Fauvism, Abstraction

Mildred Bendall (27 November 1891 – 27 December 1977) was an active force of the avant-garde in Bordeaux, and instrumental in building a real exchange with Paris. (Note: GALLIANO - DES GARETS Françoise, La Vie culturelle à Bordeaux 1945-1975, Bordeaux, pp. 32-35, 81-82 and 112-114) (Note: E. BÉNÉZIT, Dictionnaire Critique et Documentaire des Peintres, Sculpteurs, Dessinateurs et Graveurs; Vol. 2, Gründ, Paris, 1999, p. 281)

== Early years ==
Born in Bordeaux in 1891, Mildred was the third and youngest child of Manley Forbes Bendall, a highly successful English merchant, and Marie-Blanche-Elisabeth Chrisman. Bendall trained as a painter during 1910–1914 at the atelier of local painter Félix Carme and her work Coin de Salon Bordelais won a first in the 'Peinture au Palmarès de l'Union Féminine de Bordeaux'. Bendall's early paintings emulate the 'Chardinesque' style of her tutor, but nonetheless, show her solid grounding in drawing, technique and composition, which later earned her the respect of Henri Matisse and Albert Marquet.

In 1920, Bendall gained admission to the 'Salon des Artistes Français' in Paris, which eventually prompted her move to Paris during 1927–1928. It was her time at the 'Académie de la Grande Chaumière' in Montparnasse, where the painters of the 'École de Paris' congregated, that transformed her style. Her friendship with Matisse in particular left a lasting influence on Bendall and her work. She adopted to great effect his 'Fauve' ideas on colour as building blocks for form and space. Although Bendall never married, Jean-Gérard Matisse, the son of the painter, did propose to her.

== Career development ==
Under Matisse's guidance, Bendall became an active force of the avant-garde in Bordeaux, and built a real exchange between the provincial capital and Paris. In 1928, she helped to found the 'Artistes Indépendants bordelais' as a counter-movement against traditional Academism. Under her influence Bonnard, Braque, Utrillo, Matisse and Picasso all submitted paintings to its yearly exhibitions. In 1929, Bendall was also a founding member of 'Le Studio', a free and loosely grouped academy, and first to provide life-drawing classes in Bordeaux.

In 1937, the Galerie de Paris, in Paris exhibited Bendall's work in 'Jeune France', alongside canvasses by Kees van Dongen, Max Jacob and Raoul Dufy. The Musée National d'Art Moderne, Paris, purchased the work Bouquet a la table ronde.

== Late life ==
Following the Second World War and until her death in 1977, Bendall, remained true to colour and composition. She blended the techniques of Fauvism and Expressionism, articulating her individual visual enjoyment of Nature and its harmonies.
