= Simon Bendall =

English numismatist (1937–2019)

Simon Bendall (8 November 1937 – 26 June 2019) was an English numismatist, recognised as the leading authority on late Byzantine coins.

== Career ==
After finding a Roman coin as a schoolboy, Bendall became a collector, scholar and dealer in ancient coins. Upon leaving Cheltenham College, he did military service in the Royal Artillery (1956–58), partly in Germany, then studied part-time for his diploma at the Institute of Archaeology, University of London (1962-1965), while working in the coin department of Spink & Son (1959-1965). He became a Fellow of the Royal Numismatic Society in 1961 and was elected an Honorary Fellow in 2010. He was also elected a Fellow of the Society of Antiquaries in 1985.

Bendall spent August 1980 at Dumbarton Oaks, working on their Byzantine coin collection with Professor Philip Grierson, and later reading the text of Grierson’s Catalogue of the Byzantine Coins in the Dumbarton Oaks Collections and in the Whittemore Collection, Vol. V, Michael VIII to Constantine XI, 1258 - 1453. Grierson recorded how “my work was checked and where necessary corrected by Simon Bendall, whose knowledge of the series is unrivaled … Bendall’s contribution to the study of Palaeologan coinage has been without parallel in the last three decades.”

Bendall worked for several specialist coin dealers: the coin department of Spink & Son (1959-1965), A.H. Baldwin (1967-1987), Numismatic Fine Arts in Los Angeles (1987-1989), and in 1998 catalogued the first sale of the Byzantine gold coins from the Nelson Bunker Hunt Collection for Sotheby’s, New York. In the 2000s he rejoined Spink’s in London (2000-2010).

He sold part of his collection to the Ashmolean Museum, Oxford, in 1999, which made up the core of Eleni Lianta’s Late Byzantine Coins 1204-1453 in the Ashmolean Museum University of Oxford (2009). His recent acquisitions of Byzantine coins were stolen in London in February 2018. Bendall died on 26 June 2019.

== Publications ==
Bendall wrote several books on Byzantine coins and weights, and over 200 articles on coins, military history and jewellery. They include:

- (with P.J. Donald) The Billon Trachea of Michael VIII Palaeologos 1258-1282 (London: Baldwin, 1974)
- (with P.J. Donald) The Later Palaeologan Coinage: 1282-1453 (London: Baldwin, 1979)
- (with Cécile Morrisson) ‘Un trésor de ducats d’imitation au nom d’Andréa Dandolo (1343-1354)’ (Revue Numismatique 6e sér. 21, 1979)
- ‘Palaeologan gold coins from the mint of Thessalonica’ (Schweizer Münzblätter 125, 1982)
- (with David Sear and Michael Dennis O'Hara) Byzantine Coins and their Values (London: Seaby, 1987)
- A Private Collection of Palaeologan Coins (Wolverhampton, 1988)
- ‘The coinage of Constantine XI’ (Revue Numismatique 6e sér. 33, 1991)
- Byzantine Weights: An Introduction (London: Lennox Gallery, 1996)
- ‘The Byzantine coinage of the mint of Jerusalem’ (Revue Numismatique 159, 2003)
- An Introduction to the Coinage of the Empire of Trebizond (London: Spink, 2015)
