= Quo =

Quo may refer to:

- Quo (group), a 1990s hip hop group, or their 1994 album
- Quo (Status Quo album), 1974
- Quo (magazine), a Spanish-language magazine
- Akwa Ibom Airport, IATA airport code "QUO"

== See also ==
- Quo vadis (disambiguation)
- Status Quo (disambiguation)
