= Status Quo Ante =

Status quo ante is a Latin phrase for 'the way things were before'.

Status Quo Ante may also refer to:

- Status Quo Ante (Hungary), Jewish communities in Hungary
- Status Quo Ante Synagogue (Trnava), Slovakia
- Status Quo Ante Synagogue (Târgu Mureș), Romania
- Rumbach Street Synagogue, also known as Status Quo Ante Synagogue, Budapest, Hungary

== See also ==
- Status quo
- Status quo ante bellum, Latin for 'the way things were before the war'
