= Status Quo Ante Synagogue =

Status Quo Ante Synagogue may refer to:

- Status Quo Ante Synagogue (Trnava), Slovakia
- Status Quo Ante Synagogue (Târgu Mureș), Romania
- Rumbach Street Synagogue, Budapest, Hungary

== See also ==
- Status quo ante (disambiguation)
- Schism in Hungarian Jewry
