= Weiser Fulop =

Weiser Fulop (Fülöp, Pinchas) was a famous chief Hazan-Cantor (synagogue) (Hebrew: וייזר פיליפ) of Nyíregyháza, Hungary.

He was born in 1879 in Zemplén County, Stropkov district in Hungary. He also was the Hazan at Rumbach Street synagogue in Budapest.

His songs appeared in records between 1908 and 1910.

Thanks to a contribution by George Soros, two of his most famous songs, El male rachamim and Rosh Hashanah appeared on a CD (#15 and #16) - "Jewish Cantorial Music from Hungary 1906-1929".

He was murdered during World War II on February 2, 1940.

Weiser Fulop left five sons (Adolf, Izso, Alexander-Shlomo, Jancsi-Jacob, Dezso) and three daughters (Frici, Bozsi, Magda).

Adolf died in a Siberian labor camp; his brother Alexander-Shlomo, who was with him at the camp, escaped and went back to Budapest, Hungary in 1945.

Except Dezso, who stayed in Hungary with his family, all the others immigrated to Israel with their families between 1949 and 1956.

Dr. Giora Ram (Weiser) is his grandson, Alexander-Shlomo Weiser's son.
