= Grünberger House =

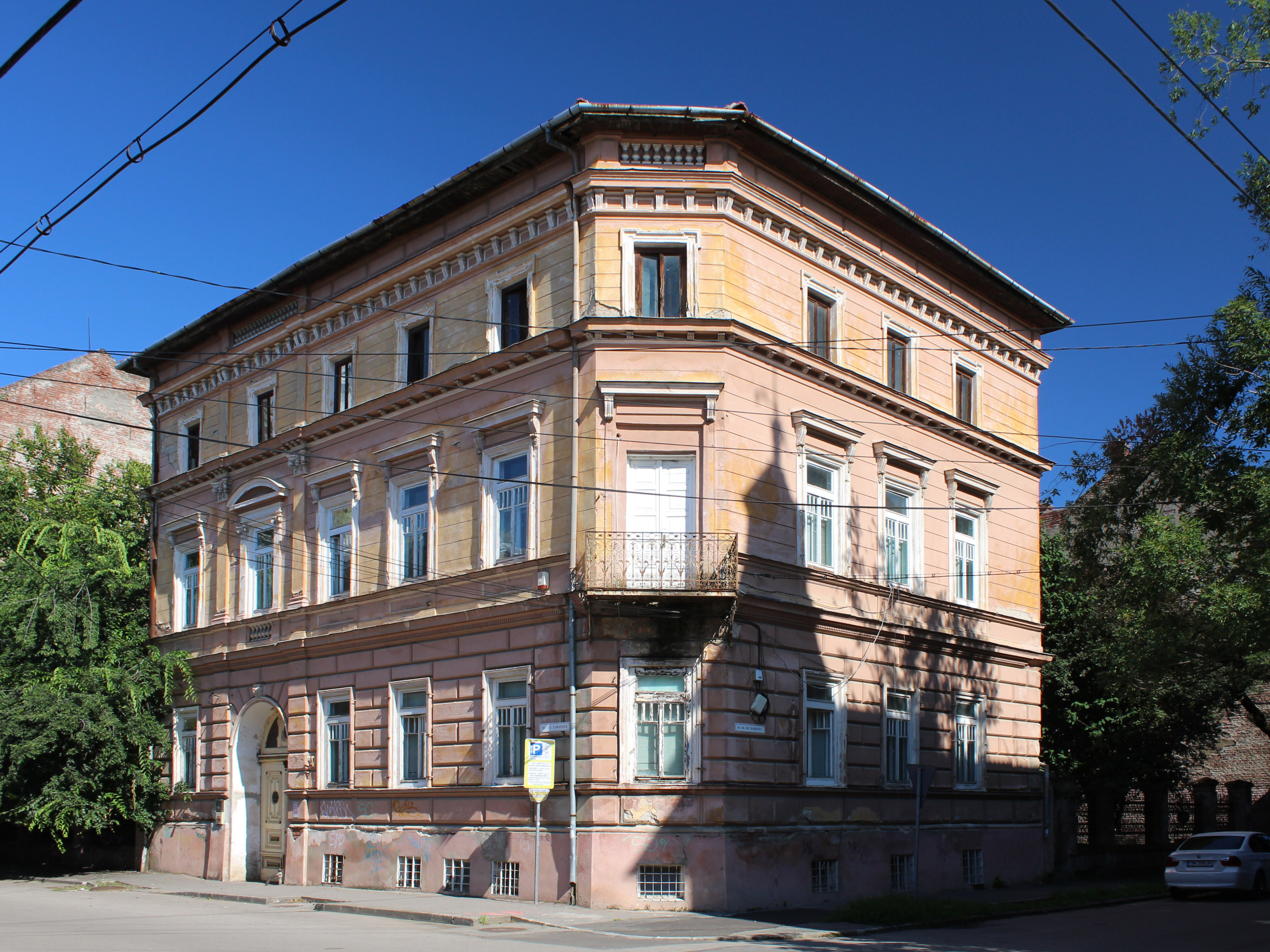
- Former names: Tauber House; Deutsch House; Israelite Primary School

General information
- Architectural style: Historicist/Eclectic
- Address: 1 Ion Luca Caragiale Street, Timișoara, Romania
- Coordinates: 45°45′23.4″N 21°14′45.6″E

The Grünberger House or the Israelite Primary School is a historical building in the Fabric district of Timișoara, Romania.

== History ==
In 1858, the area south of what is now 3 August 1919 Boulevard—stretching from Romans' Square to Queen Marie Park—was known as the Ropemakers Field (Seiler Wiese). During the latter half of the 19th century, this land contained only a single park, known as the Vorpark. Owned by the city and granted by the military under the condition that it be properly maintained, the park fell into neglect and was mainly used as a children's playground and a site for market stalls. In 1888, despite opposition from the military, the city hall resolved to divide the land into 26 residential plots, stipulating that only multi-storey buildings could be constructed along Andrássy Avenue, now 3 August 1919 Boulevard.

One of the buyers was Adolf Grünberger, who purchased a 252-square-fathom house lot from the city hall for 2,700 crowns (or the equivalent amount in forints). The date of the building permit and the name of the architect remain unknown. A city plan confirms that the building existed on the plot before 1897, though not earlier than 1892. It is also depicted on postcards that were in circulation prior to 1899.

Adolf Grünberger was a Jewish merchant from Racibórz County (Ratibor), now part of the Upper Silesian Voivodeship in southern Poland. When he received Hungarian citizenship on 20 October 1886, he was 46 years old, a widower, and the father of five children: Lénárd Pál (17), Hedvig (13), János (12), Margit (10), and Elza (7). In 1889, according to the marriage register of the Israelite community in Fabric, he married Sarolta Schmidt, a 46-year-old widow from Königsberg. Grünberger worked as a clerk and owned a men's clothing workshop located on Mérleg Street (present-day Costache Negruzzi Street) in Fabric. Between 1896 and 1899, he also served on the supervisory committee for the construction of the new synagogue of the Israelite Status Quo Community in Fabric. The committee's responsibilities included organizing fundraising efforts, securing the synagogue's design, and overseeing its execution.

In 1899, Adolf Grünberger sold the property to timber merchant Henrik Tauber for 18,000 crowns. Henrik Tauber, a Jewish entrepreneur born in 1827 in what is now Slovakia, was involved in the processing and trade of timber. It appears that his family had a long-standing tradition in the industry, as his brother, Emanuel Tauber (1831–1900, Vienna), also traded in timber and later became the director of the Bayersdorf & Biach branch in Timișoara, a company that owned several sawmills in the Timișoara area by the late 19th century.

In the address directories of Timișoara for 1906, 1909, and 1910, Henrik Tauber is listed as the owner of the building at 2 Jókai Mór Street (now 1 Ion Luca Caragiale Street). It is also notable that Tauber was neighbors with his primary business partner, wood merchant David Hübsch, who owned the building at 2 Gheorghe Marinescu Street. At the turn of the 20th century, the two jointly operated the Tauber-Hübsch company, which was involved in the timber trade.

In 1916, the property was sold by the First Timișoara Bank (Hungarian: Temesvári Első Takarékpénztár; German: Erste Temeswarer Sparkassa) to Rudolf Deutsch, the president of the Neolog Status Quo community in the Fabric district. The building likely came into the ownership of the Jewish community in the 1920s, who transformed it into an Israelite Primary School with the support of David Hübsch, Rudolf Totis, the general director of ILSA, and Victor Klein, the executive director of ILSA and president of the Jewish community in Fabric. The first Jewish primary school in the city was founded in 1918 in the Iosefin district. At the one in Fabric, Zoltán Székely (1883–1946) was the principal starting in 1927.

During World War II, the Israelite High School in Timișoara was evacuated and repurposed as the headquarters of the Timișoara Police Department. Education for the upper grades continued partially within this building.

Following the 1948 education reform, which resulted in the closure of Jewish elementary and high schools, the building was designated as the headquarters for the Yiddish language school. This decision was made within the framework of permitting state schools for minorities to operate. However, in 1958, the school was ultimately closed due to a decline in student enrollment.

Currently, the building, listed as a historical monument, is owned by Emil Emeric Mihai, president of the Association Générale des Tziganes Roumains de France, headquartered in Strasbourg.

== Architecture ==
The building is designed in an eclectic historicist style. A beveled corner, created by the junction of the facades, forms a small, angled corner facade. The ground floor is adorned with bossages, lending the structure a sense of solidity and monumentality, and serving as a visual foundation for the upper levels. A wrought-iron balcony graces the corner facade, contributing an element of elegance and dynamic character to the overall composition.
