= Status Quo =

Status quo is a Latin phrase meaning "the existing state of affairs".

Status quo or Status Quo may also refer to:

- Status Quo (band), a British rock band
- Status quo (Israel), a political understanding between secular and religious parties
- Status Quo (Holy Esplanade), the Hashemite custodianship of Jerusalem's holy sites
- Status Quo (Jerusalem and Bethlehem), the 19th-century Ottoman firman that dictates the sharing of major Christian sites between various denominations
- Status Quo? The Unfinished Business of Feminism in Canada, a 2012 documentary film by Karen Cho

== See also ==
- Status quo ante (disambiguation)
- Status Quo Ante Synagogue (disambiguation)
- Stat Quo, American rapper
