= Opava Synagogue =

Former synagogue in the Czech Republic

- Czech: Synagoga v Opavě
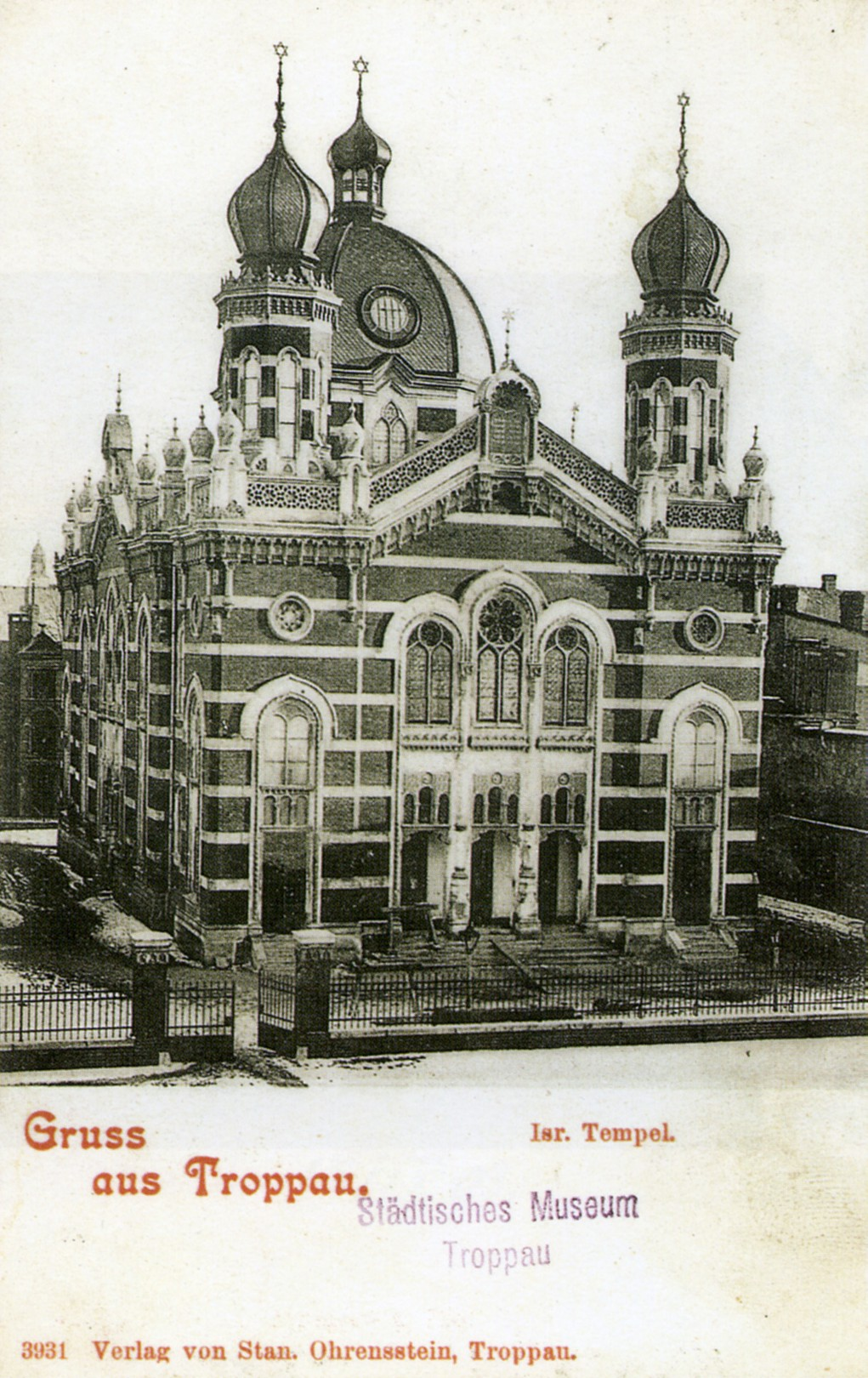
- A postcard of the former synagogue in 1900

- Location of the destroyed synagogue in the Czech Republic

Religion
- Affiliation: Judaism (former)
- Ecclesiastical or organizational status: Synagogue (1895–1938)
- Status: Destroyed

Location
- Location: Opava, Silesia
- Country: Czech Republic
- Interactive map of Opava Synagogue
- Coordinates: 49°56′21″N 17°53′49″E

Architecture
- Architect: Jakob Gartner
- Type: Synagogue architecture
- Style: Romanesque Revival; Moorish Revival
- Completed: 1895
- Destroyed: 1938
- Dome: Three

The Opava Synagogue (Czech: Synagoga v Opavě), or Tempel, was a former Jewish synagogue, located in Opava (German: Troppau), Silesia, in the Czech Republic.

Designed by Jakob Gartner in the Romanesque Revival and Moorish Revival styles, the synagogue was completed in 1895.

The synagogue was destroyed in 1938, when it was burned and levelled to the ground by the local fanaticized Sudeten Germans. It was one of the most distinctive structures of its kind in prewar Czechoslovakia.

The name of the street where the tempel originally stood still bears the name “U synagogy”. The neighbouring rabbinical house, built in the same architectonical style, survived the Nazi rampage and is preserved.

== See also ==
- History of the Jews in the Czech Republic
