= Debrecen Neological Synagogue =

Demolished synagogue in Debrecen, Hungary

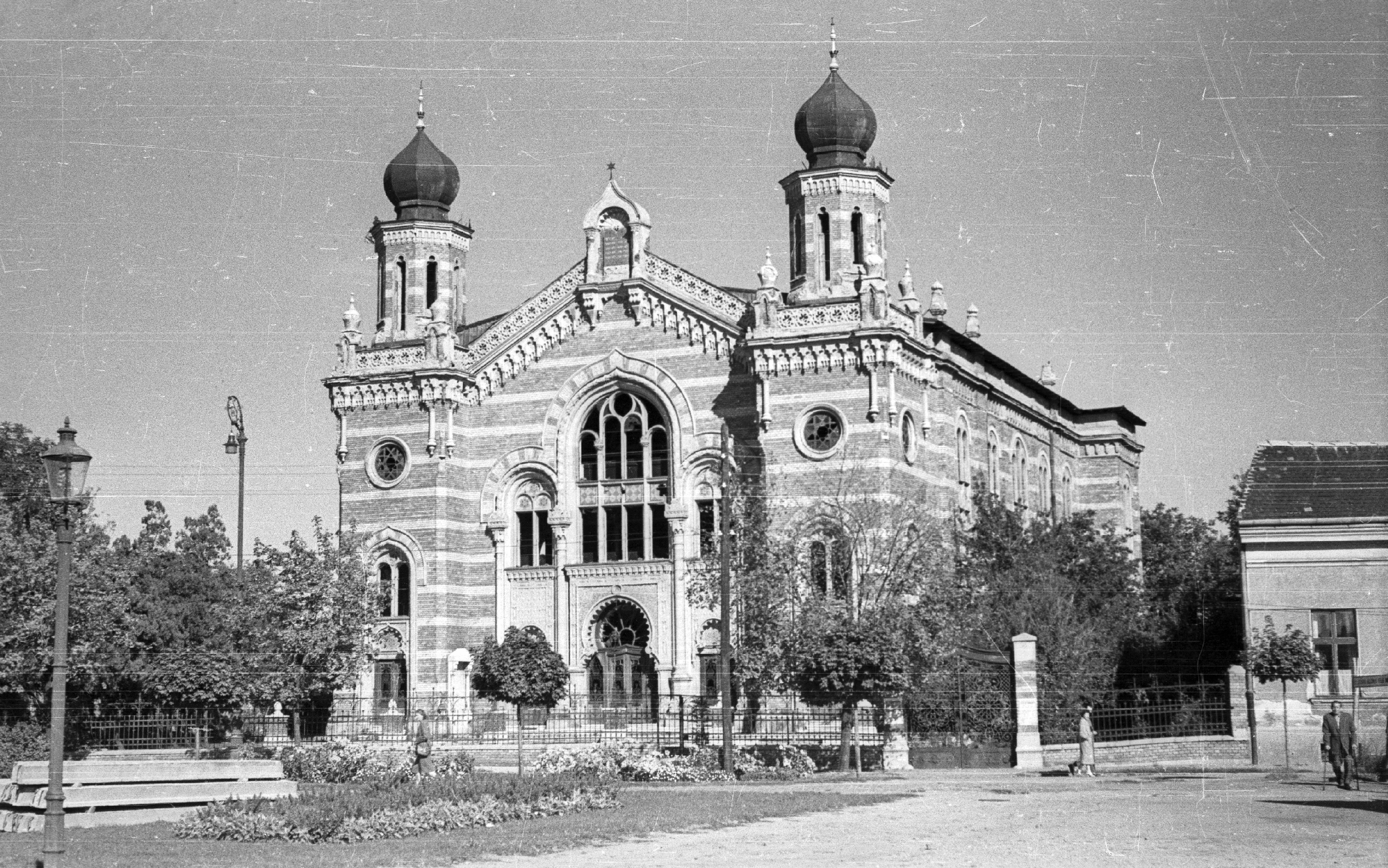
- The former synagogue in 1958

Religion
- Affiliation: Neolog Judaism (former)
- Ecclesiastical or organizational status: Synagogue (1909–c. 1939)
- Status: Demolished

Location
- Location: Deák Ferenc Street, Debrecen
- Country: Hungary

Architecture
- Architect: Jakob Gartner
- Type: Synagogue architecture
- Style: Moorish Revival
- Completed: 1896
- Demolished: 1960s

Specifications
- Capacity: c. 250 seats
- Dome: Two (maybe more)
- Materials: Brick

The Debrecen Neological Synagogue is a former Neolog Jewish synagogue that was located on Deák Ferenc Street in Debrecen, Hungary. Completed in 1896, the building was used a synagogue until World War II. After damage during the war, restoration began in 1949; however the building was demolished in the 1960s following a fire.

== History ==
The large synagogue in Deák Ferenc Street was built in 1896 in the Moorish Revival style, according to the plans of Jakob Gartner, a Jew in Vienna. Although the brick-walled, double-towered, domed synagogue did not stand on the street line, it was easily visible from the large square in front of it. Its façade formation was characterized by a strong triple articulation, and its mass became plastic and articulated by the strong, risalit-like protrusions of its edges. It suffered damage during World War II. Renovation began in 1949, however, during the roofing work, the attic caught fire and the building burned down. The city authority decided in the 1960s to demolish it.

== See also ==
- History of the Jews in Hungary
- List of synagogues in Hungary
