= Jakob Gartner =

Austrian architect 1861–1921

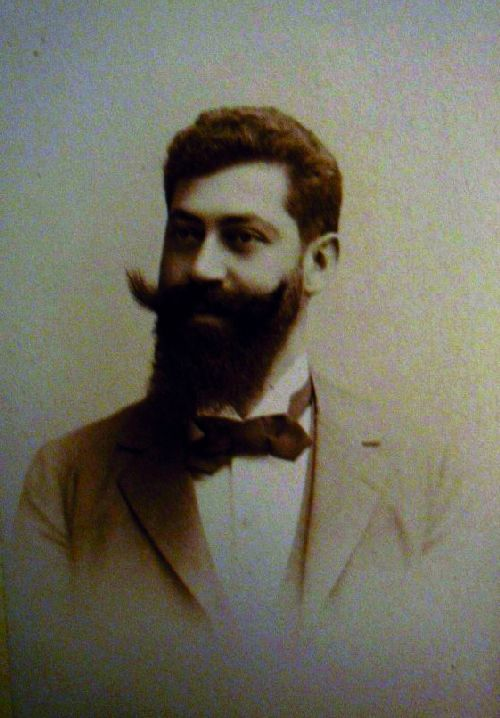
Jakob Gartner

Jakob Gartner, sometimes Jacob Gartner (6 October 1861 in Přerov – 15 April 1921 in Vienna) was an Austrian Jewish architect.

== Life ==
Gartner was born on 6 October 1861, came from a Jewish family with five children. He studied in Brno, and then worked as an intern with other architects in Bielitz and Vienna. In 1888 he became independent and designed several dwellings and a synagogue. He died on 15 April 1921 in Vienna. He was laid to rest in Döbling.

Gartner designed several synagogues in historic Hungary, including Debrecen, Trnava (now Slovakia), Galgoc (today Slovakia), and Târgu Mureș (today Romania). He was likely also the designer of the synagogue at the Újpest Synagogue in Budapest.

Some of his buildings were later destroyed during the National Socialist pogroms.

Gartner was married to Anna Lanzer.

== Buildings ==
- 1885–1886: Újpest Synagogue, Budapest (presumption)
- 1889: Pilsen Synagogue
- 1890: Galgóczi Synagogue
- 1892–1893: Holešov Synagogue
- 1892–1896 Opava Synagogue, destroyed in 1938
- 1894: Debrecen Neological Synagogue
- 1895–1897: Olmütz Synagogue, destroyed in 1939
- 1896: Humboldtgasse Synagogue, Vienna, Humboldtgasse 27, died in 1938
- 1897: "Zu drei Hähnen" Residential and commercial building, Brno
- 1891: Synagogue in Trnava
- 1898: Apartment house, Vienna, Alsergrund, Borschkegasse 8
- 1898: Kluckygasse Synagogue, Vienna, Kluckygasse 11, destroyed in 1938
- 1898: Prerau Synagogue
- 1898: Simmeringer Synagogue, Vienna, Braunhubergasse 7, destroyed in 1938
- 1899–1900: The Târgu Mureş Synagogue
- 1899–1901: Queen Elizabeth's Birthplace, Knöllgasse 22-24 Vienna
- 1900–1901: Orlová Synagogue
- 1901: Apartment house, Vienna, Wieden, Johann-Strauß-Gasse 32
- 1901–1902: Residential building, Vienna, Josefstadt, Albertgasse 36
- 1901–1904: Prostějov Synagogue
- 1902: Residential building, Vienna, Innere Stadt, Biberstraße 4
- 1902: Residential, office and commercial building, Vienna, Innere Stadt, Stubenring 24
- 1904–1905: Residential and business house, Vienna, Stubenring 14
- 1905: Residential and business house, Vienna, Stubenring 2
- 1906: Apartment house, Vienna, Landstraße, Dapontegasse 4
- 1906–1907: Apartment House, Vienna, Mariahilf, Theoboldgasse 16
- 1907–1908: Siebenbrunnengasse Synagogue or Jubiläumstempel, Vienna, Margareten, Siebenbrunnengasse 1, destroyed in 1938
- 1908–1910: Kroměříž Synagogue
- 1910: Wohn- und Geschäftshaus, Vienna
- 1919: Pitești Synagogue, Pitești

== Gallery ==
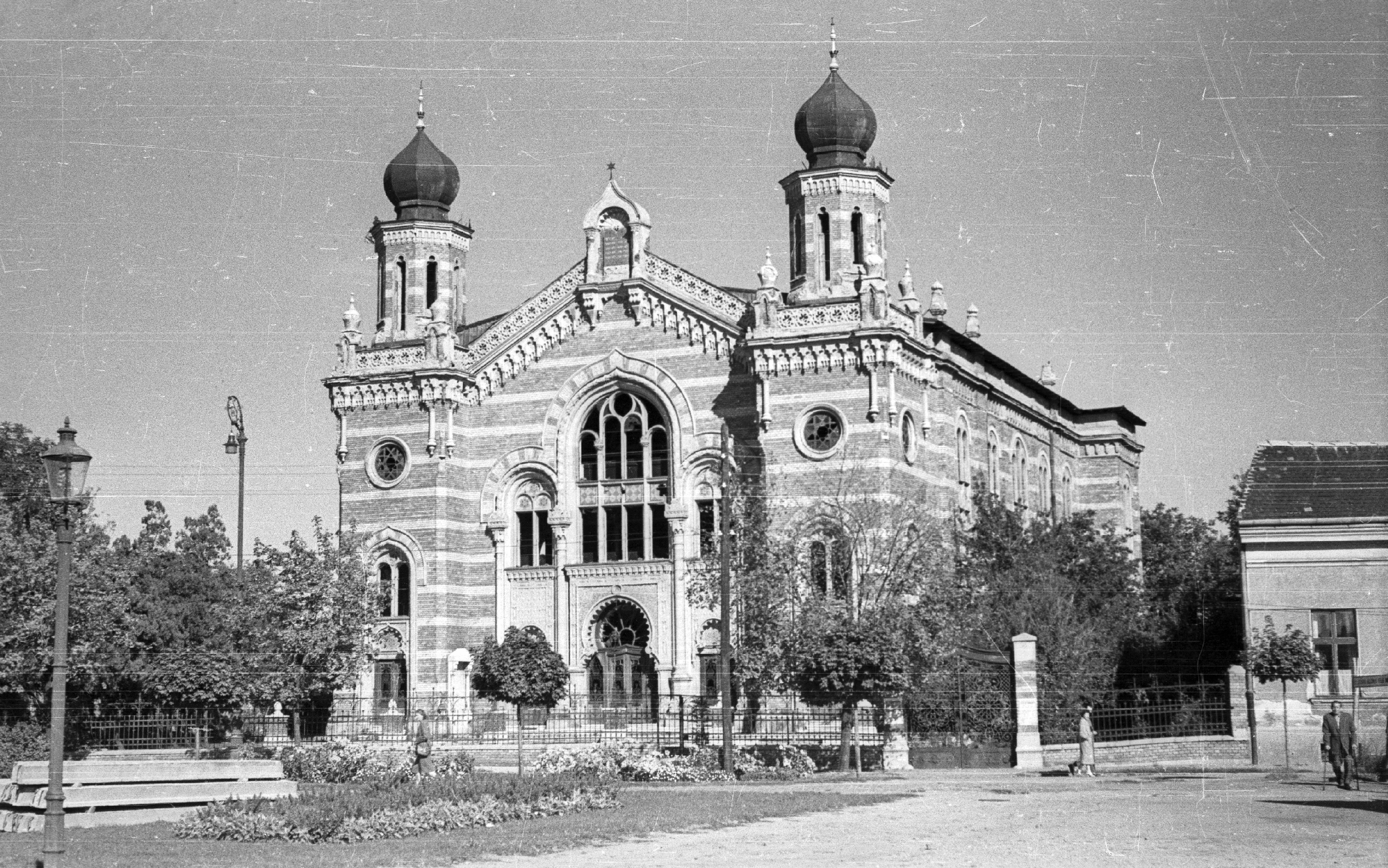
Debrecen Neological Synagogue (destroyed work)

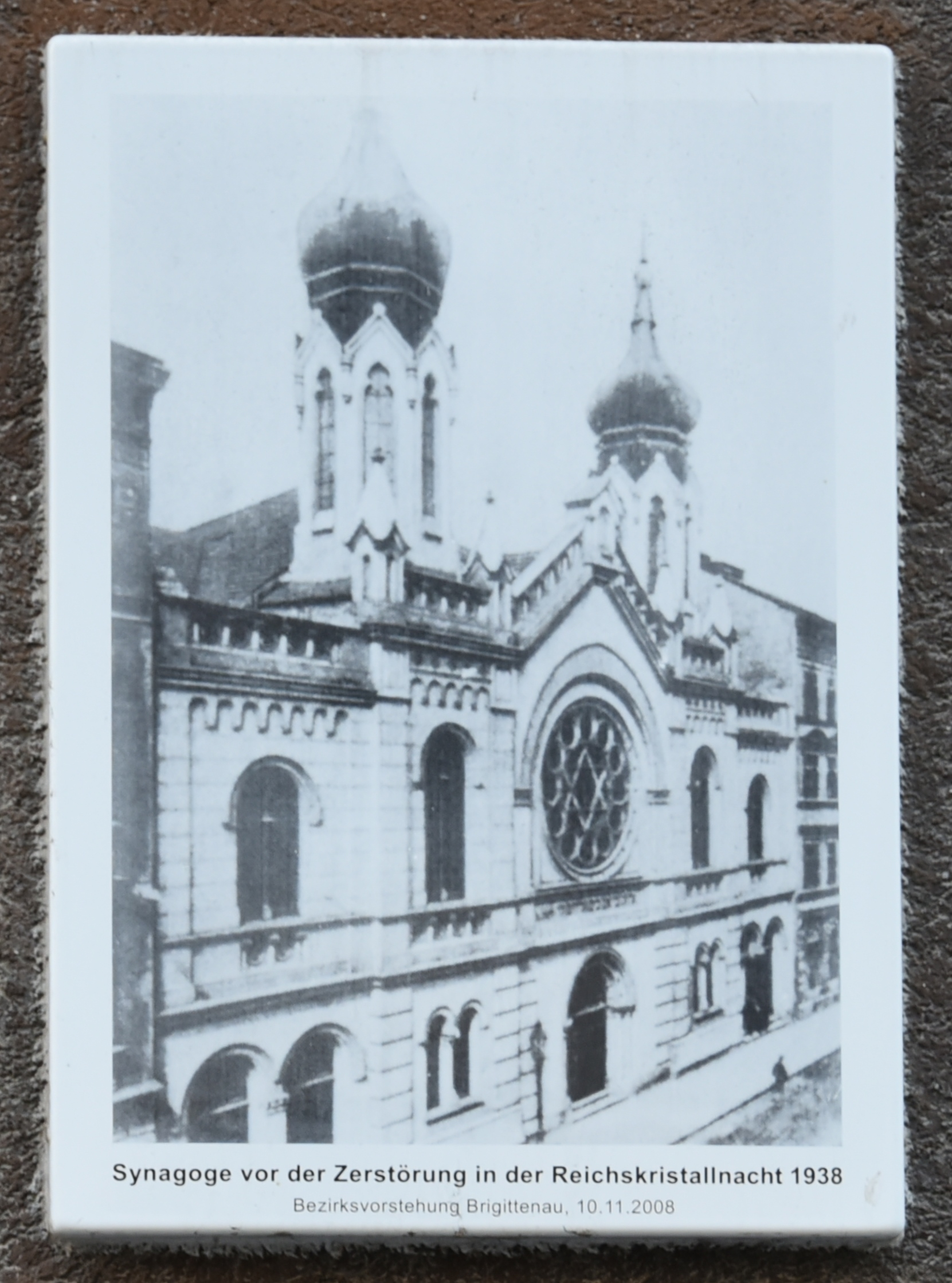
Kluckygasse Synagogue, Vienna
(destroyed work)

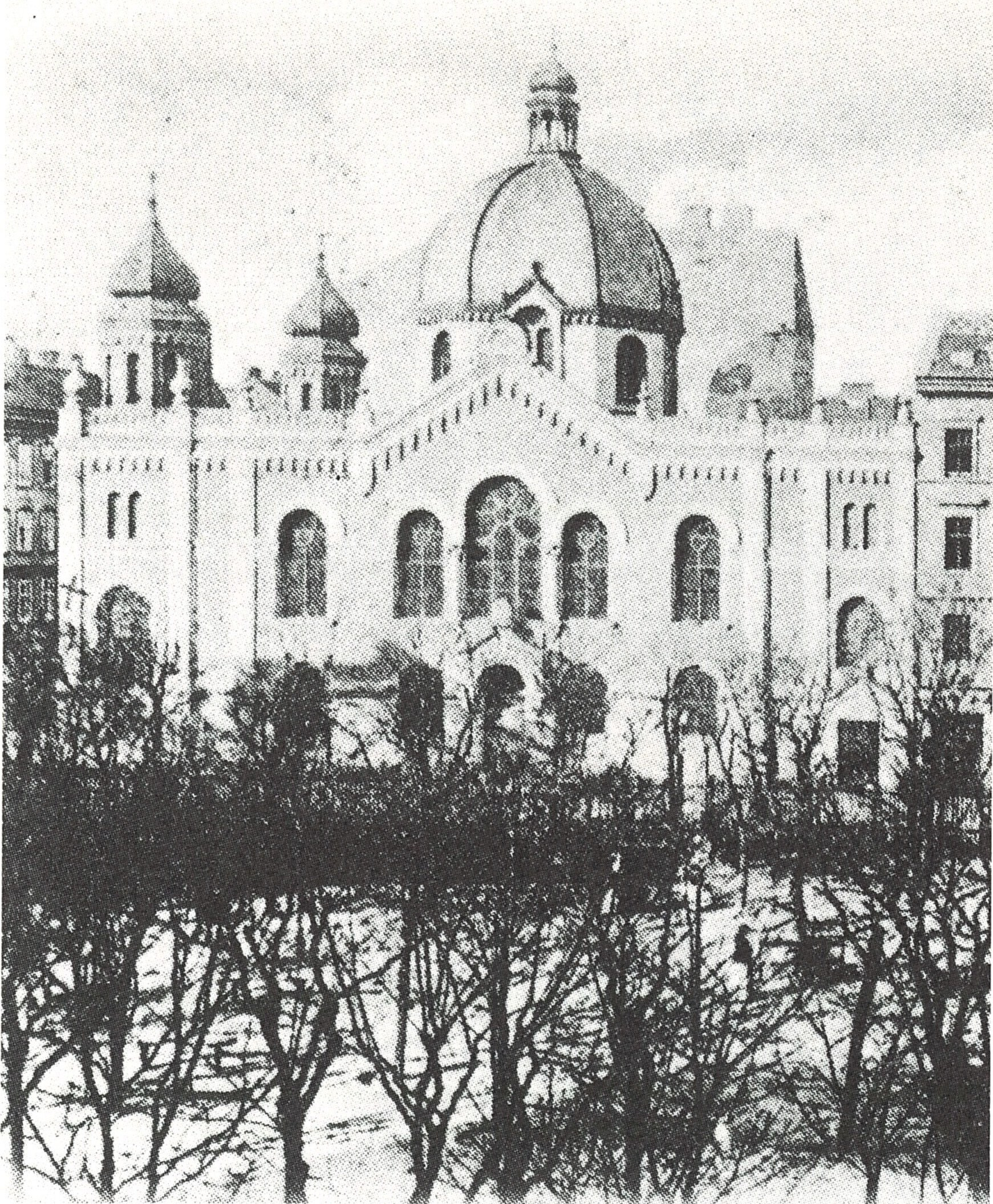
Humboldtgasse Synagogue, Vienna
(destroyed work)

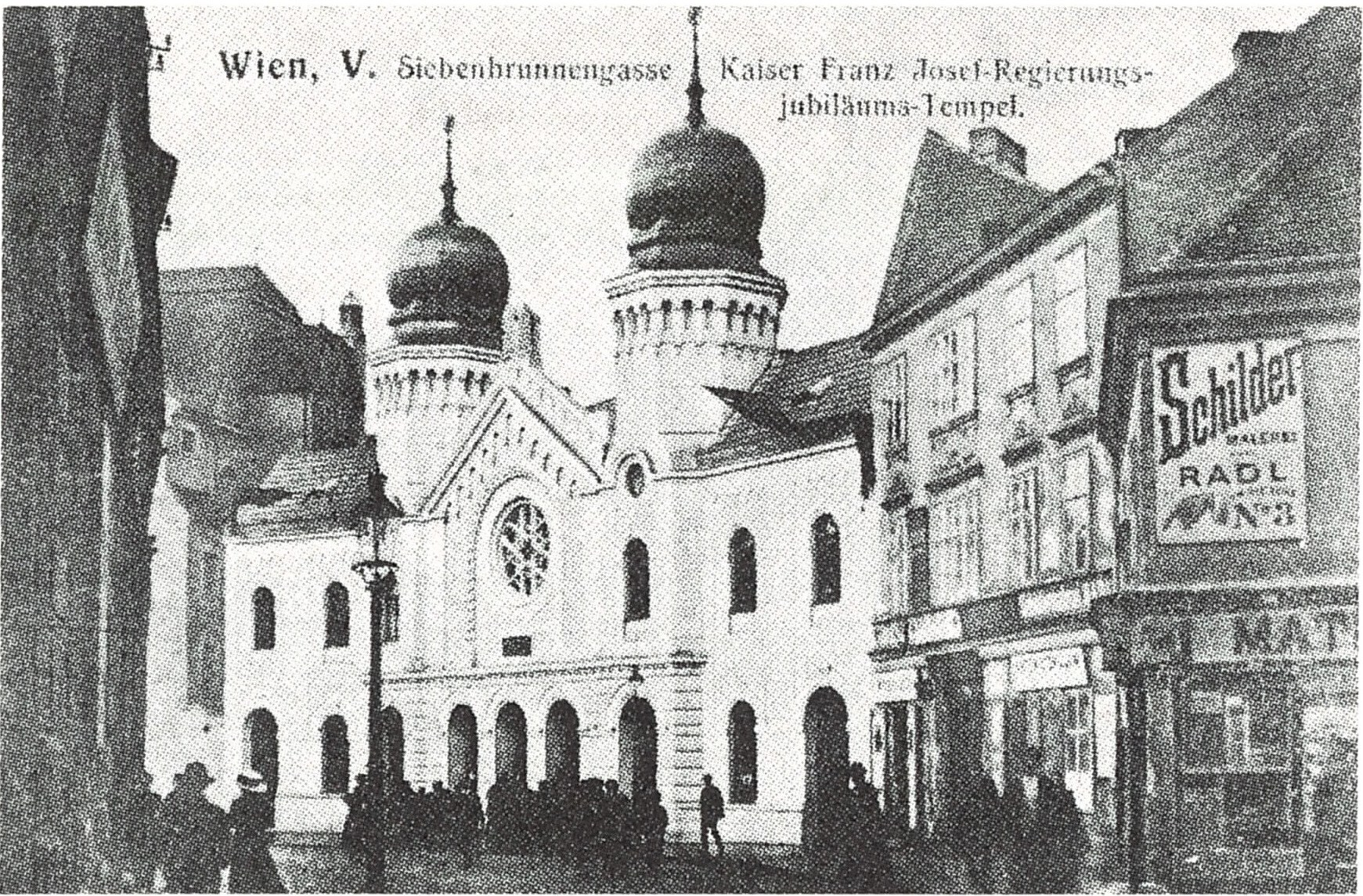
Jubilaeumstempel, Vienna
(destroyed work)

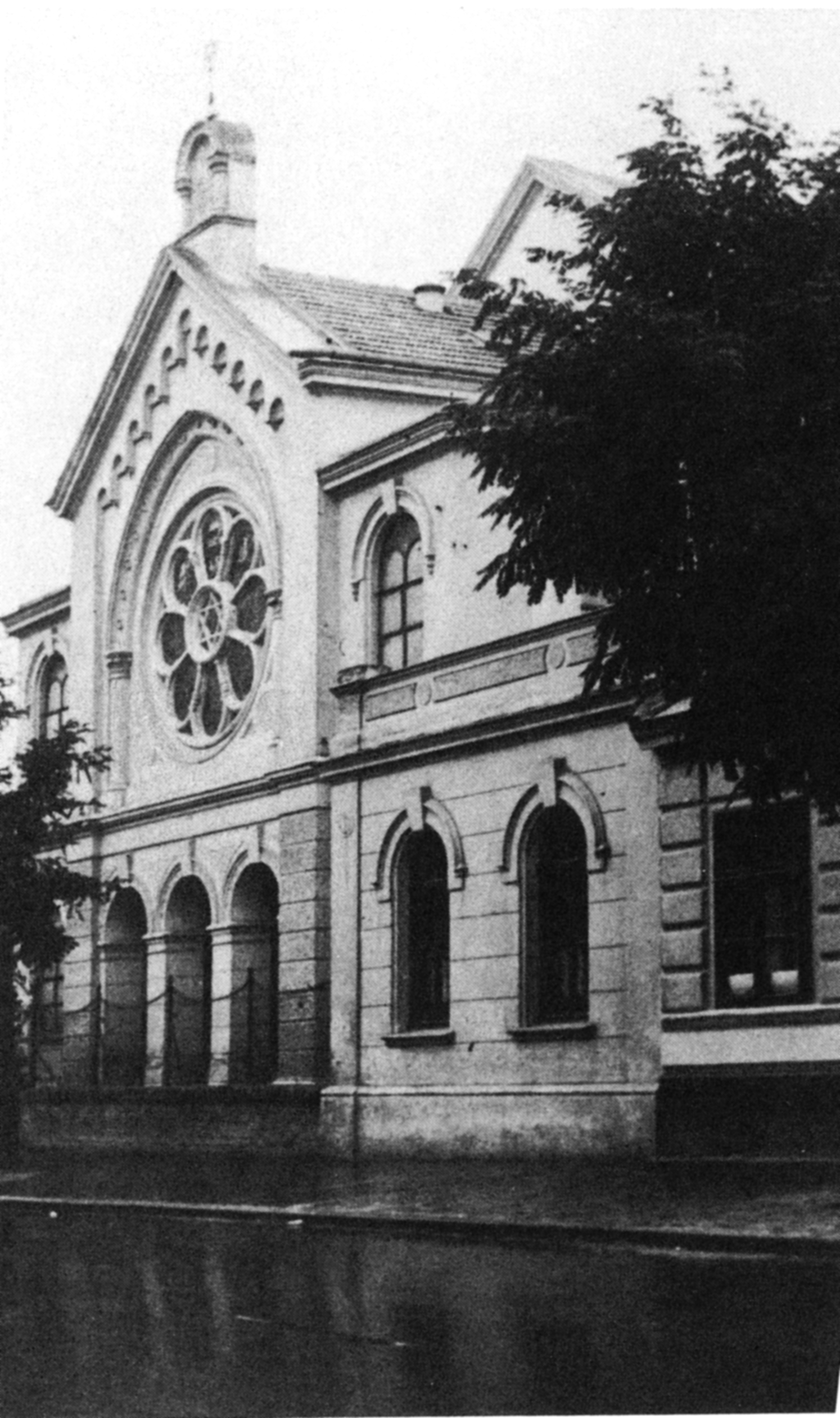
Simmeringer Synagogue, Vienna
(destroyed work)

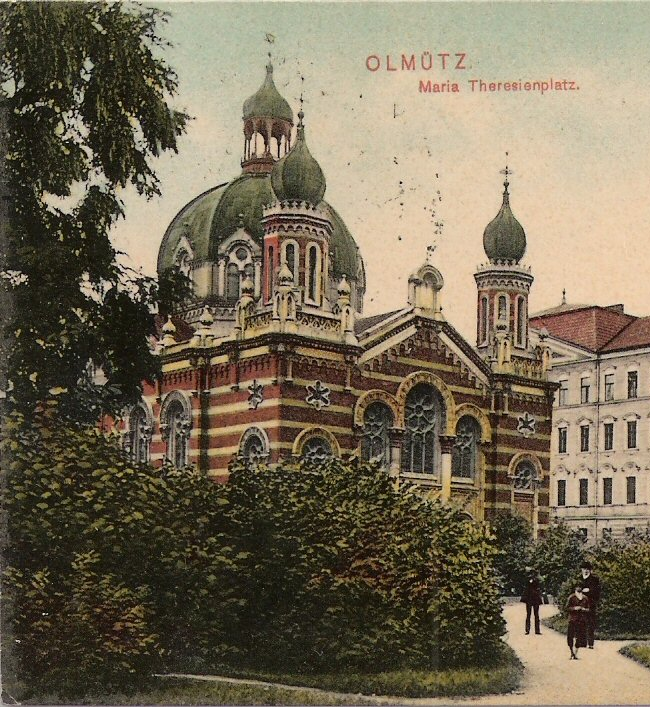
Olomouc Synagogue
(destroyed work)

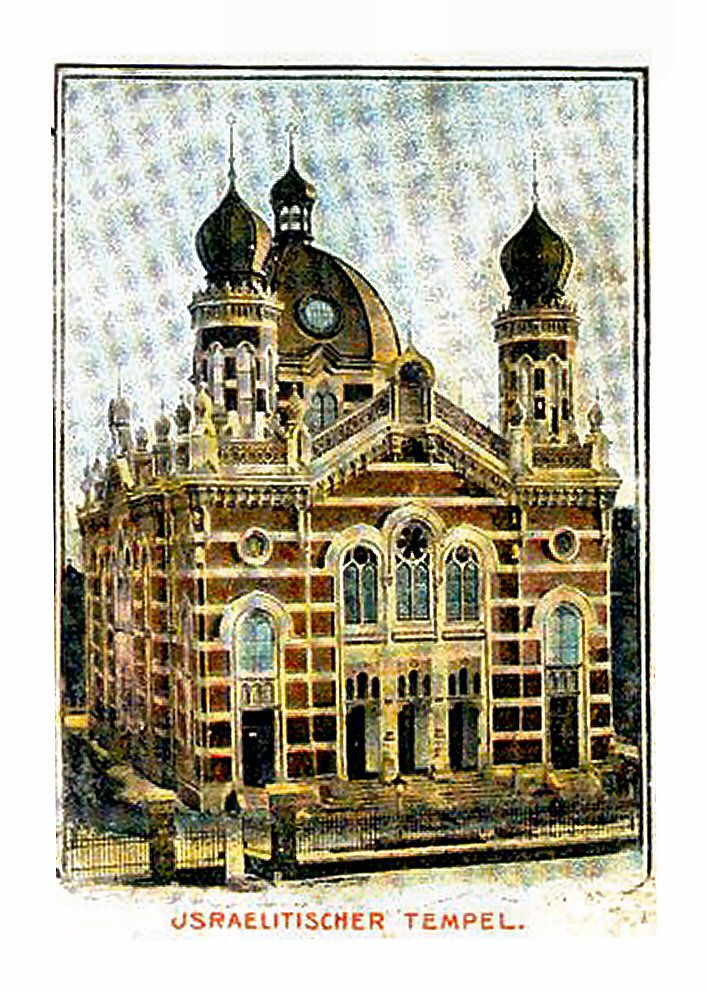
Opava Synagogue
(destroyed work)

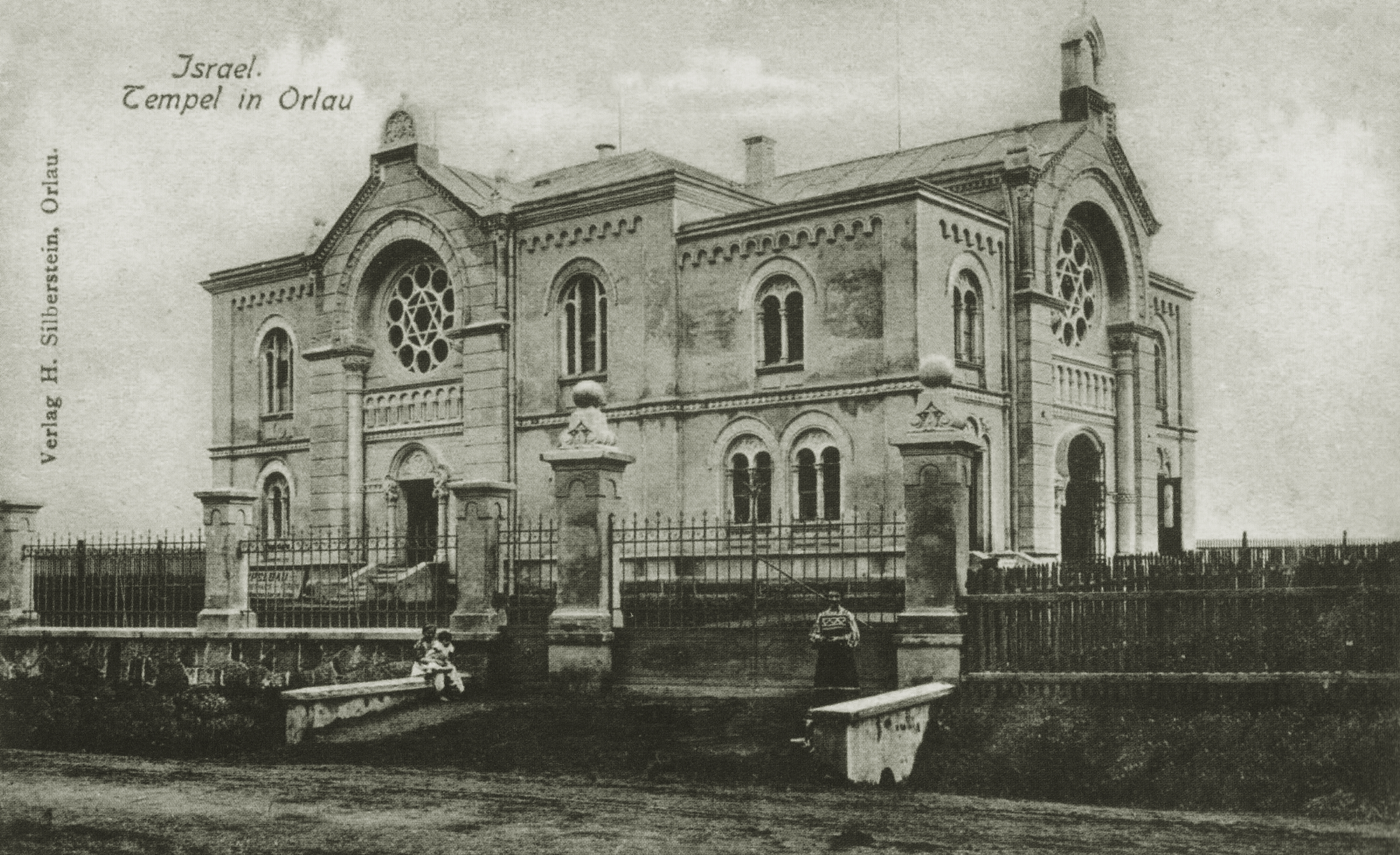
Orlová Synagogue
(destroyed work)

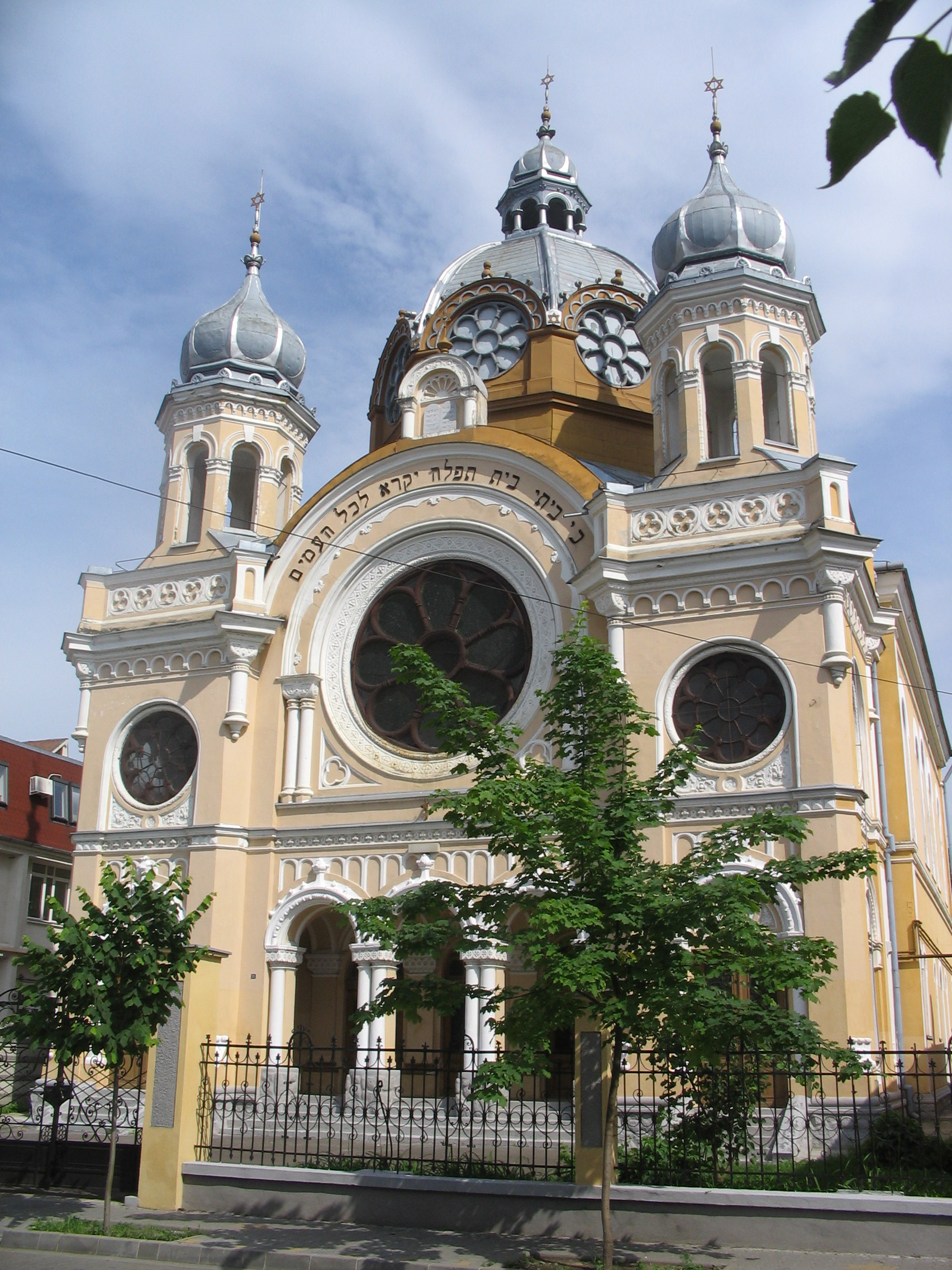
Targu Mures Synagogue

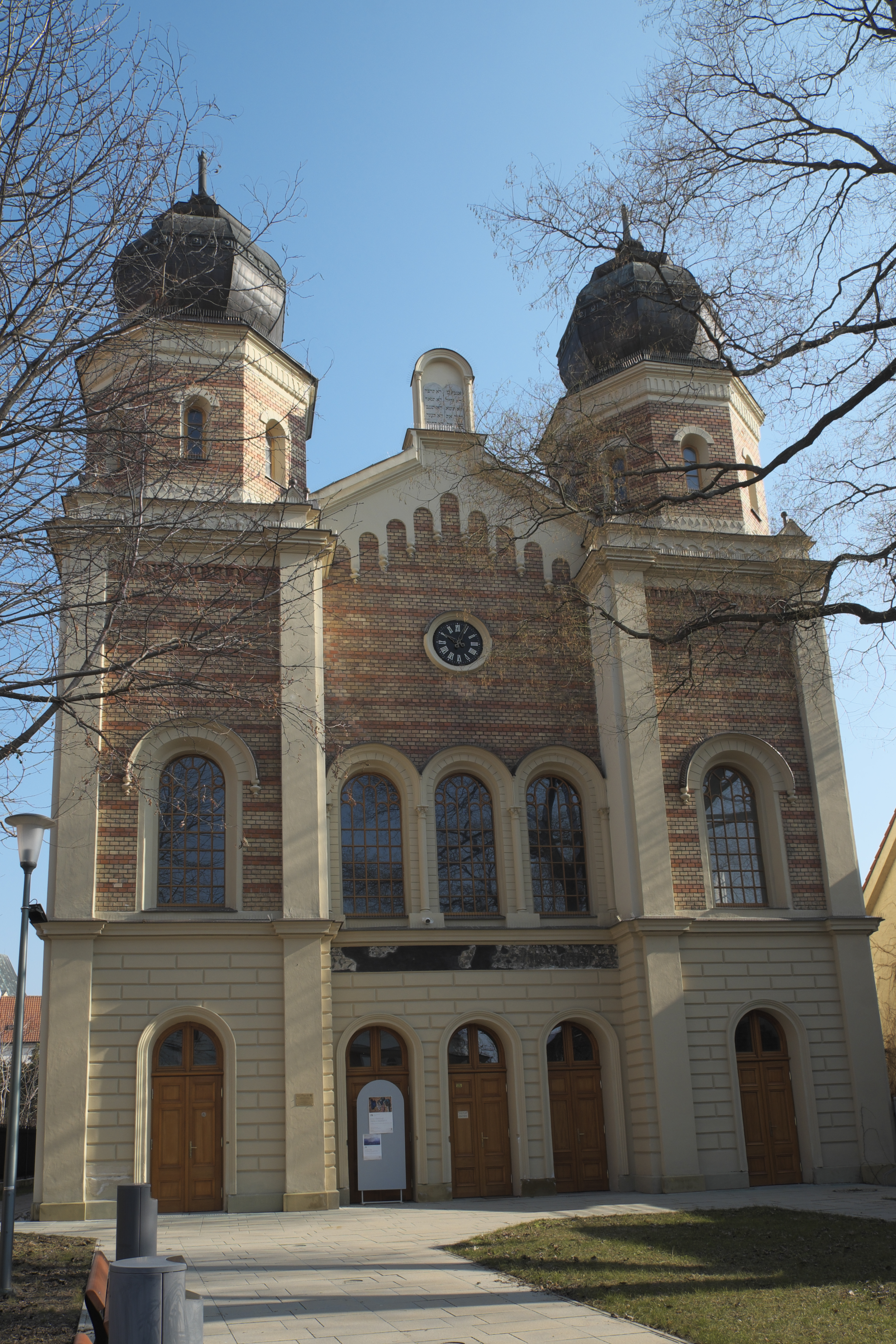
Trnava Synagogue

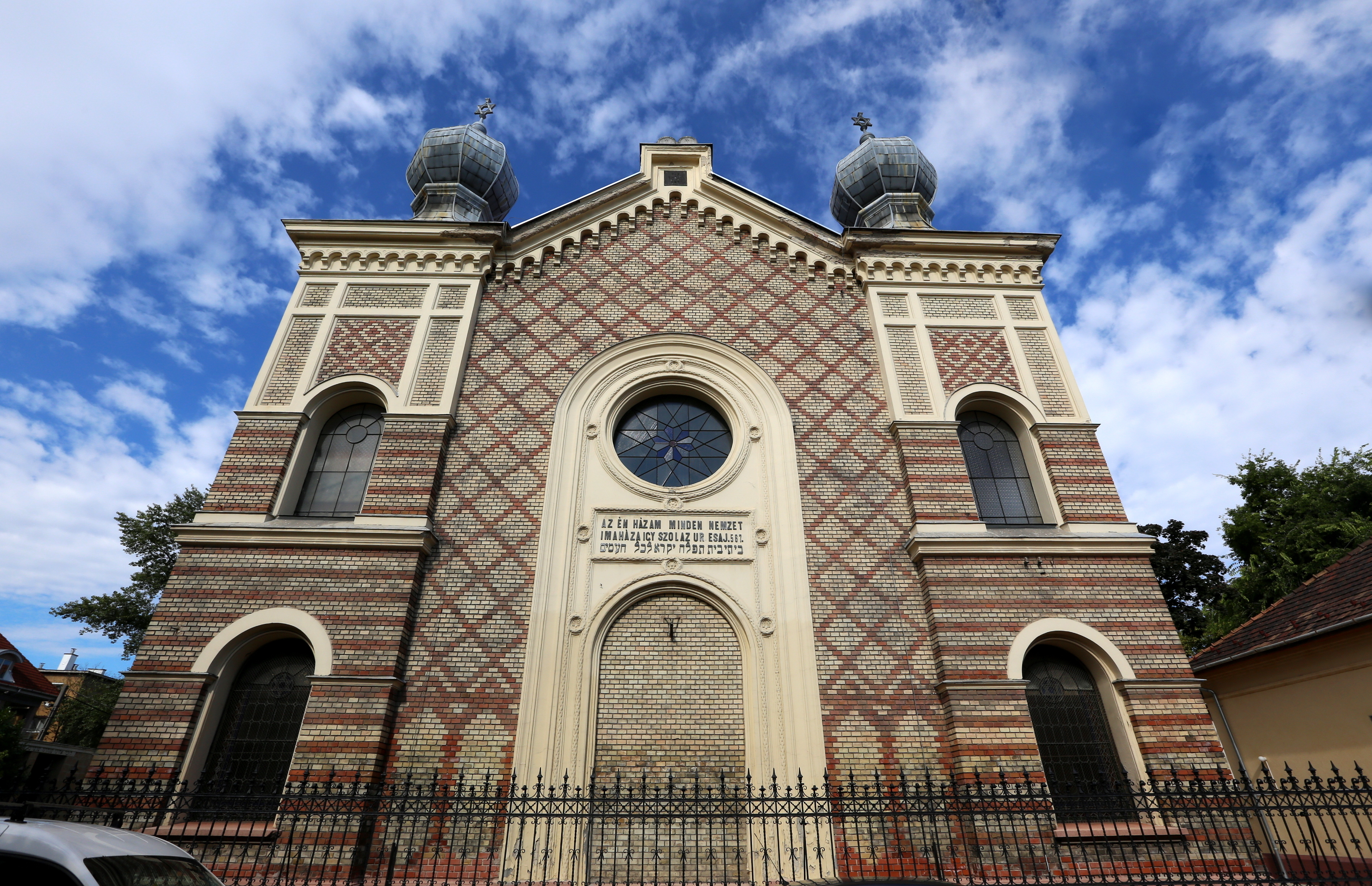
Újpest (supposed creator)

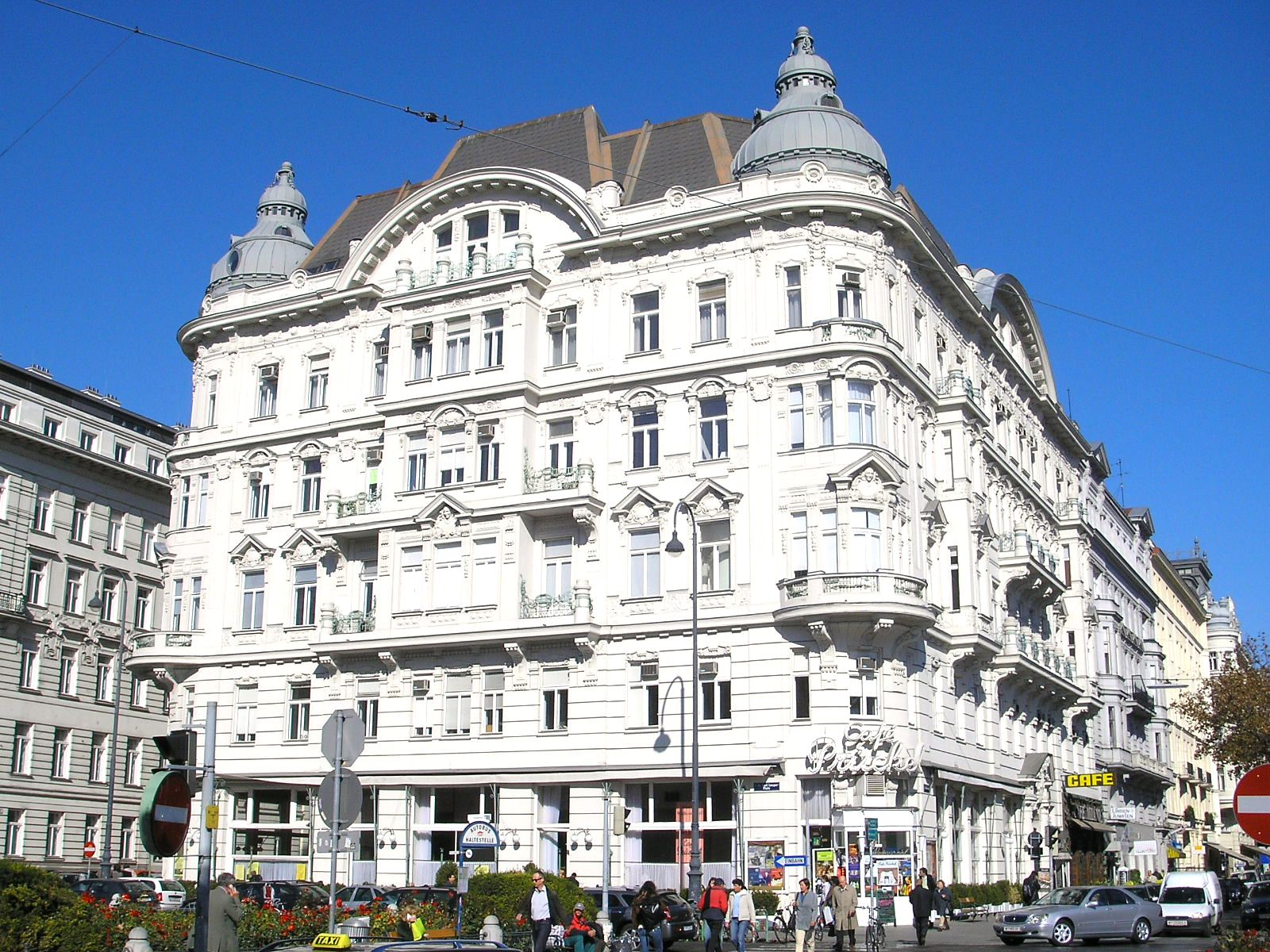
Residential, office and commercial building, Vienna, Stubenring 24

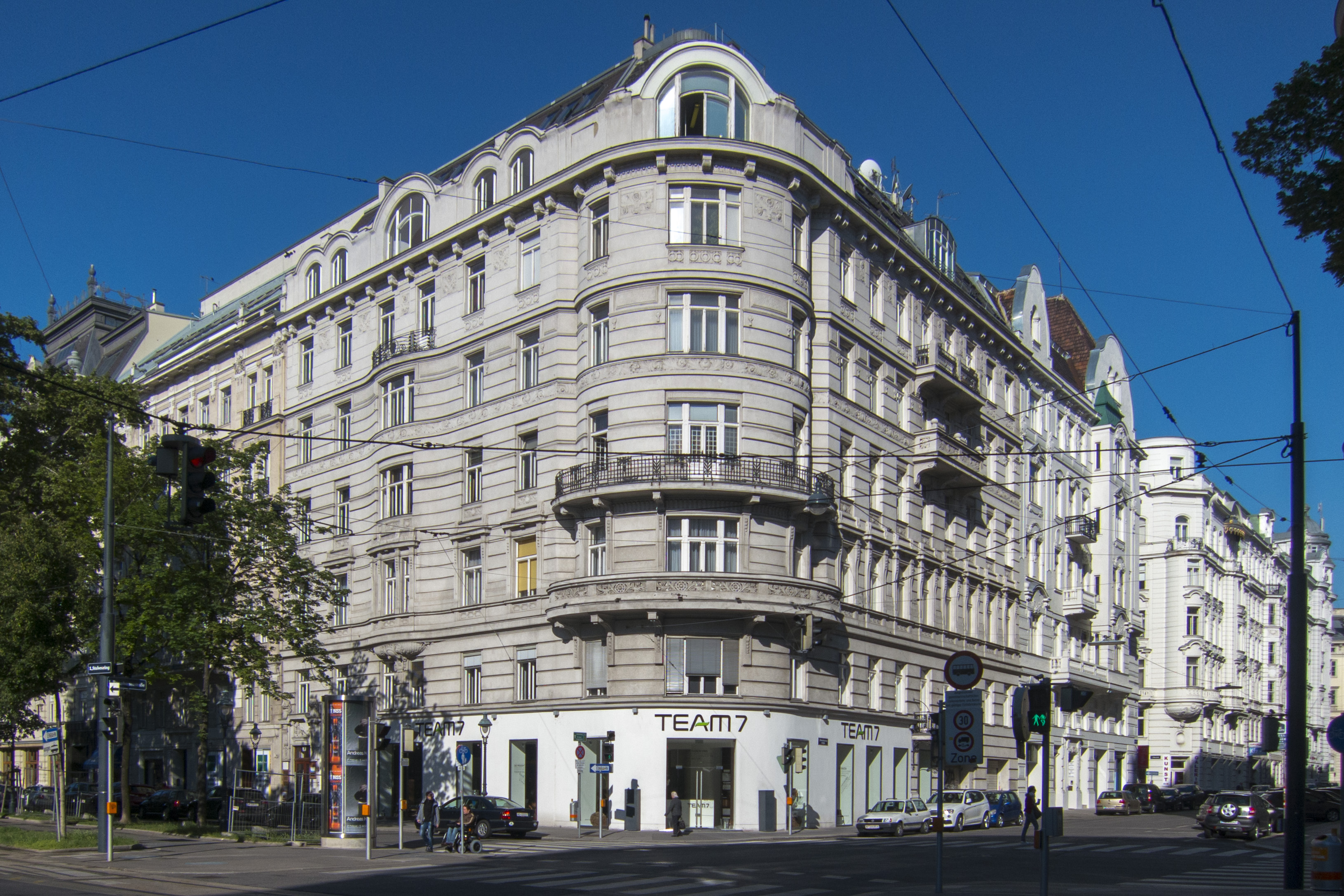
Residential and business house, Vienna, Stubenring 14

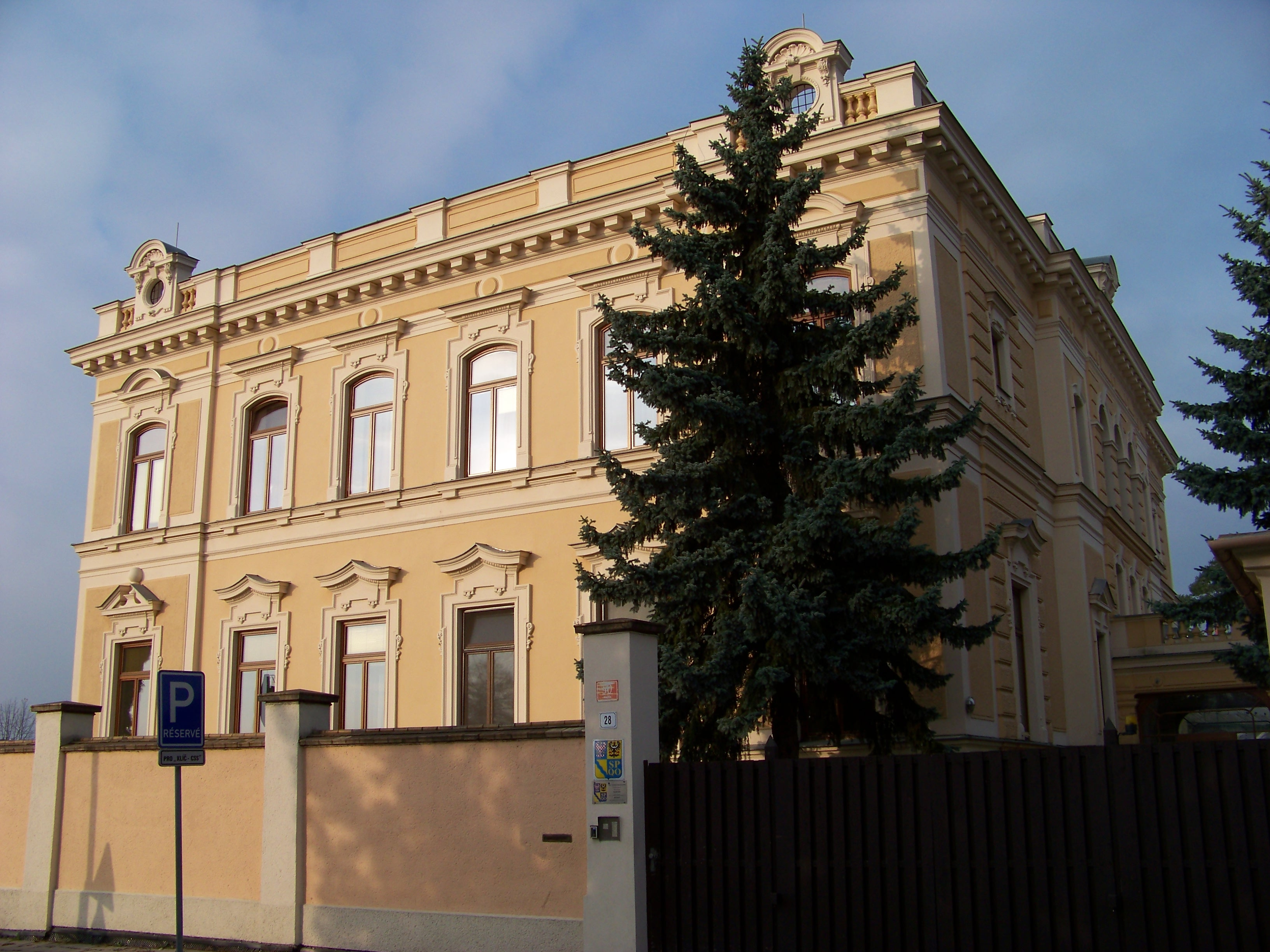
Villa Mayova, Olomouc

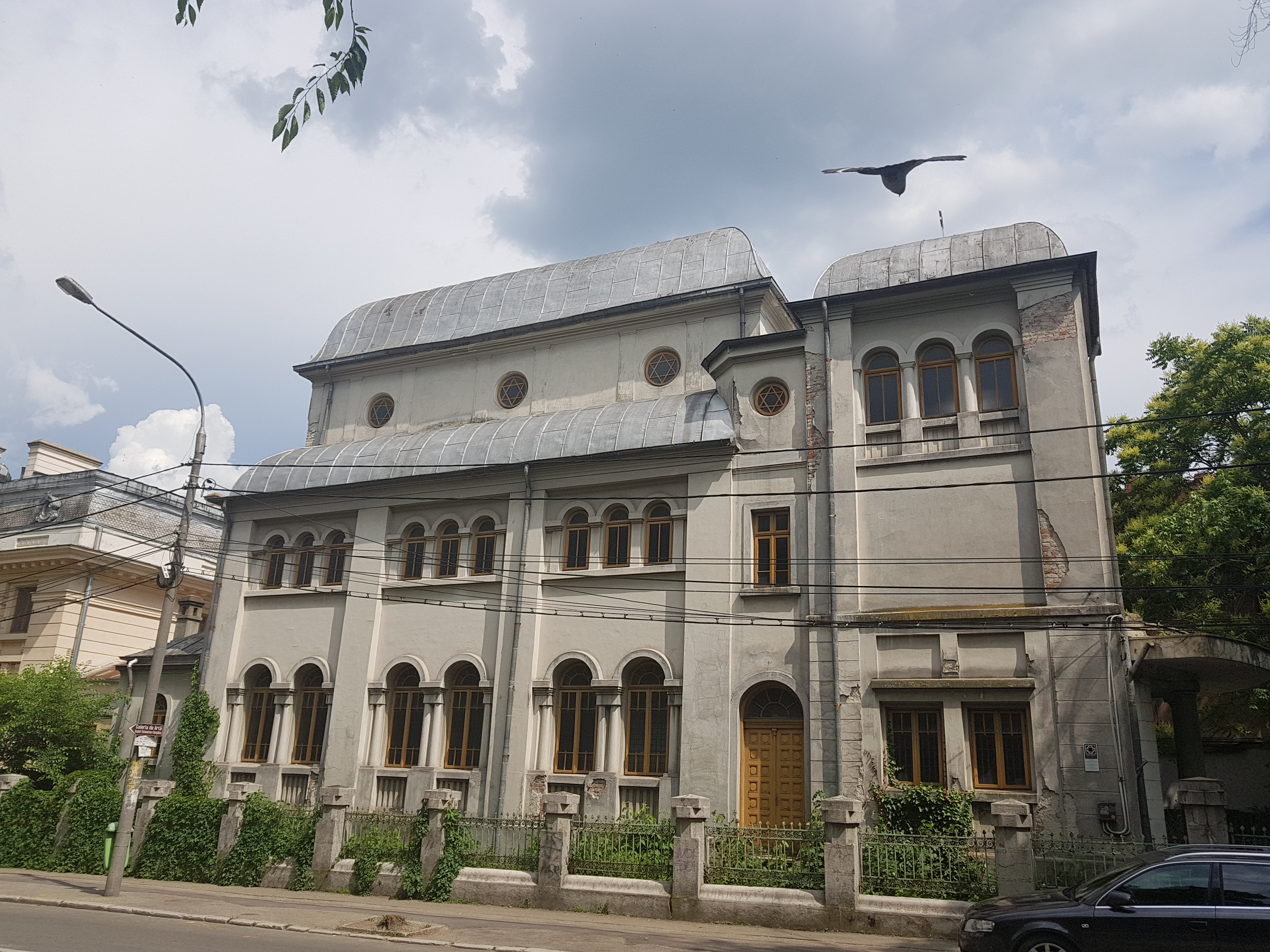
Pitești Synagogue, Pitești, Eroilor Boulevard
