= Status Quo Ante Synagogue (Târgu Mureș) =

Synagogue in Târgu Mures, Romania

Synagogue Status Quo Ante
- Romanian: Sinagoga Status Quo din Târgu Mureş
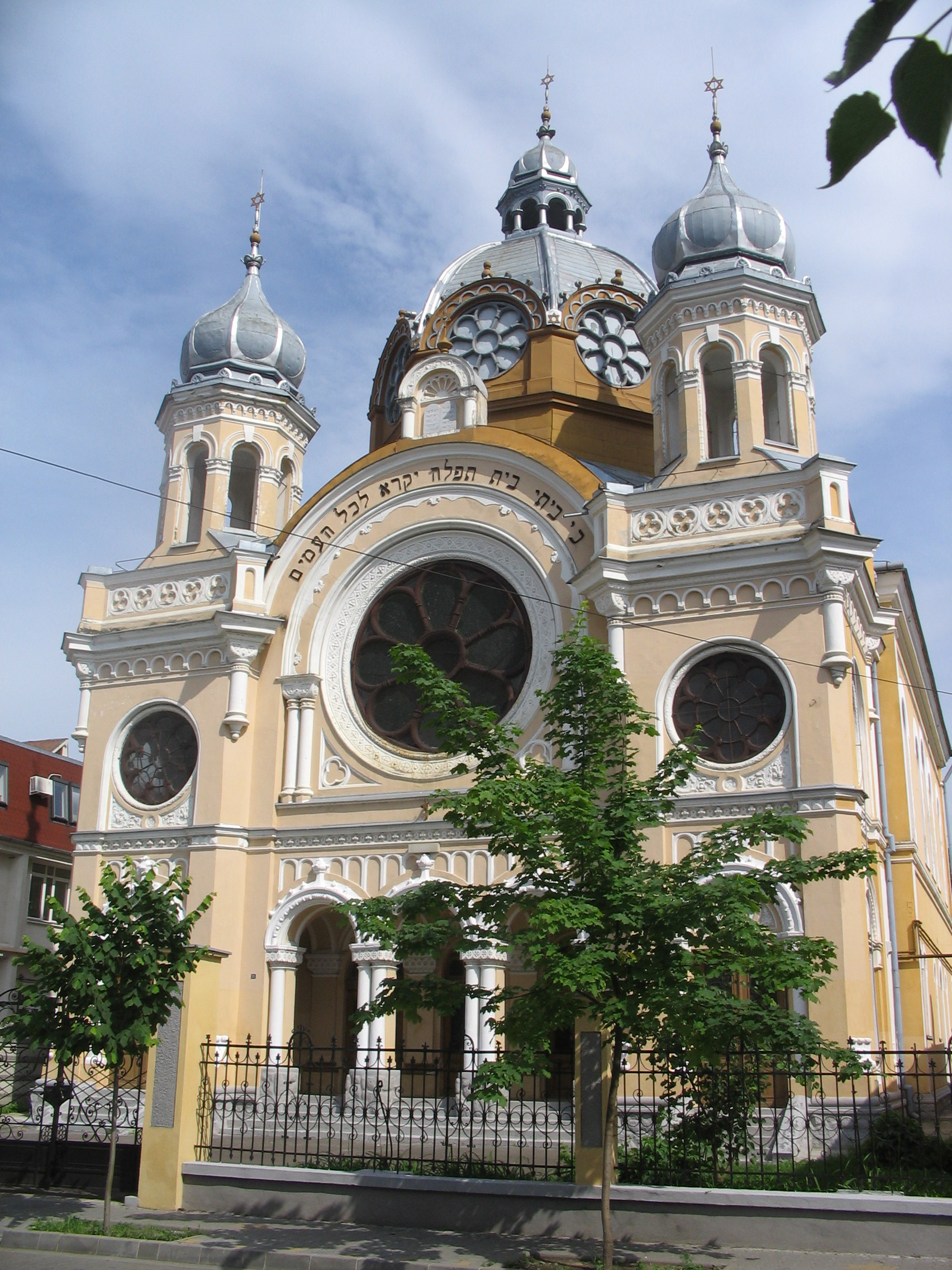
- The synagogue façade, in 2007

- Location of the synagogue in Mureș county

Religion
- Affiliation: Judaism
- Rite: Status Quo Ante; Nusach Ashkenaz
- Ecclesiastical or organisational status: Synagogue (1900–1944); Profane use (during WWII); Synagogue (since 2000)
- Status: Active

Location
- Location: 24 Aurel Filimon Street, Târgu Mures, Mureș county, Transylvania
- Country: Romania
- Coordinates: 46°32′43″N 24°33′29″E

Architecture
- Architect: Jakob Gartner
- Type: Synagogue architecture
- Style: Eclecticism; Gothic Revival; Moorish Revival; Romanesque Revival
- General contractor: Pál Soós
- Groundbreaking: 1899
- Completed: 1900

Specifications
- Capacity: 552 seats
- Dome: Three (maybe more)
- Materials: Brick

Website
- sinagoga.netsoft.ro (in Romanian)

Monument istoric
- Official name: Mureş: Sinagoga
- Type: Monumente de arhitectură
- Designated: 2004
- Reference no.: MS-II-mB-15544

The Synagogue Status Quo Ante in Târgu Mureș (Romanian: Sinagoga Status Quo din Târgu Mureş), also known as the Great Temple in Târgu Mureş, the Big Temple in Târgu Mureş, or the Great Synagogue in Târgu Mureş, is a Status Quo Ante Jewish congregation and synagogue, located at 24 Aurel Filimon Street, (Note: Previously known as No. 21 Școlii street, entrance at No. 23.) Târgu Mureș, in Mureș county, Transylvania, Romania. Designed by Jakob Gartner in an eclectic architectural style, the synagogue was completed in 1900, during the Austro-Hungarian period.

The synagogue was included on the National Register of Historic Monuments in Romania in 2004. (Note: However, the synagogue is not listed on the Lista Monumentelor Istorice 2015, as published by the Ministry of Culture.)

== History ==
=== Jewish congregation ===
The presence of Jews in Târgu Mureș is recorded from 1682. Over the next few decades, the Jewish community in the city grew very quickly, such that by the time Transilvania, under Austro-Hungarian control, was known as Grand Principality of Transylvania, it was second in size only to the one in Alba Iulia.

By c. 1785, the Jewish community in Târgu Mureș had just one wooden synagogue in which to meet, that could fit between 150 and 200 people. By 1870, the community grew to around 1,511 people.

The Jewish population played an important role in the development of the city. Jews would be found amongst a wide range of professions – editors, merchants, industrialists, bankers, doctors and small scale artisans. A youth school was founded in 1880, which moved in 1890 into a house on Horia street. During the 19th century, and as part of the Schism in Hungarian Jewry, a majority of the community moved away from Orthodox Judaism, and adopted the Status Quo Ante appellation, which was specifically used by some Jewish communities in Transylvania, as well as other parts of what was then the Kingdom of Hungary.

The size of the Jewish population continued to grow through the first part of the 20th century, up until the start of World War II, passing 2,755 in 1910 and 3,246 in 1920 respectively, to a peak of 5,693 in 1941. By the time of the Interwar period, the community was operating two synagogues: the Great Synagogue on Școlii street, and another one on Brăilei street, for a total seating capacity of 1,200.

The Second Vienna Award and the annexation of northern Transylvania into Hungary in September 1940 was catastrophic for the Jewish community in the city. By 1944, the city had attracted many refugees from the smaller cities and villages in the area, and the population was estimated to be around 8,000, representing approximately 16% of the population of Târgu Mureș. The Hungarian administration, under instructions from admiral Miklós Horthy (who was at the time regent of the Kingdom of Hungary and an ally to the Third Reich), moved the Jewish population into a ghetto installed in an ancient brick factory.

Between 27 May and 8 June 1944, under orders received from Adolf Eichmann, the Jewish population from Târgu Mureș and the surrounding region was deported to Auschwitz. Almost none of the 7,550 deported Jews survived.

After the end of World War II, most of the survivors of the Shoah moved to Israel. The remaining Jewish community in Târgu Mureș was greatly reduced – in a 1977 census, only 646 Jewish citizens were counted in the entire Mureș County. By the start of the 21st century, the population was further reduced, and was less than 200 Jews in Târgu Mureș.

=== Synagogue building ===
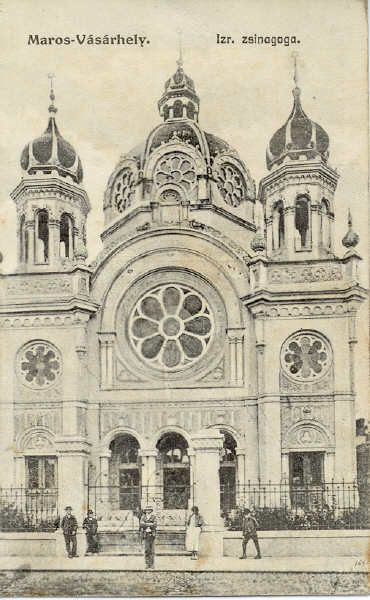
Postcard featuring the synagogue in 1917

The Grand Synagogue in Târgu Mureș was built between 1899 and 1900 during the Austro-Hungarian period, in an eclectic architectural style, following plans provided by the Viennese architect Jakob Gartner, of Moravian descent. The builder of the building was a notable mason and entrepreneur, Pál Soós. The start of construction of the synagogue at the end of the 19th century signaled, for the "Status Quo" Jewish community of Târgu Mureș, a definitive detachment from the Orthodox Jewish community in the rest of Transylvania.

The synagogue was inaugurated in 1900 by rabbi Dr. Joachim Wilhelm, in the presence of leaders of the local Jewish community: Adalbert Burger (president for the community) and Mendel Farcas (vice-president). The inauguration celebrations took place over three days and three nights. A marble plaque, placed in the entrance hall, is marked with the names of principal donors to the construction. The synagogue continues to be known to this day under the familiar name Sinagoga de pe ulița Școlii (the synagogue on School Lane) also in Hungarian Iskola utcai Zsinagóga, despite the eventual change of name for the street, and change of address for the synagogue.

In 1998, with funding provided by the Federation of the Jewish Communities in Romania and by various private donors, a renovation was started, reaching eventual completion in 2000. Significant work was performed, including reinforcing the walls and foundations, interior and exterior restoration, closely matching and following the original architectural designs and paint. Most of the efforts to raise funds, oversee and complete the restoration, and rehabilitate the synagogue, were performed by the president of the community, Bernath Sauber, and by his secretary, Sándor Ausch. The building was re-inaugurated in 2000, supported by international donations totalling more than US $95,000 (including a donation of 30,000 Swiss francs, and support from the Friends of Targu Mures trust in Glasgow).

In 2008, the synagogue was in service, with 552 seats, 314 on the lower level and reserved for men, and 238 on the upper level, reserved for women.

== Architecture ==
The eclectic architecture presents itself as a mix of styles. The exterior displays Gothic Revival (such as the rose windows) and Moorish Revival and Romanesque Revival elements, such as scalloped profiles or domes which borrow from Islamic architecture. As part of the last restoration, the building was repainted in an apricot color, with all of its ornaments and window frames painted in white.

The synagogue is possessed of a large, octagonal, central tower, with small rose windows on each of its sides, and topped by a roof lantern, as well as two smaller, octagonal, towers, topped by onion domes at each of the two corners of the façade. Each tower is topped with a Star of David.

The entrance to the synagogue is a gate with three arcades, separated by twin columns and backed by pillars. Above the entrance, sits a Gothic central rosette with an inscription, quoting the Hebrew Bible in Hebrew: "My house is a house of prayer, for all the people" (Book of Isaiah 56–7).

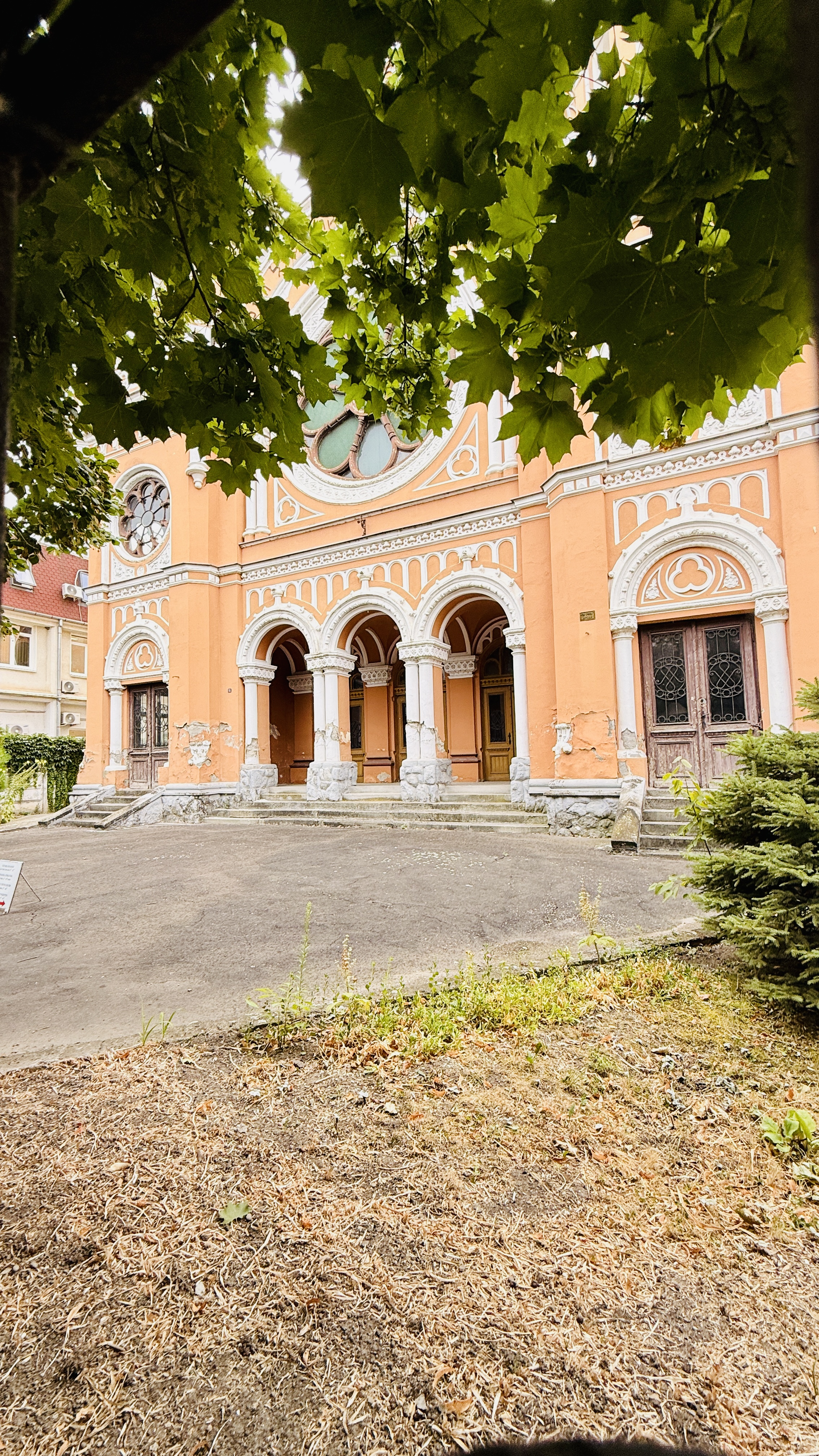
Front lower aspect of the Status Quo Ante synagogue Târgu Mureș, Romania

Roses decorate the two towers, at the façade's corners, on the first floor. The doorways on the ground floor for the two towers open to stairs, allowing women exclusive access to the second floor's seats.

The interior of the synagogue continues in the eclectic style, remaining "luxurious, but in good taste". The architectural forms are brought into relief in the profile of the various arches, the consoles, the various tracery and carved, coloured, elements. The style shows inspiration from roman, gothic and baroque architectural styles and elements, and follows patterns found in Catholic churches built during the same period. The interior is richly decorated, both in shape and in an abundance of colors: the railing for the women's gallery, built out of cylinders separated by geometric motifs, whites inside colored circles on a green background, four rose marble columns, cylindrical on an octagonal base, supporting the cupola from its sides, painted in green, yellow and orange parts on a blue and red background, the central bimah surrounded by a railing in two shades of green.

The rustic wooden benches for the faithful are located opposite the Torah ark in four rows, at the rear of the synagogue, one row on each side of the Bimah and in front of it.

Opposite the entrance is a square apse (the Torah ark) where the Torah scrolls are enclosed, in a semi-circular space supported by two columns, and topped by a bulb dome. Attached to the gate of the Ark, a plaque recalls the memory of the victims of the Holocaust. The inscription (in Hebrew) reads:

"Our city counts 5,943 martyrs. The stones of the walls themselves, and the whole of the Jewish people mourn the extermination of our parents and our dear loved ones who were asphyxiated and burned at Auschwitz in the year 5704 (1944)."

== Gallery ==
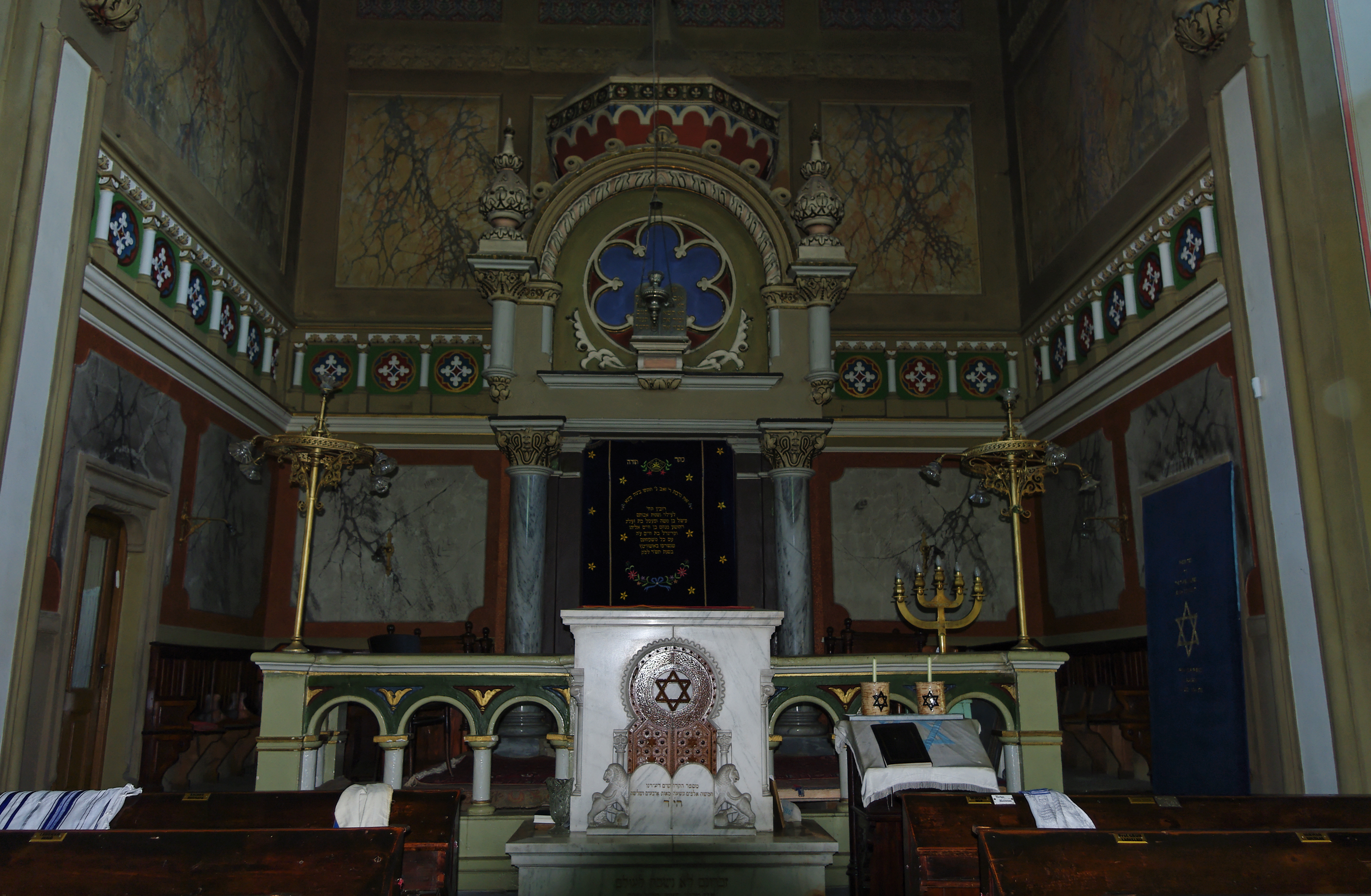
Interior of the synagogue

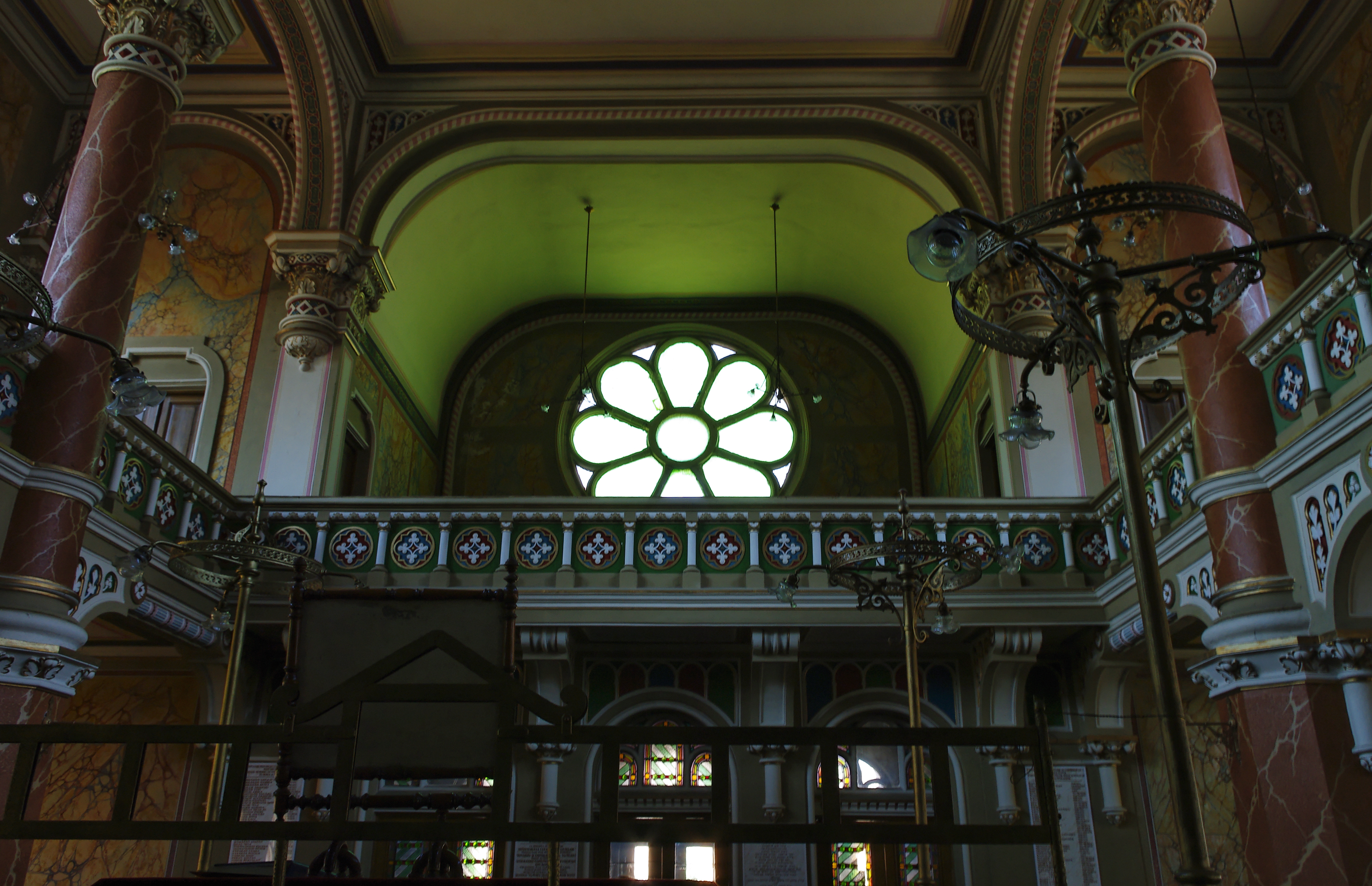
Interior of the synagogue

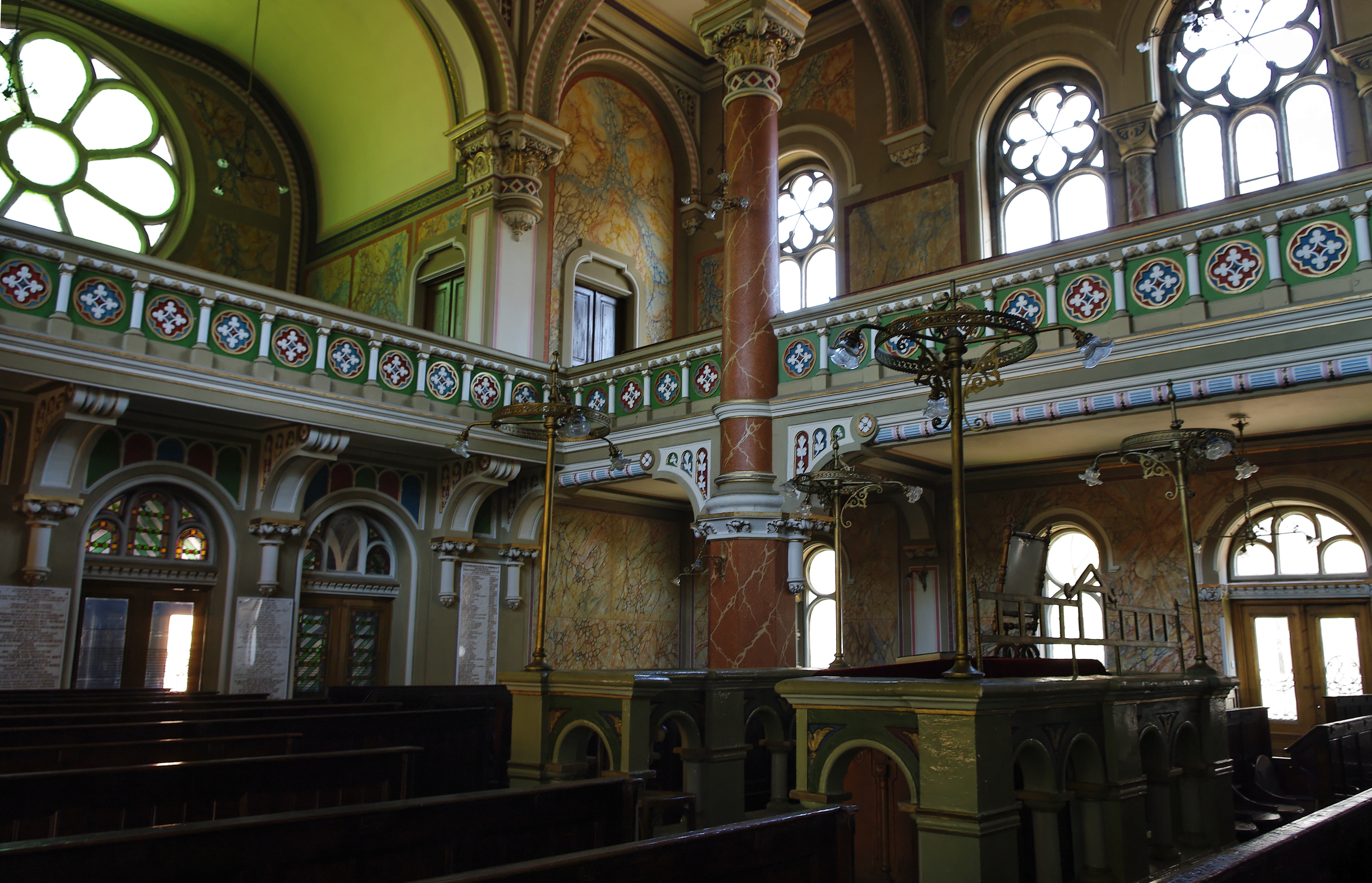
Interior of the synagogue

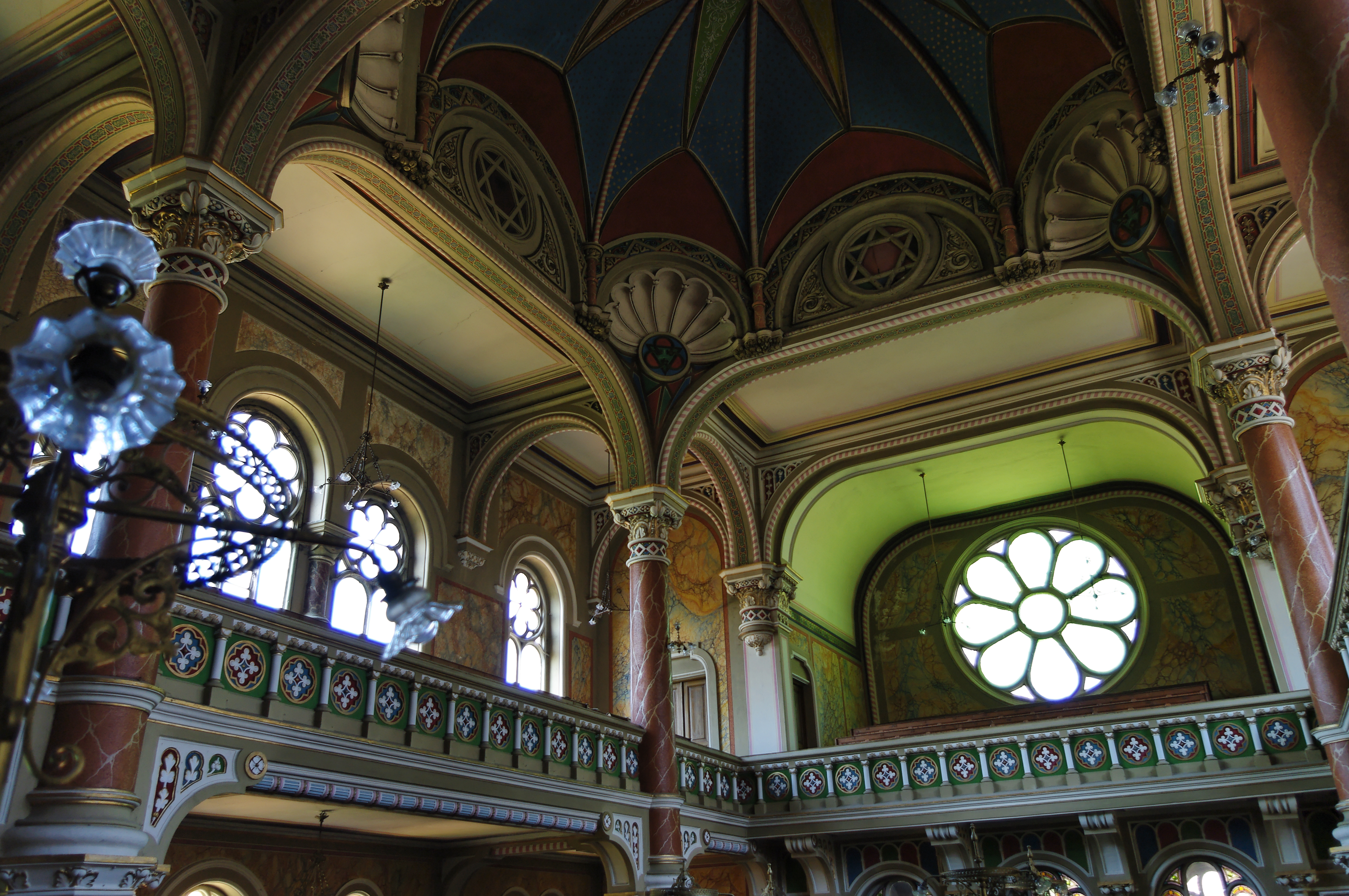
Interior of the synagogue

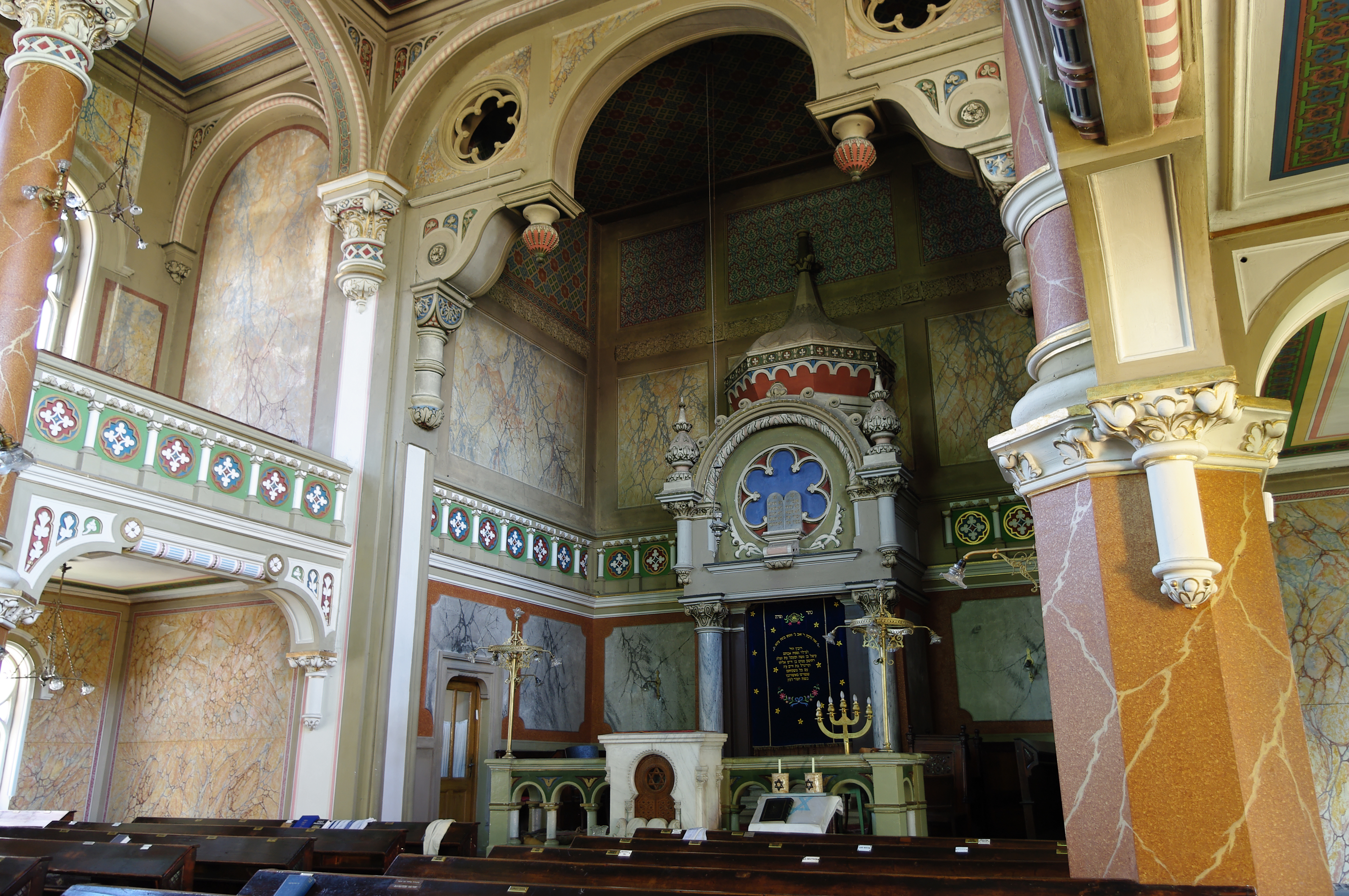
Interior of the synagogue

== See also ==
- History of the Jews in Romania
- List of synagogues in Romania
- Schism in Hungarian Jewry
