= Quo Vadis (disambiguation) =

Quo vadis? is a Latin phrase meaning "Where are you going?"

Quo vadis may also refer to:

== Film and television ==
- Quo Vadis?, a 1901 French film directed by Lucien Nonguet and Ferdinand Zecca
- Quo Vadis (1913 film), an Italian film directed by Enrico Guazzoni
- Quo Vadis (1924 film) an Italian film directed by Gabriellino d'Annunzio and Georg Jacoby
- Quo Vadis (1951 film) an American film directed by Mervyn LeRoy
- Quo Vadis (2001 film) a Polish film directed by Jerzy Kawalerowicz
- Quo Vadis? (miniseries), a 1985 miniseries directed by Franco Rossi
- Quo Vadis, Aida?, a 2020 film directed by Jasmila Žbanić
- Quo vadiz?, an Italian variety show which ran from 1984-1985
- "Quo Vadis?", a 2001 episode of the American television series ER
- Quo Vadis (2024 film), Polish-Indian animated film based on the novel Quo Vadis

== Music ==
- Quo Vadis (band), a Canadian metal band
- Quo Vadis (Dyson), a cycle of poems, 1936-45
- Quo Vadis (Nowowiejski), a 1909 German-language oratorio by Feliks Nowowiejski
- Quo Vadis, a 1909 opera by composer Jean Nouguès and librettist Henri Caïn
- Quo Vadis, a 1947 composition by Sir George Dyson
- "Quo Vadiz", a 1984 song by the Italian group Gladiators which served as the theme song for the variety show of the same name
- "Quo Vadis", a 1994 song by the Australian band Hoodoo Gurus, on the Crank album
- "Quo Vadis", a 1995 song by the Austrian band Imperio
- "Quo Vadis", a 2015 song by the American Band Lower Dens, on the Escape from Evil album

== Other uses ==
- Quo Vadis (automobile), a French automobile produced from 1921 to 1923
- Quo Vadis (horse), an American Quarter Horse mare inducted into the American Quarter Horse Hall of Fame
- Quo Vadis (novel), an 1895 novel by Henryk Sienkiewicz
- Quo Vadis (play), an 1899 play by Stanislaus Stange
- Quo Vadis (restaurant), a restaurant and private club in Soho, London
- Quo Vadis (New York restaurant), a restaurant in New York City that operated from 1946 to 1984
- Quo Vadis (video game), a 1984 video game for the Commodore 64
- Quo Vadis Entertainment Center, a former cinema in Westland, Michigan
- Quo vadis (or Covadis), a slang term for a very short hairstyle originating in African American communities

== See also ==
- Church of Domine Quo Vadis, a common name for the Church of St Mary in Palmis, Italy
- Domine quo vadis?, a 1602 painting by Annibale Carracci
- "Quo Vadis, Capt. Chandler?", a 1975 episode of the American television series M*A*S*H
- Quo Vadimus, a 2000 episode of the American television series, Sports Night
