= Status Quo Ante Synagogue (Trnava) =

Former synagogue in Trnava, Slovakia

- Slovak: Synagóga status quo ante
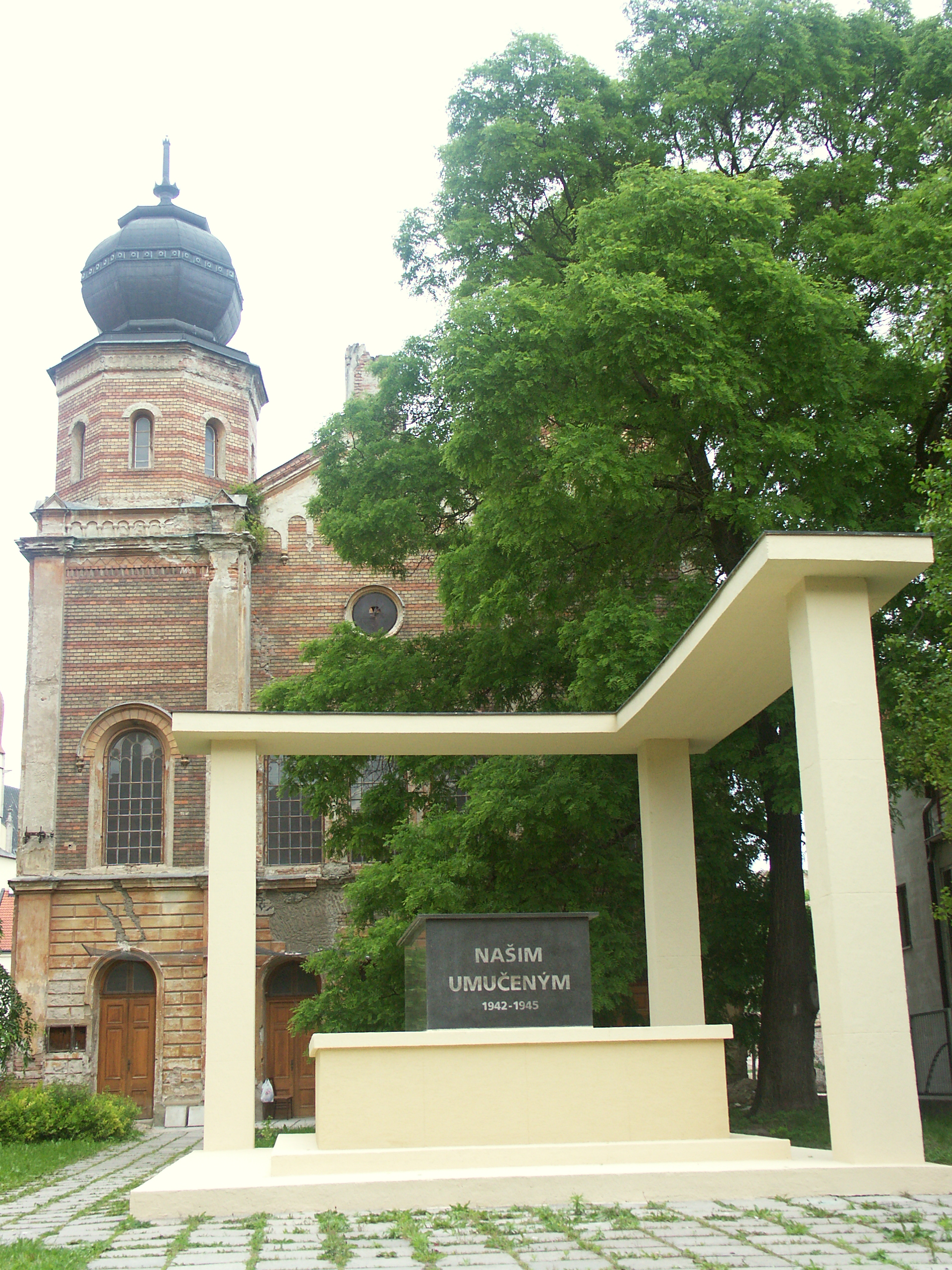
- The former synagogue and memorial plaque

- Location of the former synagogue in Slovakia

Religion
- Affiliation: Status Quo (former)
- Rite: Nusach Ashkenaz
- Ecclesiastical or organizational status: Synagogue (1890s–1940s); Profane use (1940s–2011); Arts center (since 2016)
- Status: Inactive (as a synagogue); Repurposed

Location
- Location: 2 Halenárska Street, Trnava
- Country: Slovakia
- Interactive map of Status Quo Ante Synagogue
- Coordinates: 48°22′41″N 17°35′24″E

Architecture
- Architect: Jakob Gartner
- Type: Synagogue architecture
- Style: Moorish Revival; Byzantine Revival
- Completed: 1890s

Specifications
- Dome: Two
- Materials: Brick

Website
- gjk.sk (gallery website)

The Status Quo Ante Synagogue (Slovak: Synagóga status quo ante) is a historic synagogue located in Trnava, Slovakia. Constructed in 1897 for the local Status Quo Ante Jewish community, it was designed by the Vienna-based architect Jakob Gartner in a blend of neo-Romanesque and historicist styles, featuring a distinctive twin-towered façade. The building served the community until World War II, after which it fell into disrepair and was used as a warehouse before suffering fire damage in 1986. Restored in the 1990s and again in 2015–2016, it now functions as the Center for Contemporary Art within the Ján Koniarek Gallery, with a Holocaust memorial at the entrance commemorating the local Jewish victims.

== History ==
The synagogue was built in 1897 to serve Trnava's Status Quo Ante Jewish community, a moderate faction that emerged in the 19th century as an alternative to Orthodox and Neolog (Reform) congregations within the Austro-Hungarian Empire. Trnava had a long Jewish history, with a medieval community associated with scholar Rabbi Isaac Tyrnau, but Jews were expelled in 1539 following a blood libel accusation and were barred from the city for centuries. Settlement resumed in the mid-19th century, and by 1930, the city had 2,728 Jewish residents divided between Orthodox and Status Quo Ante groups. During World War II, most of Trnava's Jews were deported and murdered in the Holocaust, leaving no active community. Post-war, the synagogue was repurposed as a warehouse and damaged by fire in 1986, though fragments of its murals survived.

== Gallery ==
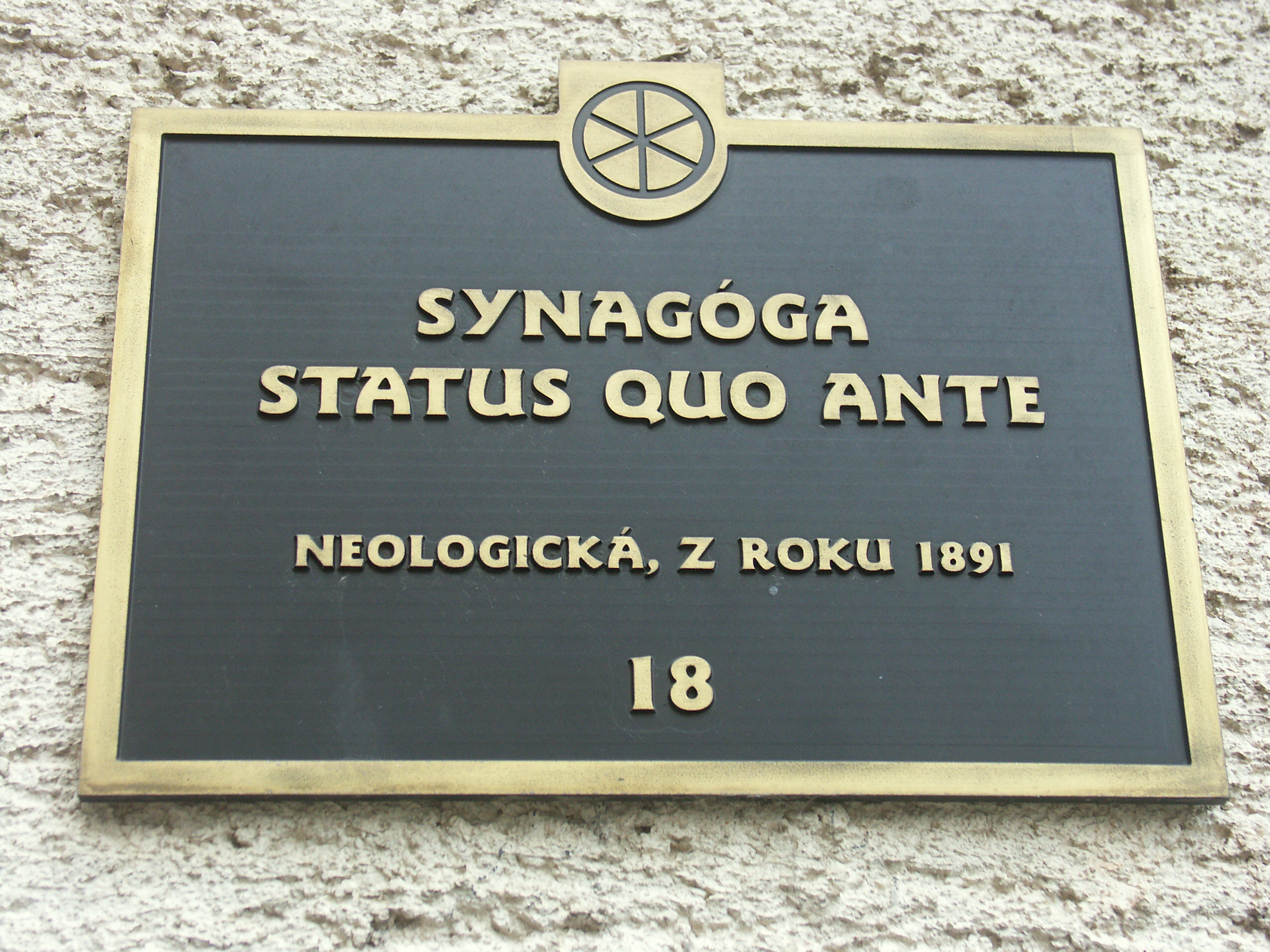
The Holocaust memorial plate

== See also ==
- Controversy in use of the Trnava Orthodox Synagogue
- History of the Jews in Slovakia
- List of synagogues in Slovakia
