= Status Quo Ante (Hungary) =

Term applied to certain Jewish communities

"Status Quo" or "Status Quo Ante" is a term applied to certain Jewish communities in the Kingdom of Hungary and, later, the region of Northern Transylvania of Romania (held by Hungary between 1940 and 1945) after the Hungarian General Jewish Congress of 1868–69. Specifically, the term references communities which, after the schism, opted to join neither the Neologist organization (the "National Jewish Bureau", in the original Hungarian "Az Izraeliták Országos Irodája") – nor the Orthodox communities (organized under what, in 1871, became recognized by the government as the "Orthodox Executive Committee") – and instead decided to retain their previous status(es). They remained without a collective organization or a formally recognized central organization until 1927–28. The term was first used in a newspaper column on 22 February 1871.

Several temples in the region came to be known as Status Quo Ante Synagogue after the schism.

== See also ==
- Schism in Hungarian Jewry
