= Rumbach Street Synagogue =

Neolog synagogue in Budapest, Hungary

- Hungarian: Rumbach utcai Zsinagóga
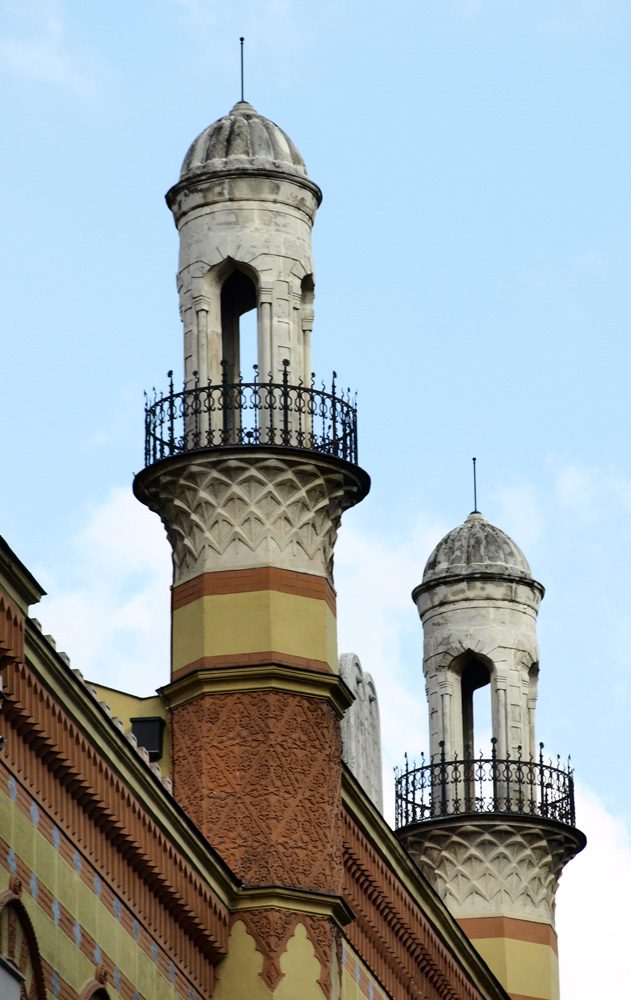
- Towers of the synagogue in 2007

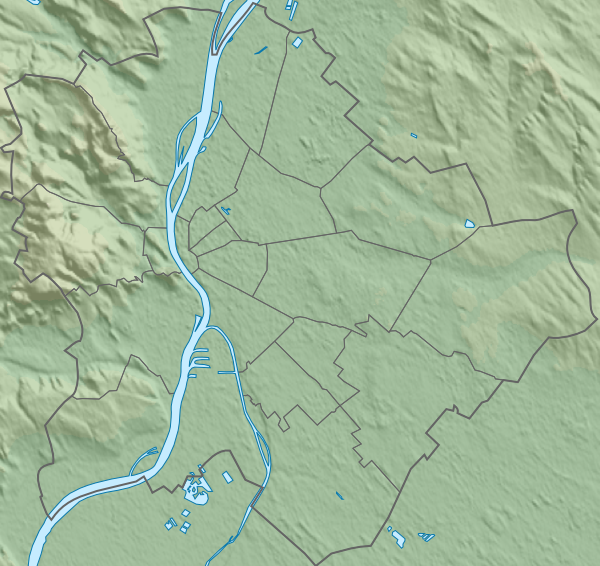
- Location of the synagogue in Budapest

Religion
- Affiliation: Neolog Judaism
- Rite: Nusach Ashkenaz; The Status Quo Schism in Hungarian Jewry
- Ecclesiastical or organizational status: Synagogue; Also, concert hall and Jewish museum (since 2021)
- Status: Active

Location
- Location: Rumbach Sebestyén St. 11-13, Erzsébetváros, Budapest
- Country: Hungary
- Interactive map of Rumbach Street Synagogue
- Coordinates: 47°29′52.1″N 19°3′31.8″E

Architecture
- Architect: Otto Wagner
- Type: Synagogue architecture
- Style: Moorish Revival
- Groundbreaking: 1869
- Completed: 1872

Specifications
- Direction of façade: Southwest
- Length: 50 meters (160 ft)
- Width: 35 meters (115 ft)
- Height (max): 28 meters (92 ft)
- Dome: Two (maybe more)
- Materials: Brick

The Rumbach Street Synagogue (Hungarian: Rumbach utcai zsinagóga), also called the Status Quo Ante Synagogue, is a Neológ congregation and synagogue, located in Erzsébetváros, the inner city of the historical old town of Pest, in the eastern section of Budapest, Hungary. Since 2021, the building has also been used as a concert hall and Jewish museum.

== History ==
The synagogue was built in 1872 for The Status Quo congregation to the design of Otto Wagner, a Viennese architect. Intentionally meant to serve the members of the Neológ community of Pest, its construction coincided with the Schism in Hungarian Jewry of 1869, and it became the home of the more conservative fraction.

Completed in the Moorish Revival style, the synagogue has eight sides and was restored during 2021 with a grant from the Budapest Government. The octagonal, balconied, domed synagogue intricately patterned and painted in Islamic style is exquisitely beautiful. It was built not as an exact replica of, but as an homage to the style of the octagonal, domed Dome of the Rock shrine in Jerusalem.

Historically, but especially since the completion of its renovation in the summer of 2021, the synagogue regularly hosts plays, concerts, photo exhibits and other cultural events.

A modern, revamped and restored building was inaugurated in June 2021. The restoration costs included a US$11.2M grant from the Hungarian state.

== Gallery ==
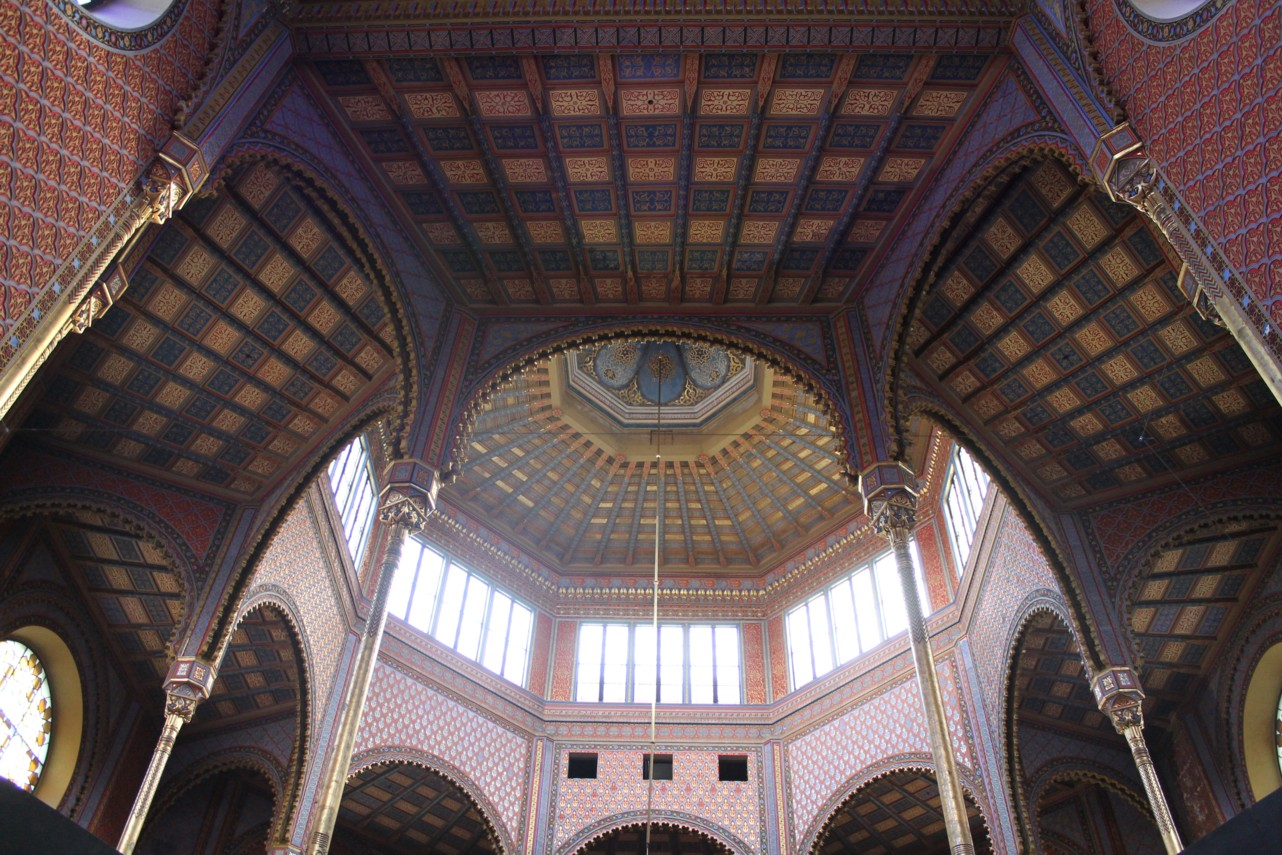
Interior

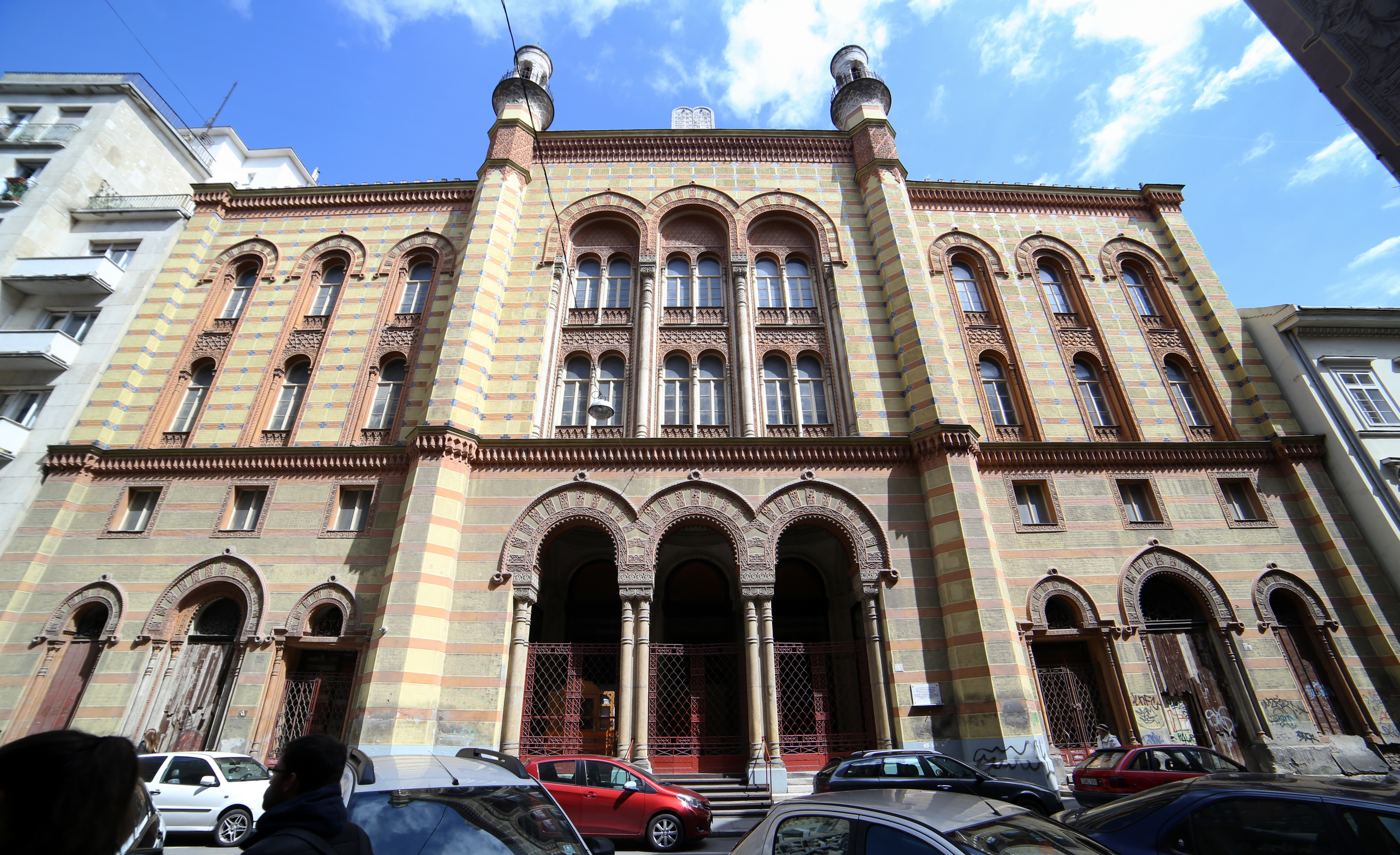
Façade

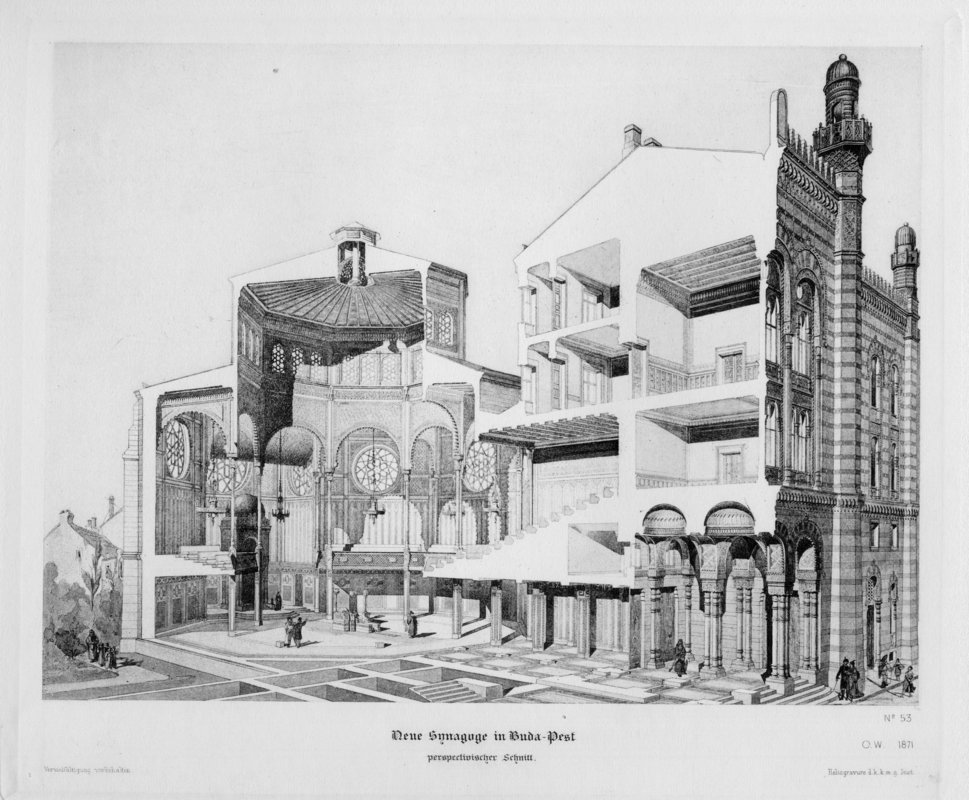
Project by Otto Wagner

== See also ==
- History of the Jews in Hungary
- List of synagogues in Hungary
- Schism in Hungarian Jewry
