= Schism in Hungarian Jewry =

1869–71 institutional split within the Kingdom of Hungary

The synagogue triangle in Erzsébetváros district, Budapest: within a walking distance from each other, the Orthodox, Status Quo and Neolog sanctuaries.

The Schism in Hungarian Jewry (Hungarian: ortodox–neológ szakadás, "Orthodox-Neolog Schism"; Yiddish: די טיילונג אין אונגארן, trans. Die Teilung in Ungarn, "The Division in Hungary") was the institutional division of the Jewish community in the Kingdom of Hungary between 1869 and 1871, following a failed attempt to establish a national, united representative organization. The founding congress of the new body was held during an ongoing conflict between the traditionalist Orthodox party and its modernist Neolog rivals, which had been raging for decades.

The traditionalists, fearing their opponents would dominate the new body, seceded and then lobbied the government to allow the formation of an independent Orthodox supracommunal organization with a policy of strict separation from the Neologs. When faced with the need to choose between the two, a third faction of "Status Quo" congregations emerged, refusing to join either and remaining fully autonomous, without a higher authority. While a large proportion of communities retained a cohesive affiliation to one group, some communities were affected by the schism, and formed two or even three new congregations, with separate affiliations. The threefold pattern remained a key feature of Hungarian Jewry for generations, even in the territories ceded under the 1920 Treaty of Trianon.

Following the Holocaust, the division became less relevant inside the surviving Jewish communities; in 1950, the Hungarian communist government merged the three bodies, forming the National Deputation of Hungarian Jews (Hungarian: Magyar Izraeliták Országos Képviselete). After the fall of communism in 1989, the organization was disbanded, and the split between the different denominations became gradually reinstitutionalized.

== Background ==
=== Modernization ===
Moses Sofer and Aaron Chorin.

Until the late 18th Century, the Jewish communities in Europe and the world at large, possessed a corporate status as did any other group in society, having their own special privileges and obligations. They enjoyed a broad judicial autonomy, enabling rabbinic courts to enforce Jewish Law, or Halakha, while mundane affairs were regulated by the board of wardens, Parnasim, comprising the wealthiest. Interaction with the outside world was limited. Unlike their more open Sephardi brethren in the West, the Ashkenazi Jews of Central Europe were characterized by a strong emphasis on religious studies – while rabbis and others did acquire knowledge in other themes, they did so as autodidacts and not within communal institutions – and cultural and linguistic isolation: they spoke mainly Judaeo-German with poor if any command of the vernacular, and few could read Latin script in addition to Hebrew letters.

The rise of the modern, centralized state combined with the rationalist, secular understanding of the world radically altered traditional Jewish society. As the Catholic Church's authority was curtailed and the nobility forced to pay greater homage to its country of origin, so were the Jews' unique status no longer tolerated in the new order. In the Habsburg monarchy, Joseph II's 1781 Patent of Toleration curbed the rabbinical courts' authority, forced secular education and military conscription, and granted many new economic opportunities. Concurrently, the permeation of Enlightenment ideas severely shook the foundations upon which Jewish self-understanding rested, as a Chosen People predicated on a covenant with God, in exile and awaiting the arrival of the Messiah in Judaism. All this led to growing religious indifference, assimilation and demands to reform Jewish communal life and even Judaism itself.

In the Kingdom of Hungary, the pace of change was slow. The rural character of Jewish settlement – in the 1780s, 60% of them were scattered in groups of a family or two in the countryside; only 15% resided in communities with over 500 members – the country's relative backwardness and the nobility's steadfast refusal to accommodate the Emperor's policies in general greatly delayed the formation of an urban, affluent Jewish class, the like of which embraced Enlightenment and Reform in the German states. While Rabbi Aaron Chorin of Arad was a vocal proponent of religious modifications already in the first decade of the 19th century, his influence in his own country was meager. He served mainly as a rallying point for Hungarian Orthodoxy, led by the uncompromising Moses Sofer of Pressburg, who was determined to forestall any deviation. The conservatives, facing a growing phenomenon of nonobservance, already entertained thoughts of forming separate communities; however, the laws stipulating the existence of only one Jewish congregation in each locality prevented any action towards this end.

=== The Neologs ===
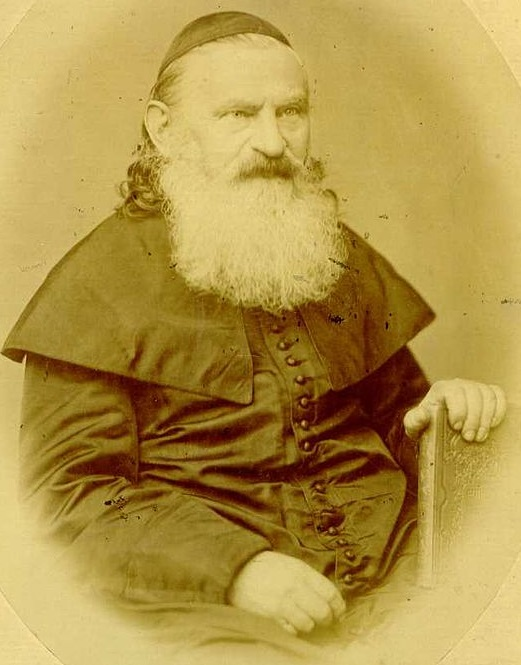
Rabbi Leopold Löw.

In 1827, a prayer quorum that instituted the rite practiced in the Vienna Stadttempel was opened in Pest, becoming an independent synagogue in 1830. The Viennese Rite was designated by Isaac Noah Mannheimer: among others, the cantor wore special vestments, the reader's table – from where the preacher delivered his sermon – was moved from the center and placed in front of the Torah ark, weddings were performed indoors rather than under the sky, and a specialized preacher delivered a sermon in vernacular and in modern style rather than the old Pilpul in Yiddish. Mannheimer also had the prayers shortened by dropping several medieval Piyyutim, though he refrained from any ideological changes in the liturgy; in general, he avoided any principled issue with theological implications and clung to the aesthetic aspect of the service. All these innovations resembled the conduct of a church, and were intended to satisfy the demand by the young and acculturated for decorum and aesthetics. They were also carefully crafted in order not to breach the Code of Jewish Law ("Shulchan Aruch"), thus satisfying also the conservative religious Jews in the Austrian capital.

It was the Viennese Rite, wrote Michael Silber, which chiefly shaped the movement later to be known as "Neology" in Hungary, though the name itself only came to be commonly used in the late 1860s. As opposed to the situation in the German states, the Neologs were not led by intellectual rabbis; the communities' lay leaders were those who introduced the new style, and they were content with changes condemned as merely "cosmetic" by German progressives. The decorous ritual spread rapidly in central Hungary, where the congregations were relatively new and comprised recent arrivals who were mostly assimilated. The north, where communities were much older, remained more strictly Orthodox.

There were, albeit few, religious theoreticians who were identified with the modernized part of Hungarian Jewry. Of those, the most prominent and ideologically driven was Rabbi Leopold Löw. But even he regarded Zecharias Frankel, forerunner of Conservative Judaism, and the moderately enlightened Solomon Judah Loeb Rapoport as his mentors. The progressive Hungarian rabbis rejected the ideas of Abraham Geiger, founder of Reform Judaism, as too extreme. When disciples of the more radical Samuel Holdheim established several congregations during the 1848 Hungarian Revolution, Löw and his circle strongly condemned their members' religious practices and had the victorious Austrians close them in 1852. Michael Meyer wrote that even in the 1860s, "the burning 'reform' issues in Hungary" were aesthetic changes such as the location of the Bimah and of the wedding canopy, which have long since ceased to arouse dissent in Germany and were accepted there by most of the Orthodox. The Neolog rabbinate resisted any change in the laws pertaining to marriage, dietary regulations, the Sabbath and other fundamentals of religion, though they were more tolerant to the nonobservant.

A large proportion of Neolog rabbis identified with the "Positive-Historical School" of Frankel; many were graduates of his Breslau Seminary. When Rabbi Azriel Hildesheimer came to Hungary from Prussia in 1851 to serve as chief rabbi of Eisenstadt and brought with him the ideas of enlightened Neo-Orthodoxy, Neolog-leaning publications launched constant tirades against this "pest", regarded by them as a graver threat than "Old Orthodoxy", which did not offer anything to the more educated Jews. In 1858, Löw published a cynical critique of the German rabbi, stating he was far inferior to Frankel in scholarship and merely an apologetic. In 1859, the tensions between the Positive-Historical and Orthodox in regards to the former's use of critical-scientific approach to the sacred texts exploded. Frankel published his Darkei ha-Mishna ("Ways of the Mishna"), writing – based on several specific examples by traditional sources, like Asher ben Jehiel – that when the Sages cited rulings of unknown origin described as Law given to Moses at Sinai, they meant merely ancient customs accepted as such. Enraged by this subversion of Orthodox dogma, Samson Raphael Hirsch denounced him as a heretic. Löw, Hildesheimer and their supporters participated in the public debate; the former recalled that "Hirsch was branded an Inquisitor, Frankel an apostate." In the 1863–64 Kompert Affair – another event that distinguished sharply between the two schools – that erupted after Heinrich Graetz wrote a treatise that contrasted the traditional concept of a personal Messiah, Löw and other Hungarian rabbis of his camp rallied behind the historian and attacked Hildesheimer, who organized a mass petition against Graetz. The most contentious and practical issue in the religious strife was the Neolog demand, voiced from the early 1850s, to establish a modern Rabbinical Seminary as the only institute that could train certified rabbis.

=== Orthodox reaction ===
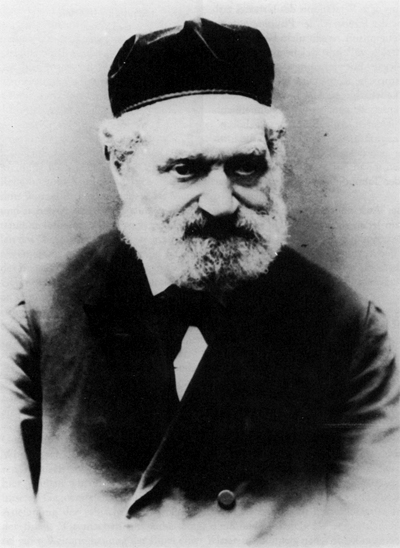
Rabbi Azriel Hildesheimer.

The death of Moses Sofer in 1839 left his followers without a leader. This vacuum allowed the quick rise to prominence of Hildesheimer in the 1850s. The traditional Hungarian rabbis did not share his zeal for secular studies and modernization, albeit in conservative spirit, but he seemed to have the sole answer for the threat posed by the progressives. The Oberlander Jews of northwestern Hungary – modern Burgenland and Slovakia west of the Tatra Mountains, descended of immigrants from Moravia and Austria – were mostly Orthodox, though thoroughly modernized. Many embraced Hildesheimer's views. The Unterlander Jews of the northeast – modern eastern Slovakia, Zakarpattia Oblast and Northern Transylvania – came from Galicia. They resided in the country's most backward regions, barely influenced by the government's modernization efforts, and almost all clung to the old ways. The authorities ordered the creation of Jewish public schools within the communities in 1850: in 1858, while there was a school for every 650 Jews in Oberland, the ratio in Unterland was 1:14,200. The latter was the only part of Hungary in which Hasidism, though frowned upon by many rabbis and laypeople for the changes it introduced, gained influence. It became the base of support for the more radical Orthodox rabbis.

Hildesheimer's virtually uncontested dominance came to an end in the mid-1860s. Firstly, the disciples of Sofer now held senior rabbinical posts and were confident enough. More importantly, he was opposed by a new extremist clique of rabbis, led by Hillel Lichtenstein, who was assisted by his son-in-law Akiva Yosef Schlesinger and his disciple Chaim Sofer. These radicals, though all Oberlander, were popular with the hasidim of Unterland. They regarded themselves as the true heirs of Moses Sofer and vehemently opposed any sort of modernization. They appeared on the scene with the publication of Schlesinger's book "Heart of the Hebrew" (Lev ha'Ivri) in 1863. He and his associates believed Hildesheimer's modernist approach to be the true danger for his public perception as strictly pious legitimized secular influences; Chaim Sofer wrote of him: The wicked Hildesheimer is the horse and chariot of the Evil Inclination, all his successes were not attained naturally, but only because the Archangel of Esau rides him. All the heretics in the last century did not seek to undermine the Law and the Faith as he does.. To them, the Neologs were already totally outside the boundaries of Judaism, and they preached for having them anathematized. Lichtenstein's disciples faced a problem of their own, as their extremist ideology found little support in mainstream Jewish Law: "these issues," wrote Michael Silber, "even most of the religious reforms, fell into gray areas not easily treated within Halakhah. It was often too flexible or ambiguous, at times silent, or worse yet, embarrassingly lenient." To secure his positions, Schlesinger ventured outside of normative Law into the realm of Aggadah (Lore), drawing mainly from Kabbalah and especially the Book of Radiance. In what was considered a relatively moderate statement for him, he wrote "Wherever the Talmud does not conflict with the Book of Radiance, the ruling shall be according to the latter." Their attempt to base their harsh rigidity on these sources irritated the highest Hungarian rabbinical authorities, who while sympathetic to their struggle against modernity could not accept such "unorthodox" means.

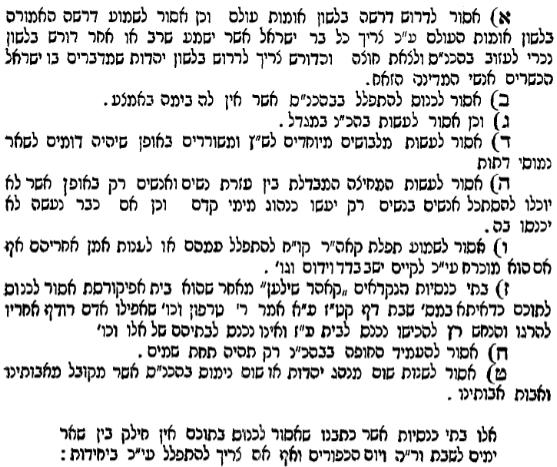
The nine clauses of the Michalovce Decree, printed in the 1869 edition of Lev ha'Ivri.

In the next two years, the Orthodox rabbis of Hungary were split into three distinct camps along consecutive fault lines. In 1864, Hildesheimer seized upon a new Neolog initiative to form a seminary. He argued the Orthodox should accede and simply demand that the institute conform to their principles. The more hard-line rabbis managed to have the government reject the establishment of such a facility. The rabbi of Eisenstadt and the moderate wing, leaning toward neo-Orthodoxy, which supported him were severely condemned and his status was diminished.

The radicals rallied behind the decree of Nagymihály (Mihalovitz in Yiddish), drafted by an assembly headed by Lichtenstein that convened in that city on 27–28 November 1865. The decisions banned participation in modernized services and entry into synagogues that enacted any form of ritual reform – it declared that it was forbidden to listen to a sermon preached in vernacular or to a prayer accompanied by a choir, to enter a synagogue where the reader's table (bimah) was not in the middle of the interior or where the partition in front of the women's section enabled them to be seen by the men, and to attend services performed by a cantor who wore special clothing or a wedding not held under the sky. Synagogues that did not meet any of these demands were branded "Houses of Epikorosy" (heresy), and a blanket paragraph added that any other change in the traditional customs of prayer was generally forbidden. Silber deduced the decree was not primarily aimed at the Neologs, but at the moderates: its clauses were an obvious reference to innovations recently introduced in the Synagogue of Pressburg, the most important traditionalist center in Hungary, such as having sermons delivered in German.

The mainstream wing, which included such prominent rabbis as Moshe Schick and Samuel Benjamin Sofer, rejected both the seminary and the decree. However, while the centrist Orthodox condemned the former, they avoided publicly attacking the latter as Hildesheimer did. Nethanel Katzburg regarded this attitude as signifying the growing dominance of the radical viewpoint among the traditionalists. This ideology, "equating those who made modifications in tradition and custom with transgressors of the fundamentals of faith", also called for complete separation from the nonobservant, and its acceptance heralded the secession to come. While Hildesheimer and his call for rapprochement with modernity were dominant in the previous decade, by the late 1860s it was evident the radicals managed to sway the silent majority toward their views.

== The Hungarian Jewish Congress ==
=== The initiative ===
While calls for forming a national representative organization that would serve the interests of Hungarian Jewry were made in the past, they were unheeded by the authorities. However, the 1867 Austro-Hungarian Compromise changed that. The new Hungarian government, now granted full autonomy, intended to grant a full emancipation for the Jews. On 25 February 1867, a group of delegates from the Pest Jewish community visited the new Minister of Religion, József Eötvös, to greet him. The delegates, headed by president Ignac Hirschler, discussed also the numerous clashes within the Jewish communities, for which there was no internal arbitration mechanism and which forced the authorities to intervene directly. The new government did not separate the church and the state, but pursued a policy of establishing "national synods" to oversee the different religious groups. Eötvös requested the group to present him with a solution to the problems raised. In April, they answered with the proposal to create a unified administrative body for Hungarian Jews, to represent them before the government and manage their internal affairs. In order to determine its character, a national congress of community envoys should be convened. Eötvös accepted.

The Orthodox immediately perceived the new scheme as a plot to subjugate them to Neolog control. Even the moderate Hildesheimer shared this view. Pest was the latter's stronghold; As they were far more susceptible to its Magyarization policies, they also enjoyed government support. By the end of April, a group of conservative Jewish activists in the capital launched a petition to the Minister, voicing their fears that in the planned Congress all matters will be decided by the Neologs. The petitioners formed the basis of the "Guardians of the Faith" (Hebrew: 'Shomrei ha-Dos"), the party that would spearhead the struggle against the Congress. Most of its members were supporters of Hildesheimer's line and quite modern; Rabbi Schlesinger even condemned them as "Shomdei ha-Dos" ('destroyers of the Faith'). Silber commented "it was ironic" that the schism, which was championed by Schlesinger and his milieu for several years, was "ultimately realized by their Neo-Orthodox archrivals." The Guardians' manifest, signed by three of the most prominent rabbis – Ksav Sofer, Jeremiah Löw and Menachem Eisenstädter – signaled the quick turnabout in Orthodox politics. Since the 1848 Hungarian Revolution, the Pressburg rabbinate adopted a pro-Habsburg line while the Neologs allied with Hungarian patriots. The three rabbis' proclamation echoed the need to demonstrate complete loyalty and embrace Magyarization: they commended the Guardians' commitment to spreading the use of Hungarian among the predominantly German-speaking Jews. On 28 December 1867, the recently approved Emancipation Bill came into force. The coming Congress had little to with the principled differences between Positive-Historical and Orthodox positions, which caused much tension beforehand in the intellectual and rabbinical circles. It dealt with administrative matters, and did not reflect the former quarrels: Löw would boycott the Congress and support the Orthodox's right to independence; Hildesheimer, though averse to Hirschler, attempted to prevent a schism. One traditional rabbi considered prominent, Samuel Löb Brill, joined the progressive party in the assembly. What surfaced in the following struggle was not the theological differences between the 70 or so Hungarian rabbis who tended more or less toward the Positive-Historical approach (out of some 350 in total) and their Orthodox opponents, but those between the nonobservant, assimilated laity and the religiously committed.

=== Preparations ===
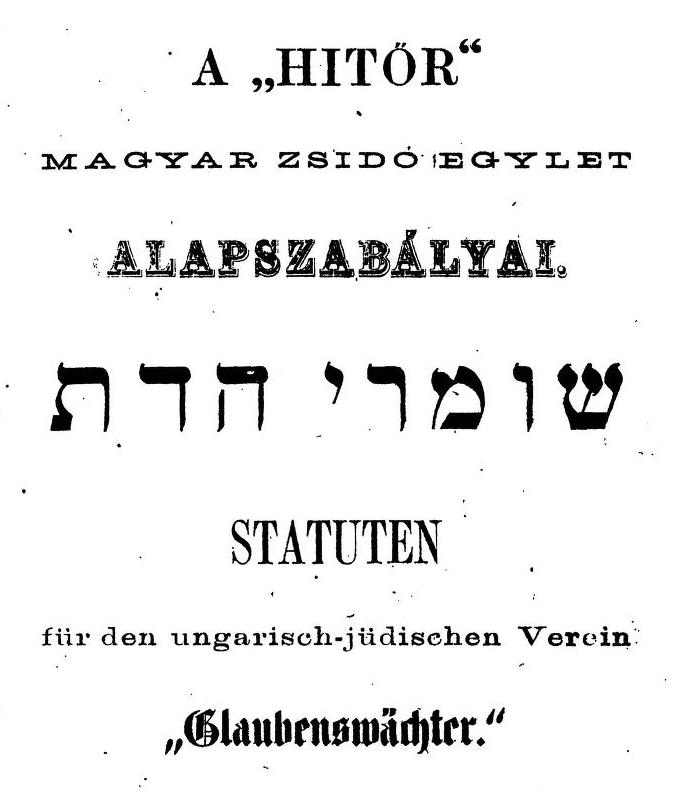
Regulations of "The Guardians of the Faith".

Eötvös held preliminary discussions for the Congress between 17 February and 1 March 1868. The conservative representatives at the meetings were led by Sigmund Krausz, a modern Orthodox who was influenced by Rabbi Samson Raphael Hirsch's struggle to maintain an independent traditional community in Frankfurt am Main. Like Hirsch, Krausz supported modernization hand in hand with strict observance. He stated before the Minister that two different religions existed among Hungarian Jews, the Orthodox and a new one, which were as different from one another as the Catholic and the Protestant faiths, and the government should recognize them as such and allow full independence for the former, including the right to secede from existing communities and forming separate new ones. Eötvös and the liberal representatives rejected this view. Hirschler and the organizers of the Congress declared repeatedly in the following months that the convocation was to deal with administrative issues only. They even requested that rabbis be barred from being elected as delegates to the Congress, to insure that no religious matters would be discussed. The traditionalists opposed this. Krausz was invited by the Guardians of the Faith to serve as editor of their newspaper; he soon came to dominate the party, though he was never elected as chairman.

The conservatives had to deal with the many rifts among themselves. The Guardians of the Faith attempted desperately to win the support of the hasidim in Unterland, and even translated their propaganda material from German to Yiddish for them. However, one of the prominent rabbis who backed the party, Jeremiah Löw of Ujhely, was the most bitter enemy of Hasidism in the country. Rebbe Tzvi Hirsch Friedmann of Olaszliszka demanded assurances that his camp would be represented in the Orthodox leadership. Friedmann also wished that they declare their unanimous opposition to the new compulsory education law, enacted on 23 June 1868, which mandated that every child be sent to a public school. He believed Jewish children should only study in a traditional Cheder, though such conditions were retained only in Unterland. Most conservatives viewed this as untenable. In addition, the Guardians issued a condemnation of the new synagogue in Košice, which was not fitting the Michalovce decree, to please the radicals. When Hildesheimer sent Krausz an angry letter, the latter responded that he himself was in full agreement with the rabbi's positions, believing a seminary must replace the old-fashioned yeshivas and that the spread of Hasidism was as much a danger as Neology; but they had to present a unified front.

On 30 August 1868, Abraham Schag-Zwebner, one of the oldest and most senior rabbis in Hungary, circulated a letter in which he demanded to convene a rabbinical assembly to counter the threat of the Congress; he protested the Guardians of the Faith were never accepted by all as representatives. The latter quickly obliged. The elections for the Congress were held on 18 November; on the 24th, some 200 Orthodox rabbis met in Pest, accompanied by many activists. Benjamin Sofer was elected president. The assembly was short and tumultuous, ending on 3 December. Hildesheimer again tried to promote the seminary. When his motion was rejected without a chance to present it properly, he and some of his supporters withdrew in protest. Another crisis erupted due to Rebbe Friedmann's insistence of opposing secular education. Eventually, the assembled decided to pursue "simultaneous education", sending children to all-Hungarian schools and in later hours to a private Cheder, rather than to support Jewish public schools. The more conservative accepted this, preferring to have gentile teachers rather than Neolog or enlightened Jewish ones, who might turn the pupils away from observance. During the assembly, the elections' results were published. Of 220 delegates, only 94 were considered conservative, and merely 80 were "certainly" Orthodox. As even Hildesheimer could not be relied upon, the Orthodox deduced that any hope to achieve a majority was lost. In spite of fearing to antagonize the authorities, they determined to send the government a declaration that the traditionalists will not accept the Congress' decisions unless they would conform to the laws of religion as interpreted by their rabbis. It was Rabbi Moshe Schick of Huszt, who held no official position, who was the decisive factor in choosing this policy. From that moment he became the de facto leader of the Orthodox, and cooperated closely with Krausz.

=== The plenary ===
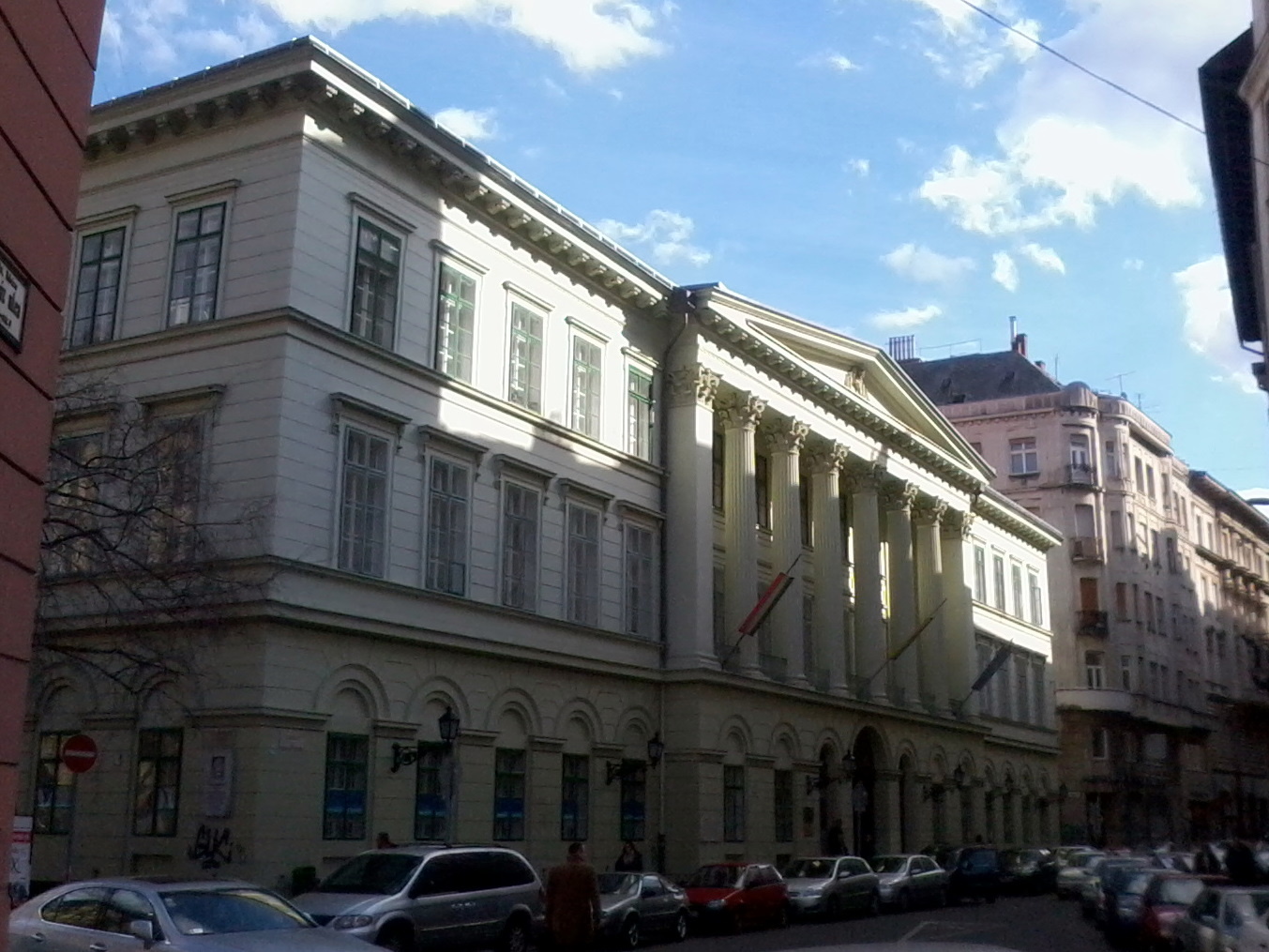
Pest County Hall in Budapest, where the Congress was convened.

On 10 December 1868, the first sitting of the Congress was held in the Pest County Hall, though it officially opened on the 14th. Hirschler, the leader of the modernists who was soon elected president, quickly assembled all delegates who could support his positions and formed the progressive wing of 122 representatives. Hildesheimer wrote in his memoirs that he believed 30–40 of those would have supported a moderate Orthodox agenda. The parallel traditionalist wing comprised 98, and Jeremiah Löw was elected its chairman. The immediate aims of the Congress were to decide the structure of the planned national Jewish organization, on how to implement the new compulsory education law within the Jewish communities and other administrative matters. The conservatives led a moderate line at first, fearing Eötvös would enforce the regulations. They soon abandoned this approach and turned to attempts to bring the Congress to deadlock by various means: among others, they requested that all rabbis in Hungary would sign an approval for the assembly, an act that would have required many months. Hirschler rebuffed these attempts.

On 3 February 1869, the Orthodox issued an ultimatum, signed by 88 delegates, which stated that the assembly must declare that all its decisions would be based on the "Torah and Talmud, as they are interpreted in the Shulchan Aruch." Jacob Katz believed this was aimed to demonstrate their religious freedom was jeopardized, thus providing a cause to withdraw from the council. Schick, in his later report on the Congress, wrote the Orthodox were forced by law to participate with the "Sabbath desecraters", and when the ultimatum was presented, "the President promised mendaciously they will not act against the Torah, but who would be duped to trust him." Hirschler refused to bring the issue to a vote, declaring this was a religious matter and it was not in their authority. Rabbi Jacob Steinhardt of Arad, a leading Neolog, delivered a speech attacking the other party. He claimed they were those who strayed from the Shulchan Aruch by inventing new prohibitions, and denounced them as "pious fools" ('Chasid Shoteh'). On 5 February, progressive delegate Leo Holländer launched another tirade against the conservatives, asking "are the rabbis not wise enough to act without imitating methods from the lands of Bismarck?", a reference to Rabbi Hirsch's support of them. 48 delegates left the assembly permanently, claiming the implied allegation of accepting foreign meddling and lack of patriotism were a severe affront. On 16 February, the Orthodox sent Eötvös a letter of protest, stating they could not believe the King of Hungary and Parliament would sanction the Congress' decisions under such circumstances. It was the first mention of the possibility to intervene in higher circles, beyond the Minister. In the meanwhile, Hildesheimer and his supporters remained. They voiced their approval of simultaneous education, a position they claimed was motivated by patriotism and the wish to integrate; this earned them much credit in the general public opinion later. They also managed to prevent any debate about the seminar, stating that this, too, was a religious issue. On 23 February 1869 the Congress was dispersed, after most of the progressives' proposals were accepted and regulations for the new organization were approved.

== The Schism ==
=== The secession ===
On 24 March 1869, a group of Orthodox rabbis visited Emperor Franz Joseph I in the Buda Castle, requesting their followers be exempted from the regulations. Several activists warned of this move, noting he was now merely a constitutional monarch. The interview had no results, and the Emperor sanctioned the codex on 14 June.

Elections for the local branches of the planned national body were to be held in October and November; the Guardians of the Faith launched a public campaign, exhorting "all those faithful to Judaism" not to participate in the process and announcing they intended to form an organization of their own, for they and the progressives belonged to two different religions. On 22 November 1869, a decree drafted by Chaim Sofer and signed by 27 other prominent Orthodox rabbis, including Schick, Benjamin Sofer, Zwebner, Jeremiah Löw, Meir Perls, Friedman and others, declared that "If we participate in the choosing of candidates, we accept the laws of the Congress, and will be considered bound in one congregation with them... Anyone who yearns to be a Jew according to the Holy Teaching, must not partake in these elections." Andras Kovacs wrote that the traditionalists' success in forwarding their view of the events as a struggle for religious freedom – and respectively, the Congress' supporters failure to present them as a purely administrative issue – turned the Hungarian liberals in their favor.

In early 1870, the Orthodox lodged a petition to Parliament, signed by the boards of 150 Jewish communities and accompanied with Rabbinical statements from across Europe, declaring the Congress' decisions were opposed to religious tradition. The petitioners were supported, among others, by Rabbi Hirsch and the Rothschild family in Frankfurt and by Chief Rabbi Nathan Marcus Adler in Britain.

The issue of religious freedom was in the middle of public attention in Hungary at the time, as the liberals were attempting to limit the powers of the Catholic Church, which was only nominally equal to other Christian denominations. When the matter was debated in Parliament on 16 February 1870, the traditionalist cause was supported by Mór Jókai and Ferenc Deák. After the Neolog MP Mór Wahrmann described the appellants as "those who do not wish to leave the crumbling ghetto walls... Afraid their selfish interests will be endangered if matters would be put in order", Jókai reprimanded him, stating they were impeccably patriotic, as could be seen from their wish to send their children to schools with non–Jews.

Speaker of the House Kálmán Ghyczy, too, asked if "it was necessary to convene the Congress and thus cause a split among our Israelite fellow citizens? Is it acceptable that in religious matters, the majority would force its will on a minority?" The issue was brought before a committee, which concluded it was indeed a religious matter and the state could not apply coercion to resolve it. The Parliament accepted its decision on 18 March 1870 – Shushan Purim of that year, a date perceived by the Orthodox as proof for miraculous intervention. Eötvös instructed his staff to continue forming the organization, but to refrain from obligating anyone to participate in the process. The Guardians of the Faith then requested him to allow them to form a national organ of their own, and his positive reply was given on 18 June.

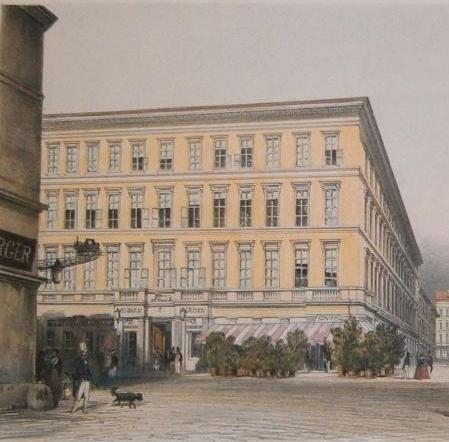
Tigris Hotel, where the Orthodox delegates met in 1870.

After a rapid elections process, 130 Orthodox delegates from across the country convened in Pest on 9 August 1870, in the Tigris Hotel. The debates were quick, and ended on the 24th. A provisional administrative body, "The Autonomous Executive Committee of the Jewish Orthodox Faithful in Hungary and Transylvania" (A magyarországi és erdélyi izraelita autonom orthodox hitfelekezet közvetítő bizottsága) was established, headed by Ignac Reich of the Guardians. The committee was meant to be replaced soon by a permanent directory. In the assembly, the Orthodox declared full allegiance to the Shulchan Aruch. Among other measures, they decreed that a rabbi could be appointed in a community only if he had recommendations from three recognized ones. They decided not to abolish Jewish public schools in communities that already had such, but to enact simultaneous education where there were none. The proposed Orthodox organization had a much looser structure than the Congressional one, and the congregations retained greater independence from the central administration. Eötvös died on 2 February 1871, and was replaced by Tivadar Pauler. On 2 March 1871 the Congressional organ, the National Jewish Bureau (Az Izraeliták Országos Irodája), was formed and immediately recognized by the government. On 15 November 1871, Pauler also recognized the Orthodox Executive Committee. The Schism was now a legal reality.

Across Hungary, communities were torn between the camps. Virtually all Neolog-dominated congregations joined the National Bureau; members of those were known as "Congressionals" (Kongresszusi), though "Neolog" – which entered the Orthodox discourse as a term for the progressives in Hungary not long before the Congress – became synonymous with it. In Pest, by far the largest progressive community, the local Orthodox were among the first in the land to secede, forming a separate congregation that joined the executive committee. In Ungvar, the largest city in Unterland, a small dissident faction that formed already in early 1869 chose to ignore the conservative majority's boycott of the elections to the Bureau, and joined it. Another minority group did so in the heavily traditional Pressburg in March 1872, at the wake of Benjamin Sofer's death. Similar divisions, many stemming from local disputes that could now be institutionalized under the new laws, occurred in numerous other settlements for years to come; in 1888, the Ministry of Religions ordered that those who left an established community were to continue paying their membership fees for five further years, to tame the administrative chaos.

Concurrently, there were many regions in which one of the sides constituted a solid majority, and communities remained unified. While few Committee-affiliated congregations demanded a minimal level of observance, especially in areas dominated by the Bureau, most did not. Even the Hungarian Orthodox, the most fervent in Europe, were willing to tolerate "nominal" members who were far from strictly religious, as long as they accepted communal authority and did not seek to turn their lackadaisy into a matter of principle. Concurrently, those who did not join the committee were disparaged regardless of their personal piety.

=== The Status Quo ===
Already in the beginning of the schism, a third type of community appeared: independent ones, which shunned both the Bureau and the committee. A small number of congregations tending toward Neology chose not to join its national organ. Among the traditionalists, mainly, the rate of affiliation with the committee was slow. Even in Pressburg, the necessary regulations were only accepted in January 1872, after a prolonged and bitter debate. Many conservative community boards were no more keen on joining the official Orthodox establishment than they were in regards to the Congress organization. These independent ones, which remained a small fraction, came to be known as "Status Quo" or "Status Quo Ante", a term that apparently was first used in a newspaper column on 22 February 1871.

There were four main types of such: small communities that split from their mother congregations due to local disputes but chose not to affiliate with the administrative organ of the opposing current; congregations that enacted moderate reforms before the schism, but still employed a traditional approach and were not inclined toward any side; Neo-Orthodox ones, influenced by Hildesheimer, who did not approve of the Orthodox majority; and hasidim, known in Hungary as "Sephardim" due to their prayer rite. The latter's motive was the fear of being dominated by the non-Hasidim ("Ashkenazim"), though they claimed various reasons: for example, that the Executive Committee's regulations did not explicitly ban Sabbath profaners from serving in official positions. Many formed "Sephardi" communities of their own. Several Status Quo congregations were led by prominent rabbis: Jeremiah Löw kept Ujhely independent for the remainder of his life, and so did the hasidic Rebbe Yekusiel Yehuda Teitelbaum (I) in Sighet.

The Orthodox majority's stance towards them was determined in the Košice rabbinical dispute of spring 1872. Rabbi Abraham Seelenfreind was not accepted by most of the congregants in that traditional community, and seceded with his supporters to create one of his own. They stressed their action was unrelated to the national dispute, but was a local matter. The mother congregation joined the Committee shortly after. The Orthodox press monitored the affair closely, warning of the danger the "Status Quo" pose to the committee's stance in the ongoing struggle with the Neologs. Meir Perls, a leading traditional rabbi, wrote Schick in support of Seelenfreind, who he believed was wronged. The rabbi responded in April, writing that considering the nationwide situation, all those who do not affiliate with Orthodox organization are trespassing the commandment "neither shalt thou stand against the blood of thy neighbour" (Leviticus 19:16) for the Neologs are a danger to the spirit, which is even graver than being a physical threat. This responsa, wrote Katz, became an important milestone, granting Halakhic sanction to the committee. The Orthodox declared a ban on all religious functionaries - rabbis, rabbinical judges, ritual slaughterers, circumcisers and others - who remained serving in Congressional communities, stating they will never be accepted among or employed by their congregations. Based on Schick's statement, it was extended to the Status Quo as well. Even the fervently schismatic Samson Raphael Hirsch of Germany, who preached Orthodox secession in his native land, did not always toe the Hungarian line: in 1881, a faction in Hőgyész's unified Status Quo congregation sought to leave it and join the Committee independently. The town's rabbi sent Hirsch a letter stating his community was fully observant and adhered to the Shulchan Aruch. The German rabbi replied that he was right in opposing the secessionists, but asked for his response not to be published openly.

=== Aftermath ===
While the separation between the Orthodox and the rest was an official policy of the executive committee, relations between the sectors were never severed. In the field of burial, especially, many divided communities refrained from forming separate Holy Societies and cemeteries. In spring 1872, Chaim Sofer wrote Schick, proposing to officially proclaim an anathema upon all Congressionals, thus forbidding marriage with them. The Rabbi of Huszt – who, at the very same time, attempted to convince rabbis in Germany to enact similar sanctions against the Reform communities in their country – refused him on practical grounds, stating both the government and Jewish public opinion will not approve. Though several conservative rabbis frowned upon this, members of the different sectors did not cease to intermarry. The ban on functionaries, too, was mainly declaratory. Virtually all candidates to those positions, except rabbis, were Orthodox Yeshiva graduates, and the prohibition created intense competition for jobs among them. Many ignored the ruling and served in Neolog and Status Quo communities, which did not encounter difficulties in that field. The Neologs opened the Budapest University of Jewish Studies, their Rabbinical Seminary, in 1877. The status of the Pressburg Yeshiva, which was recognized as a certified institute for training rabbis in 1850, was not harmed.

The Schism deterred the Neologs, adding to their leaders' motivation to embrace a very conservative line in matters of faith, to avoid a total rift with the other party. Virtually all religious practices were upheld. The National Bureau functionaries feared that a complete break with the traditionalists would vindicate the latter's assertion that the Neolog and Orthodox constituted two separate religions, thus forever undermining their hope to bridge the Schism and represent all of Hungarian Jewry, a cause that they never abandoned. The government recognized the division of the Jews into three organizational 'fractions' ("irányzat") in 1877: the Orthodox communities, affiliated with the executive committee; the Neolog/Congressional ones, affiliated with the Bureau; and the Status Quo, affiliated with none. However, it never accepted the Orthodox claim they were members of different faiths. In 1888, Minister of Religion Ágoston Trefort stated that all three 'fractions', while separate and independent, constituted "one and the same religious denomination" (vallásfelekezethez). A similar position was reiterated by the government in 1905.

Among the Orthodox, the official schism signaled the victory of the mainstream. Lichtenstein left Hungary to serve as rabbi of Kolomyia in 1868, and his son-in-law moved to the Land of Israel shortly after. Chaim Sofer, the remaining radical, served as internal opposition to the Orthodox establishment in the years to come. He constantly blamed Ignac Reich and the other former Guardians of the Faith for being religiously lax and corrupt. He was not in favor of a unified administration at first, and even after having his community of Munkacs join the Committee he continued to demand decentralization. Hildesheimer, too, moved abroad, becoming chief Orthodox rabbi of Berlin in 1869. Rabbi Schick was the unofficial, yet uncontested, religious authority for the traditionalists in the country. After Reich's death in 1896 the Committee finally made plans for a permanent Orthodox organ. On 9 January 1906, the government recognized the Central Bureau of the Autonomous Jewish Orthodox Communities in Hungary (Magyarországi Autonóm Orthodox Izraelita Hitfelekezet Központi Irodája).

The secessionist stance of Hungarian Orthodoxy was the most radical adopted by Jewish traditionalists in Europe. In Germany, Samson Raphael Hirsch's attempt to establish fully separate Orthodox communities met with little success, and most of the conservatives chose to remain within the old unified structures, after reaching various compromises with the Liberal establishment. In Eastern Europe, where demands for religious change were limited to aesthetic alterations in some synagogues at the larger cities, the local rabbis refused to accept the proposals of their Hungarian associates to form strictly observant bodies apart from the general Jewish public, which was turning less and less observant. The 'Hungarian line', as it was termed by Benjamin Braun, reached the Land of Israel through the Verbó-born Rabbi Yosef Chaim Sonnenfeld, who spearheaded the formation of the Orthodox Jewish Community in Jerusalem as an organ independent from the Zionist-oriented Jewish National Council. A similar isolationist stance is maintained by other Orthodox groups originating from Hungary, most notably the Satmar hasidim.

The following table presents the affiliations of Hungarian Jews (from 1920, only in post-Trianon territory):

Year	Congressionals/Neologs (%)	Autonomous Orthodox (%)	Status Quo (%)'	Hungarian Jews (total)
1880	238,947 (38.2%)	350,456 (56.1%)	35,334 (5.7%)	624,737
1910	392,063 (43.1%)	472,373 (51.9%)	45,155 (5.0%)	909,591
1920	300,026 (63.4%)	146,192 (30.9%)	27,092 (5.7%)	473,310
1930	292,155 (65.7%)	134,972 (30.4%)	17,440 (3.9%)	444,567
1944	269,034 (62.1%)	156,418 (36.1%)	7,653 (1.8%)	333,105
1948	106,130 (79.3%)	23,451 (17.5%)	4,281 (3.2%)	133,862

The Hungarian Jewish currents remained intact in the territories lost following the Treaty of Trianon in 1920. In the lands ceded to Romania, Czechoslovakia, Austria and Yugoslavia, the old division between the communities remained institutionalized. In 1926, after the two large fractions received representation in the Hungarian Upper House of Parliament, the Status Quo in the country decided to form an administrative body of their own to make them eligible. On 25 May 1928, the Hungarian government recognized the National Association of the Status Quo Communities (Magyarországi Status Quo Ante Izraelita Hitközségek Országos Szövetségének). All three bodies were officially unified in 1950 by the Communist government, forming the National Deputation of Hungarian Jews (Magyar Izraeliták Országos Képviselete). Following the Fall of the Iron Curtain, MIOK was disbanded and the old division gradually reinstitutionalized in the 1990s.

== See also ==
- History of the Jews in Hungary

== Bibliography ==
- Jacob Katz. ha-Ḳeraʻ she-lo nitʼaḥah : perishat ha-Ortodoḳsim mi-kelal ha-ḳehilot be-Hungaryah uve-Germanyah. Zalman Shazar Center for Jewish History (1995). ISBN 9789652270948. [Translated from Hebrew to English and published as A House Divided : Orthodoxy and Schism in Nineteenth-Century Central European Jewry. ISBN 9780874517965].
- Raphael Patai. The Jews of Hungary : History, Culture, Psychology. Wayne State University Press (1996). ISBN 9780814325612.
- David Ellenson. Rabbi Esriel Hildesheimer and the Creation of a Modern Jewish Orthodoxy. University of Alabama Press (1990). ISBN 9780817312725.
- Margit Balogh, Jenő Gergely. Egyházak az újkori Magyarországon, 1790-1992: kronológia. MTA Történettudományi Intézete (1993). ISBN 9789638312419.
- Anna Szalai. In the Land of Hagar: the Jews of Hungary, History, Society and Culture. Beth Hatefutsoth (2002). ISBN 9789650511579.
- Michael Meyer. Response to Modernity: A History of the Reform Movement in Judaism. Wayne State University Press (1995). ISBN 9780814325551.

=== Articles ===
- Michael K. Silber. The Historical Experience of German Jewry and its Impact on Haskalah and Reform in Hungary. In Jacob Katz, ed., Toward Modernity: The European Jewish Model (New Brunswick and Oxford: Transaction Books, 1987), pp. 107–157.
- Michael K. Silber. The Emergence of Ultra-Orthodoxy: The Invention of Tradition. In: Jack Wertheimer, ed. The Uses of Tradition: Jewish Continuity since Emancipation (New York–Jerusalem: JTS distributed by Harvard U. Press, 1992), pp. 23–84.
- Michael K. Silber. Roots of the Schism in Hungarian Jewry: Cultural and Social Change from Joseph II to the Eve of the 1848 Revolution. (Doctoral dissertation submitted to the Hebrew University, Jerusalem, 1985).
- Nethaniel Katzburg. The Rabbinical Decision of Michalowce 1865. In: E Etkes; Y Salmon, ed. Studies in the History of Jewish Society in the Middle Ages and in the Modern Period . Magnes Press (1980). pp. 273–286.
- Howard Lupovitch. Between Orthodox Judaism and Neology: The Origins of the Status Quo Movement. In: Jewish Social Studies, Vol. 9, No. 2 (Indiana University Press, 2003). pp. 123–153.
