= Pressburger =

Pressburger is a surname. Notable people with the surname include:

- Abrahám Pressburger (1924–2018), Jewish Czech partisan during World War II
- Arnold Pressburger (1885–1951), Austrian film producer
- Emeric Pressburger (1902–1988), Hungarian-British screenwriter, film director, and producer
- Giorgio Pressburger (1937–2017), Italian writer of novels and short stories
- Michoel Pressburger, Austrian haredi rabbi

== See also ==
- Mojżesz Presburger (1904–1943), Jewish Polish mathematician, logician, and philosopher
  - Presburger arithmetic, the first-order theory of the natural numbers with addition
- Bratislava Castle, or Pressburger Schloss in German
- Pressburg Yeshiva (disambiguation)
