= Yozef Yozpa Sofer =

Yosef Yozpa Sofer
- Born: 1819; Pressburg
- Died: 1883 (aged 63–64) en route Hlohovec
- Resting place: Šúrovce
- Spouse: Sarel
- Children: Akiva, Moshe, Raizel (Greenwald)
- Parent(s): Moshe and Sarel Sofer (Schreiber)
- Relatives: Avraham Shmuel Binyamin Sofer (Brother) Shimon Sofer (Brother) Rabbi Yehuda Greenwald (Son in law)

Yosef Yozpa Sofer (1819–1883; Hebrew: יוסף יוזפא סופר; German: Jozseph Jozspe Schreiber) was the third son of Rabbi Moshe Sofer (Chassam Sofer) of Pressburg, brother of Rabbi Samuel Benjamin Sofer and Rabbi Shimon Sofer.

== Life ==
Yosef Yozpa was born in 1819 in the city of Pressburg, Hungary, where his father was serving as Chief Rabbi. His mother Sarel (1790–1832), was the daughter of Rabbi Akiva Eger, Rav of Poznań. She was the widow of Rabbi Avraham Moshe Kalischer (1788–1812), Rabbi of Piła.

He married Sarel (Hebrew: שרל) the daughter of Elchanan from the village Šúrovce (Hebrew: שיראוויטץ). They lived in Šúrovce where Yosef Yozpa was a merchant. Together they had three children, Moshe, Akiva and Raizel. Raizel married the famed Rabbi Yehuda Greenwald (1845–1920).

== Death ==
In 1883, Yosef Yozpa was ambushed and killed in an open field whilst riding to Hlohovec (German: Freistadt(l) an der Waag, Hungarian: Galgóc) by a debt ower. His wagon driver escaped the incident. With no driver reining, the horses instinctly returned to his home in Šúrovce carrying the dying Yosef Yozpa in the carriage. He was found dead upon arrival. He was buried in Šúrovce.

After this incident, his wife moved to the city of Szatmárnémeti (Satmar) where she lived to her last day aside her daughter and son in law. She is buried in the Jewish cemetery there.
