= Pressburg Yeshiva (Austria-Hungary) =

The Pressburg Yeshiva, was the largest and most influential Yeshiva in Central Europe in the 19th century. It was founded in the city of Pressburg, Austrian Empire (today Bratislava, Slovakia) by Rabbi Moshe Sofer (known as the Chasam Sofer or Chatam Sofer) and was considered the largest Yeshiva since the time of the Babylonian Talmud.

== Leadership ==
=== Rabbi Moshe Sofer (Chasam Sofer) ===
Some sources document its establishment in 1803 whilst others cite 1806. The Yeshiva was known as The Chasam Sofer's Yeshiva, or simply as Pressburg Yeshiva. The Pressburg Yeshiva was run as an autonomous institution, without the intervention of the community.

Unlike Yeshivas in Czarist Russia which were forced to operate clandestinely, the Pressburg Yeshiva was recognized by the Austro-Hungarian Empire and its emperor Franz Joseph I. Under the law, the school required the four upper grades to study secular studies. These secular studies were not taught in the yeshiva, but students attended and took exams at another Jewish school in Pressburg run by the orthodox Jewish community. All of the yeshiva's students were exempted from military service; most of the military rabbis who served in the Austro-Hungarian Army were graduates of the Pressburg Yeshiva, and held officers' ranks.

The Yeshiva was founded at the height of the Age of Enlightenment and surge of the Jewish Haskalah movement. As such, the Chasam Sofer stood at the forefront against any reform to traditional Judaism and trained his many students to maintain strict observance of Torah and Shulchan Aruch.

This yeshiva produced hundreds of future leaders of Austro-Hungarian Jewry who made great influence on the general traditional orthodox and future Charedi Judaism. Notable students of the Chasam Sofer were:

- Rabbi Aharon Duvid Deutsch (Goren Duvid), (1813–1878)
- Rabbi Akiva Sofer Reimann (Minchas Sofer), (1818–1898) (son)
- Rabbi Dovid Zvi Ehrenfeld (died 1861), (son-in-law)
- Rabbi Aharon Fried (Tzel Hakesef), (1813–1891)
- Rabbi Chaim Joseph Gottlieb of Stropkov.
- Rabbi Menachem Katz, (1795–1891)
- Rabbi Yisroel Yitzchok Aharon Landesberg, (1804–1879)
- Rabbi Hillel Lichtenstein (Kolomea) (Maskil El Dol), (1815–1891)
- Rabbi Chaim Zvi Mannheimer (Ein Habdoilach), (1814–1886)
- Rabbi Yehuda Modrin (Trumas Hacri), (1820–1893)
- Rabbi Menachem Mendel Panet (Maglei Tzedek), (1818–1884)
- Rabbi Meir Perles, (1811–1893)
- Rabbi Avrohom Schag (Ohel Avrohom), (1801–1876)
- Rabbi Dovid Schick (Imrei Duvid) (died: 1890) cousin of Moshe Schick
- Rabbi Moshe Schick (Maharam Schick), (1807–1879)
- Rabbi Avraham Yehuda Hacohen Schwartz (Kol Aryeh), (1824–1883)
- Rabbi Shimon Sidon (Shevet Shimon) (1815–1891), Rabbi of Cifer and Trnava
- Rabbi Aharon Singer, (c. 1806 – 1868)
- Rabbi Avrohom Shmuel Binyamin Sofer (Ktav Sofer), (1815–1872) (son)
- Rabbi Chaim Sofer (Machne Chaim), (1822–1886)
- Rabbi Naftali Sofer (Matei Naftali), (1819–1899)
- Rabbi Shimon Sofer, (1821–1883) (son)
- Rabbi Shlomo Zalman Spitzer (Tikun Shloime), (1811–1893), (son-in-law), Rabbi of Schiff Shul in Vienna
- Rabbi Yoel Unger (Teshuvas Rivo), (1800–1886)

- Rabbi Yissachar Dov Illowy (Milchamos Elohim), (1814–1871)

=== Rabbi Avraham Shmuel Binyamin Sofer (Ksav Sofer) ===
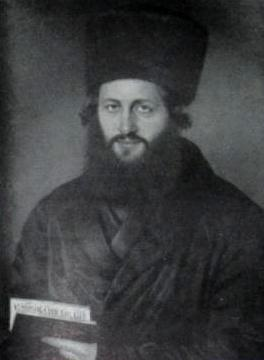
Picture of the Ksav Sofer.

Upon Moses Sofer's death on October 3, 1839, his son, Rabbi Avraham Shmuel Binyamin (known as the Ksav Sofer) succeeded him as Rosh Yeshiva. Like his father, Rabbi Samuel Binyamin was a man of great Talmudic knowledge and of great character. Even the Emperor Franz Joseph, was impressed by him and recognized the Yeshiva as an official theological college. This status exempted students from military service.

Amongst his students were:

- Rabbi Ignaz Grossmann (1825–1897)
- Rabbi Reuven Chaim Klein (1826–1873) Author of Shenos Chaim Chaim.
- Rabbi Shmuel Ehrenfeld (1835–1883), (Chasan Sofer) (grandson)
- Rabbi Jacob Koppel Reich (1838–1929)
- Rabbi Yosef Chaim Sonnenfeld [1848–1932]
- Rabbi Dr. Philip Klein (1849–1926) (Honorary president of the Agudas Harabanim, president of Agudath Israel of America, treasurer of Ezras Torah, Nassi of Kolel Shomrei Hachomos in Jerusalem and vice-president of the Union of Orthodox Jewish Congregations of America)

=== Rabbi Simcha Bunim Sofer (Shevet Sofer) ===
Upon Rabbi Shmuel Binyamin's death on December 31, 1871, his son, Rabbi Simcha Bunim Sofer (known as the Shevet Sofer) assumed both the positions of Rav of Pressburg and rosh yeshiva of the Pressburg Yeshiva which number some 400 students at the time.

The Tiferess Shabboss Society was established in 1883 by students of the Pressburg Yeshiva. The society aimed at awakening learning competition between the Yeshiva students. Every Shabbat, one of the young men was chosen to give a "shiur" on the subject being learnt in the yeshiva.

In 1903 a booklet was published by the Tiferess Shabboss Society, bearing its own name. This book names some 240 students who were learning at the Pressburg Yeshiva at that time. Amongst the young men mentioned are dozens of Hungarian rabbis, including a few Gedolei Torah :

- Rabbi Ya'akov Bender The Young Man (Rabbi of Waitzen - Vác)
- Rabbi Zvi Dikak (Rabbi of Ujhel - Sátoraljaújhely)
- Rabbi Yosef Tzvi Dushinsky, (Rabbi of Galanta, Chief Rabbi of Edah HaChareidis)
- Rabbi Asher Anshel Jungreiss (Rabbi of Csenger)
- Rabbi Zvi Kintzelicher
- Rabbi Menachem Mendel Schick, (Rabbi of Szikszó)
- Rabbi [Shabtai] Sheptel Weiss (Rabbi of Nagysimonyi)
- Rabbi Shmuel Binyamin Schpitzer (Rabbi of Halicz, Miskolc & Hamburg)
- Rabbi Menachem Sofer.
- Rabbi Shlomo Sofer
- Rabbi Shraga Feivel Mendlowitz, (1886–1948)

Other known students were:

- Rabbi Dr. Solomon Breuer (1850–1936)
- Rav Yissachar Shlomo Teichtal (1885–1944)
- Rabbi Benjamin Szold (1829–1902)
- Rabbi Baruch Kunstat (1885–1967)
- Rabbi Klonimus Kolomon Kellner (1883-1958)

=== Rabbi Akiva Sofer (Daas Sofer) ===
In 1907, after the passing of Rabbi Simcha Bunim, his son Rabbi Akiva Sofer (known as the Daas Sofer) assumed leadership over the Pressburg Yeshiva and congregation. The First World War and the resultant breakup of the Habsburg Empire brought tumultuous times to the Yeshiva. Pressburg became Bratislava and passed to the dominion of the new country Czechoslovakia. Countries such as Hungary, Austria, Germany and Poland hampered efforts of students trying to reach the Yeshiva with difficulties attaining passports and visas. Nonetheless, the Yeshiva flourished and continued to operate. After the Czech crises of 1938 and Hitler's invasion of the country, Rabbi Akiva fled Hungary. Upon the advice of his uncle, Rabbi Shimon Sofer of Erlau, he escaped to Switzerland and from there to Jerusalem, where he re-established the yeshiva in the Kiryat Moshe neighborhood.

Amongst his students were:

- Rabbi Yechiel Fishel Eisenbach
- Rabbi Dr. Isidore Epstein

== See also ==
- Pressburg Yeshiva (Jerusalem)
