= Pressburg Yeshiva =

Pressburg Yeshiva may refer to:

- Pressburg Yeshiva (Austria-Hungary), founded in 1807 by Rabbi Moses Sofer (the Chasam Sofer)
- Pressburg Yeshiva (Jerusalem), founded in 1950 by Rabbi Akiva Sofer (the Daas Sofer), great-grandson of the Chasam Sofer
