= Moses Sofer =

Orthodox rabbi

Moses Sofer (Schreiber)
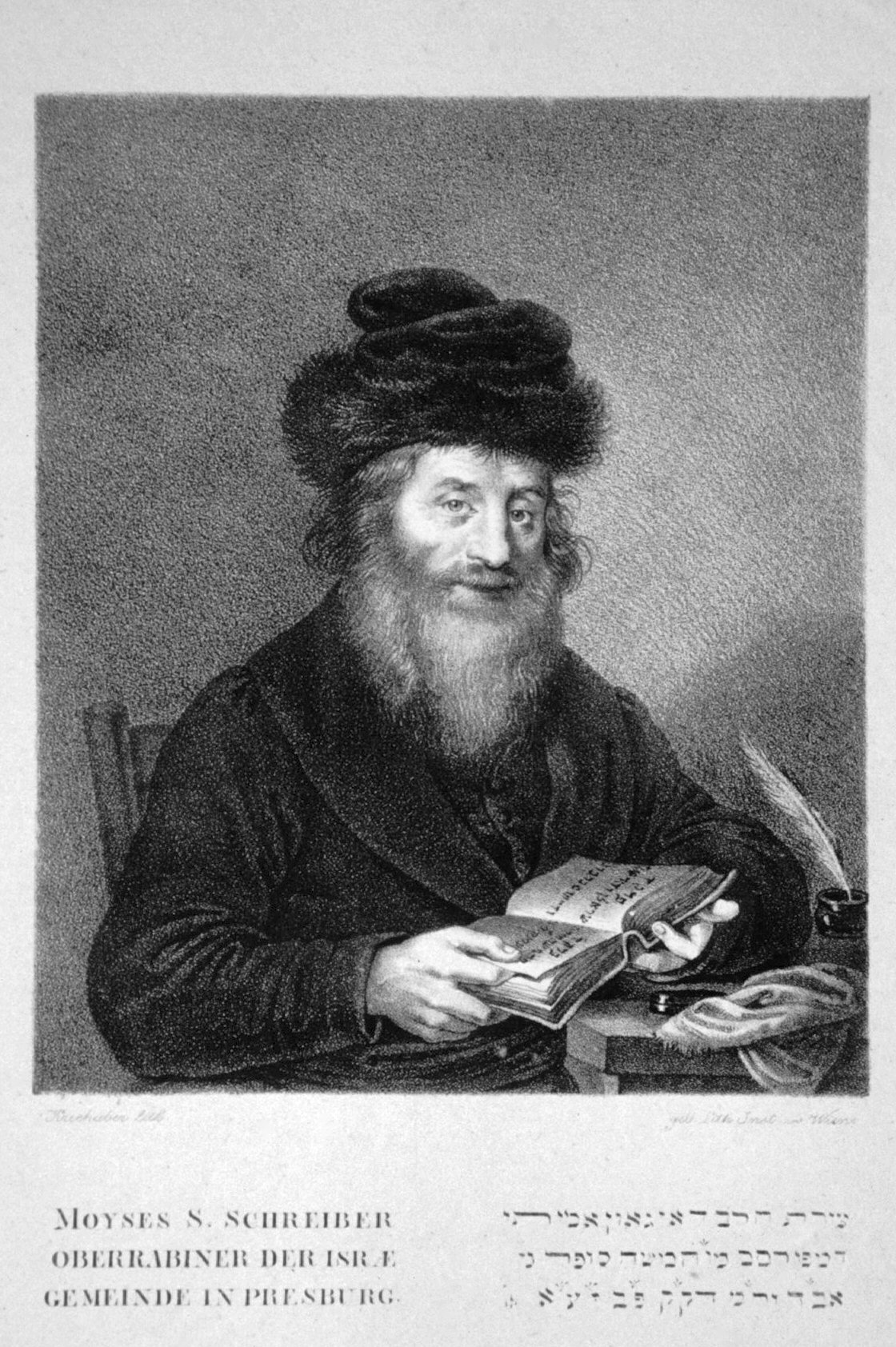
- Sofer in c. 1830
- Title: Chasam Sofer

Personal life
- Born: 24 September 1762 (7 Tishrei 5523 Anno Mundi) Frankfurt, Holy Roman Empire
- Died: 3 October 1839 (aged 77) (25 Tishrei 5600 Anno Mundi) Pressburg, Hungary
- Buried: Chatam Sofer Memorial, Bratislava, Slovakia
- Spouse: Sarah Malka Jerwitz Sofer (1st); Sorel (Sarah) Eiger Sofer (2nd)
- Children: Abraham Samuel Benjamin Sofer; Shimon Sofer; Joseph Sofer; Akiva Sofer Reimann; Yitzchok Leib; additional eight daughters
- Occupation: Rabbi

Religious life
- Religion: Judaism

Moses Schreiber (24 September 1762 – 3 October 1839), Moshe Sofer, (Note: also known by his main work Chatam Sofer, Chasam Sofer, or Hatam Sofer (trans. Seal of the Scribe, and acronym for Chiddushei Toiras Moishe Sofer)) was an Austro-Hungarian rabbi. He was one of the leading Orthodox rabbis of European Jewry in the first half of the 19th century.

He was an opponent of the Reform movement in Judaism, which was attracting many Jews in the Austrian Empire and beyond. As Rav of the city of Pressburg (now Bratislava, Slovakia), he advocated for strong communal life, education, opposition to radical change.

Sofer established a yeshiva in Pozsony/Pressburg (Bratislava), the Pressburg Yeshiva, which became one of the most influential yeshivas in Central Europe, This yeshiva continued to function until World War II; afterward, it was relocated to Jerusalem, under the leadership of the Chasam Sofer's great-grandson, Rabbi Akiva Sofer (the Daas Sofer).

Sofer published very little during his lifetime; however, his posthumously published works include more than a thousand responsa, novellae on the Talmud, sermons, biblical and liturgical commentaries, and religious poetry. He is quoted extensively in Orthodox Jewish scholarship. Many of his responsa are required reading for semicha (rabbinic ordination) candidates. His chiddushim (original Torah insights) sparked a new style in rabbinic commentary, and some editions of the Talmud contain his emendations and additions.

== Biography ==
Moshe Sofer was born in Frankfurt to Shmuel and Reizel.His ancestors were ritual scribes, and from this profession the family name was derived. On his father's side he was a descendant of the Yalkut Shimoni and a descendant of Rashi, likewise he was the great-grandson of Rabbi Shmuel Shattin Katz, called the Maharshal"kh of Frankfurt. At the age of six he began learning Torah with Rabbi Meshulam Zalman Hasid, and by seven, he offered Torah insights of his own. At the age of nine he studied in the yeshiva of Rabbi Nathan Adler in Frankfurt, and after Adler was excommunicated Sofer accompanied him on his travels. At the age of thirteen he was preaching on matters of Halakha. He also studied with Rabbi Pinchas Horowitz, author of the book Hafla'ah, with Rabbi David Tebli Shayar in Mainz and other rabbis. Aside from Torah, he also studied mathematics, astronomy and general history with Rabbi Tebli.

In 1806 he was appointed rabbi in Pressburg (today Bratislava the capital of Slovakia), which was the large and important community in Hungary, there he continued to disseminate Torah in the Pressburg Yeshiva to which came students from many countries whose number reached up to 500. He served as rabbi of the district and as head of the yeshiva about 33 years – until the day of his death, and in parallel also served as a mohel.

In the year 1812, five years after he arrived in Pressburg, his first wife died, and he married Sorl, the widow of R' Avraham Moshe Kalischer and the daughter of Rabbi Akiva Eiger. From this wife were born all his children, four sons (Avraham-Shmuel, Shimon, Yozfa, and Yitzchak Leib), and seven daughters (Hindel, Gitl, Yentl, Simcha, Reichel, Reizel and Esther). In 1832 Sorl died, and after some years Rabbi Moshe Sofer married Chaya, the widow of Rabbi Zvi Hirsch Heller from Altenburg in Hungary.

His disciples established yeshivas throughout all of Hungary and served in the rabbinate in various communities. He was highly respected by well-known Torah scholars, among them Rabbi Mordecai Benet and Rabbi Ephraim Zalman Margolioth. Jews from many communities in Central Europe (Austria, Hungary, the Czech Republic and Slovakia of today) turned to him with Jewish legal questions. He was considered the last posek upon whom one could rely and his rulings were accepted without objection in the Jewish world. Even non-Jewish judges sent him questions pertaining to Jewish law.

=== Death and burial ===
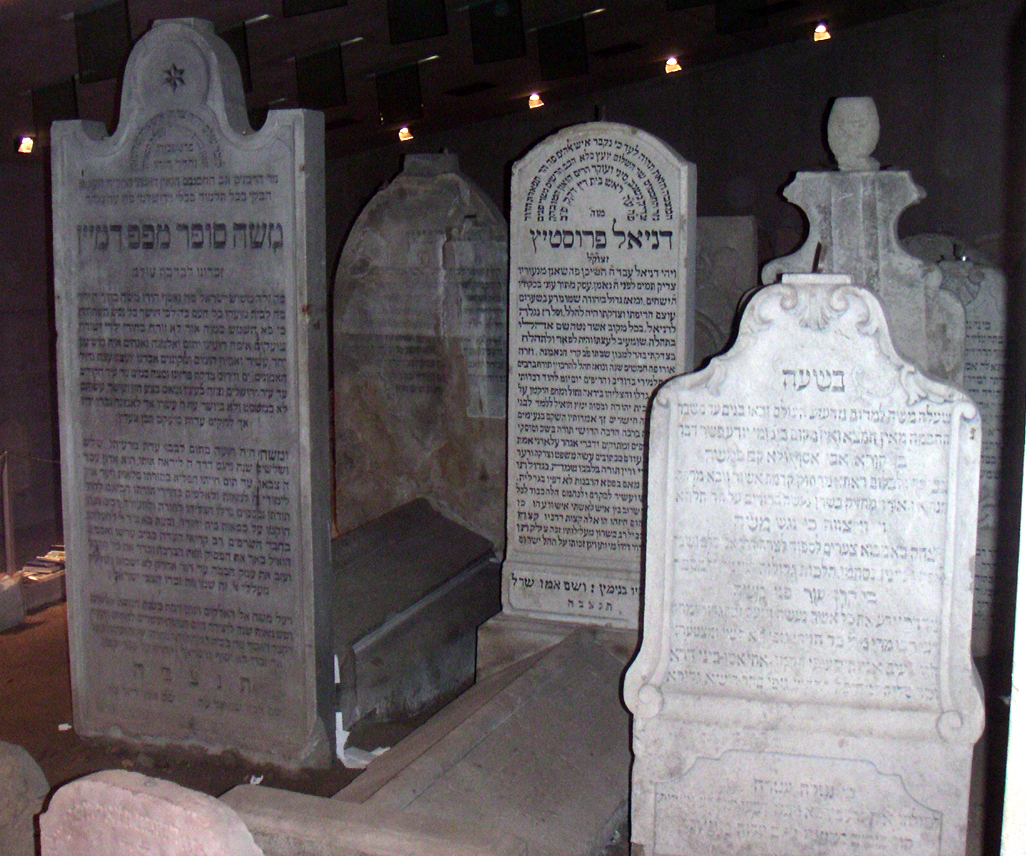
Interior of the memorial in Bratislava, Slovakia (the grave of the Chasam Sofer is at the left)

He died on the 25th of Tishrei 5600 AM in Bratislava. On his grave in the Jewish cemetery an "ohel" (mausoleum) was erected, which constitutes a pilgrimage site. During World War II, when the Nazis began to destroy the cemetery, Moshe Aryeh Leib Wottitz, a merchant and Torah scholar, risked himself and conducted negotiations with the Nazis. He succeeded in bribing them with a large quantity of gold, to prevent the continuation of the destruction and to save the rabbinic section in which the Chatam Sofer is buried. Adjacent to the tomb of the Chatam Sofer there is now a commemorative plaque.

== His attitude toward the Land of Israel ==
The Chatam Sofer had a special attitude toward the Land of Israel, toward living in it and settling it. He saw in the Land of Israel the source of spirituality and the essence of the holiness of the world, and believed that the primary existence of the Torah and the commandments is specifically in the Land of Israel, and that in exile not only is it impossible to fulfill all the commandments, but the Torah in its general wholeness dwells in darkness, and the small amount of spirituality that exists in exile – it too has its source in the Land of Israel. He saw the inhabitants of the land as the most important among the people of the world, and compared the obligation of settling the land to the obligation of laying tefillin:

"As if one would say, I will not lay tefillin because I am engaged in Torah study, so too one should not say, I will not gather my grain because of being engaged in Torah study.

In his sermons he writes: "for the soil of the Land of Israel is more holy than the heavens of the diaspora". He harshly denounced the exile and likened it to a grave, and argued that Israel went into exile because they offended the honor of the Land of Israel and blasphemed it in saying 'a land that eats up its inhabitants'. The expression 'the land of the living' referring to the Land of Israel he explained in its literal sense, that only in this land the people of Israel are considered alive, whereas outside the land the Jews are considered dead, since the exile endangers the existence of the Jewish people. The mishnah "better one hour of repentance and good deeds in this world than all the life of the World to Come" he explained as referring specifically to the Holy Land, that only there life can be superior even to the life of the World to Come.

He held that the bond between the people of Israel and its land was never severed, and therefore the people of Israel wherever they are found are still the children of the Land of Israel, and therefore even at this time there exists a commandment at all times to ascend on pilgrimage to Jerusalem, and even that it is permitted to offer the Passover sacrifice. In his sermons he writes to the broader public: "...and do not be among the haters of Zion who do not want to return and choose to dwell under the kingdoms from our redemption and the salvation of our souls...". The prohibition to turn to gentile courts exists only in the Land of Israel, and not in the diaspora. And even in the Land of Israel he ruled that it is permitted in an exceptional manner to turn to them if it is the only way to save the land of a Jew. He acted for the settlement of the Land of Israel, and even encouraged agriculture and the Hebrew language. He supported the program of Rabbi Zvi Hirsch Kalischer for the renewal of settlement by means of wide settlement, and although he held that the ultimate fulfillment of complete redemption depends on a divine act, nevertheless one must take hold of all natural means for its realization. He believed that even the nations of the world, when they recognize the important role that the Land of Israel fulfills in the existence of Judaism, will not resent the prayers for return to Zion and will not see in them an unpatriotic act.

The Chatam Sofer encouraged in this matter also his disciples. Several of his disciples ascended to the Land of Israel and established the Kolel Bnei Hungaria in Jerusalem. One of his distinguished disciples who ascended to the Land of Israel by his command was Rabbi Yitzchak Prager Oflatka, who also served as the head of the kolel. The members of the kolel were among the founders of Petah Tikva and among them were also the famous opponents of Zionism (for example – Rabbi Abraham Zwebner). The Chatam Sofer ruled that supporting the poor in the Land of Israel is more important than building a synagogue in Jerusalem.

== His opposition to secularization and reform ==
The days of the Chatam Sofer were the days of the beginning of Jewish emancipation in Western Europe. Following the granting of rights to the Jews, the walls separating Jews from their surroundings were broken. These also led to the process of enlightenment, secularization and the beginning of the Reform movement. The Chatam Sofer not only did not rejoice in the emancipation, but saw in it a great harm and a temptation that would lead to non-observance of commandments and to assimilation:

"The trouble is the opposite, that the government gives freedom to Israel and elevates them and brings them closer, and it is a greater trouble than the first, that due to our many sins all the aim of Israel then is to draw close to the ministers of kingdom and to go in their statutes and to abandon Torah and commandments of their own will. And this is called enslavement and not servitude. For they are free men from servitude, but the impurity of the land rules over them."

In the Reform movement the Chatam Sofer saw a great danger, and therefore became one of its leading opponents, when he coined the slogan "Chadash asur min haTorah" ("innovation is forbidden by the Torah"). In origin this phrase is said regarding the prohibition of eating from the new grain (called "chadash") before the waving of the Omer in the Temple in Jerusalem. The Chatam Sofer gave this mishnah a new meaning – that any change in the commandments and customs of Israel is forbidden, solely because it is a novelty, even if it does not contradict the Talmud and the decisors. He emphasized that changes in religion, even the smallest ones, can undermine the power of Judaism. According to his view, for this reason any innovation in Jewish life is forbidden by the Torah, and every custom that Israel has practiced is considered like a "vow made in public," whose violation entails the prohibition of "he shall not profane his word".

In 1811, the Chatam Sofer acted successfully to prevent the opening of a school in Pressburg in which they planned to teach also secular studies. Later the Maskilim conducted a campaign to close the Pressburg Yeshiva and failed after a determined struggle by him. In the year 1819 he supported the Hamburg Rabbinical Court in their stance against the establishment of a Reform synagogue in their city ("the Temple dispute") in which the parts in the prayer dealing with the coming of the redeemer were canceled and others were said in German, all accompanied by organ music. He defined these changes as a deviation from the tradition of Israel.

Historical research sees in the Chatam Sofer the first rabbi who can be defined as orthodox; while many of his contemporaries, such as the Noda biYehuda, still related to the early Maskilim and Reformers as isolated phenomena requiring local treatment, he formulated a comprehensive and wide response and championed an uncompromising confrontation with them, out of an understanding that his powers as Mara d'Atra were being eroded by the great changes in Jewish society. If previously the community had legal authorities to enforce the halakha on its members, these were increasingly restricted by the government. The growing integration into the environment made the acceptance of religious law more and more a matter of personal choice. When he was asked regarding the rabbis who supported the position of the builders of the Reform temple, he responded on 25 January 1819 — that if the matter were in his hands he would remove them entirely from the community of Israel:

"If their judgment were handed over into our hands, my opinion would be to separate them from our borders. None of our daughters shall be given to their sons, nor from their sons to our daughters, so that they should not come to be drawn after them. And their community shall be like the community of Tzadok and Baytos — Anan and Saul. They by themselves and we by ourselves. All this appears to me as the halakha but not for actual implementation without the permission of the king, may his majesty be exalted. And without this my words should be null and considered as nothing."

== His attitude toward wisdoms and sciences ==
Despite his opposition to change in the order of prayer and in traditional dress, the Chatam Sofer held that one may also study general studies on condition that they come after Torah study. His main concern was that enlightenment would serve as a gateway to assimilation, when it is not accompanied by proper Jewish consciousness, and therefore he was reserved about it in several places. The blessing "who has given us the Torah of truth, and planted eternal life within us" he interpreted: "Torah of truth" is the Torah, and "eternal life" is sciences and worldly manners of this world. First Torah and afterward science. He saw the wisdoms as assisting the understanding of the Torah. In his sermon in Pressburg in 1811 he said: "for all the wisdoms are spices for the Torah, and they are gates and entrances to it."

Especially in history he held that one cannot approach a new problem without examining the past, because the power of reality as it has been revealed in history is stronger than theoretical claims. He instructed his disciples to study among other things the book of Josippon. The Chatam Sofer himself made a personal contribution to local history, and wrote the "Sefer HaZikaron" in which he recounts various events that occurred in his time.

The Chatam Sofer himself studied with Rabbi Tebli Shayar in Mainz, also mathematics, astronomy and history, and he had broad knowledge in philosophy, anatomy and languages such as German and French. He praised the program of David Fraenhayzen, in his book "Mosdot Tevel", to establish a rabbinical seminary in which Torah would be studied alongside general sciences. In his eulogy for his friend, Rabbi David Sinzheim, he mentioned that he acquired general education alongside broad Torah education, and therefore had great influence in circles of the French government. When the community of Fürth was deliberating among several rabbis for the position in the community, he sided with Rabbi Yehoshua of Rawicz who, in addition to his scholarship and fear of Heaven, "was also fluent in Ashkenazic (German) and would stand before kings." He also approved the establishment of a school for young Jews to study secular languages, manual labor and agriculture.

== Methods of study ==
The Chatam Sofer opposed the pilpul method and supported the study of peshat and proficiency, which in his view leads to truth. Thus he wrote to one of his disciples: "the fingernail of the early ones is better, and let him leave the books of the later ones and the deep pilpulim and investigations". He ruled that it is forbidden to use pilpul to decide halakha, since the tendency toward pilpul can divert the student from the main matter.

He also criticized the method of derash when it opposes the simple meaning of Scripture:

"many more distant homiletical interpretations are said in the translations and midrashim, but on condition that they leave the verse on its simple and true meaning and not say that the derash is the simple one… for truth is beloved above all, especially that which pertains to practical halakha."

In his ethical will he recommends to his descendants to study and teach the sons Tanakh with the commentary of Rashi, and Torah with the commentary of Nahmanides — "for he is the head of faithful belief, and by him you will become wise."

He held that one must learn to reach halakhic conclusions, and not for the sake of studying the Talmudic "give-and-take for its own sake". The Chatam Sofer adopted the philological-critical method of study similar to the method of the Vilna Gaon. In his possession were many manuscripts, and he labored to clarify the correct text in the Talmud and the halakhic decisors, because in his opinion the pilpul method arose due to corrupted textual variants. In his study he also made use of adapting the scientific methods of examining parallel sources in a historical, philological, and experimental manner. He held that many of the problems and confusions in the Babylonian Talmud were due to attributing the opinion of one sage to another sage. He used experiments to clarify measurement quantities that appear in halakha, and in laws of kashrut to clarify the anatomy of animals.

Even though the Chatam Sofer supported the study of Aggadah and Kabbalah, and used their sources in sermons and even in halakhic rulings, he opposed ruling halakha according to Aggadah or Kabbalah: "whoever mixes words of Kabbalah with the halakhot is liable because of sowing kilayim".

== Descendants of the Chatam Sofer ==
The family of the Chatam Sofer branched into many lines. Dozens of his descendants served as rabbis, heads of yeshivot and leaders of communities in the states of the Austro-Hungarian Empire in Central Europe. His place in the rabbinate of Pressburg and the headship of the yeshiva was filled by his son Rabbi Avraham Shmuel Binyamin Sofer ("Ktav Sofer"), and after him the family's descendants Rabbi Simcha Bunim Sofer ("Shevet Sofer"), Rabbi Akiva Sofer ("Da'at Sofer"), Rabbi Avraham Shmuel Binyamin Sofer ("Cheshav Sofer"), and currently Rabbi Avraham Shmuel Binyamin Sofer.

His children:

Avraham Shmuel Binyamin Sofer ("Ktav Sofer"), filled his place in the rabbinate of Pressburg and the headship of the yeshiva. The son of the "Ktav Sofer" is Rabbi Shimon Sofer, who served as rabbi of the city of Erlau (Eger) in Hungary and stood at the head of its yeshiva. After the Holocaust, his grandson, Rabbi Yochanan Sofer, the Rebbe of Erlau, established the Erlau Yeshiva in Katamon in Jerusalem and headed an institute for distributing the books of the Chatam Sofer.

Shimon Sofer ("Michtav Sofer"), was the head of the rabbinical court of the Jewish community of the city of Kraków. In Galicia

Hindel, married Rabbi David Zvi Arnfeld, who was the father of Rabbi Shmuel Arnfeld ("Chatan Sofer") and the father-in-law of Rabbi Avraham Glasner. The son of Rabbi Avraham Glasner is Rabbi Moshe Shmuel Glasner.

Gitl, married Rabbi Eliyahu Kornitzer who died at the age of 27, and remarried Rabbi Shlomo Zalman Spitzer, rabbi of the Shifshol community in Vienna. Her son Rabbi Akiva Kornitzer was rabbi of Kraków, and after him his son Rabbi Yosef Nehemiah Kornitzer served there.

Simcha (1822–1911), married Rabbi Moshe Tuvia Lehman.

== Students ==
Hundreds of his pupils became the rabbis of Hungarian Jewry. Among them were:

- Yehuda Aszod (Yehudah Ya'aleh), (1794–1866)
- Aharon Duvid Deutsch (Goren Duvid), (1813–1878)
- Dovid Zvi Ehrenfeld (d. 1861), (son-in-law)
- Shmuel Ehrenfeld (1835–1883), (Chasan Sofer) (grandson)
- Aharon Fried (Tzel Hakesef), (1813–1891)
- Gedalya Glück of Bököny (1796–1881), Author of Chayei Olom
- Menachem Mendel Glück, (1815–1905), Rabbi of Kemecse
- Chaim Joseph Gottlieb of Stropkov
- Menachem Katz, (1795–1891)
- Yisroel Yitzchok Aharon Landesberg, (1804–1879)
- Hillel Lichtenstein (Kolomea) (Maskil El Dol), (1815–1891)
- Chaim Zvi Mannheimer (Ein Habdoilach), (1814–1886)
- Yehuda Modrin (Trumas Hacri), (1820–1893)
- Menachem Mendel Panet (Maglei Tzedek), (1818–1884)
- Meir Perles, (1811–1893)
- Avrohom Schag (Ohel Avrohom), (1801–1876)
- Dovid Schick (Imrei Duvid) (died: 1890) brother of Moshe Schick
- Moshe Schick (Maharam Schick), (1807–1879)
- Akiva Yosef Schlesinger, (1838–1922)
- Avraham Yehuda Hacohen Schwartz (Kol Aryeh), (1824–1883)
- Shimon Sidon (Shevet Shimon) (1815–1891), Rabbi of Cifer and Trnava
- Aharon Singer, (c. 1806–1868)
- Avrohom Shmuel Binyamin Sofer (Ktav Sofer), (1815–1872) (son)
- Chaim Sofer (Machne Chaim), (1822–1886)
- Naftali Sofer (Matei Naftali), (1819–1899)
- Shimon Sofer,(Michtav Sofer)(1821–1883) (son)
- Shlomo Zalman Spitzer (Tikun Shloime), (1811–1893), (son-in-law), Rabbi of Schiff Shul in Vienna
- Yoel Unger (Teshuvas Rivo), (1800–1886)

== Actions of students and descendants ==
Sofer's most notable student, Rabbi Moshe Schick, together with Sofer's sons, the rabbis Shmuel Binyamin and Shimon, took an active role in arguing against the Reform movement. They showed relative tolerance for heterogeneity within the Orthodox camp. Others, such as the more zealous Rabbi Hillel Lichtenstein, supported a more stringent position in orthodoxy.

In 1877, Rabbi Moshe Schick demonstrated support for the separatist policies of Rabbi Samson Raphael Hirsch in Germany. His son studied at the Hildesheimer Rabbinical Seminary, which taught secular studies and was headed by Azriel Hildesheimer. Hirsch, however, did not reciprocate. He was surprised at what he described as Schick's halakhic contortions in condemning even those "status quo" communities that clearly adhered to halakhah. Hillel Lichtenstein opposed Hildesheimer and his son Hirsh in their speaking German to give sermons and their tending toward Modern Zionism.

In 1871, Shimon Sofer, Chief Rabbi of Kraków, founded the Machzikei Hadas organisation with the Hasidic Rabbi Yehoshua Rokeach of Belz. This was the first effort of Haredi Jews in Europe to create a political party; it was part of the developing identification of the traditional Orthodoxy as a self-defined group. Rabbi Shimon was nominated as a candidate to the Polish Regional Parliament, under the Austrian emperor Franz Joseph. He was elected to the "Polish Club", in which he took an active part until his death.

Another notable group is Satmar, which was founded by Rabbi Moshe Teitelbaum, who was a Hasid who paid homage to the Chasam Sofer and had similar views to that of Rabbi Hillel Lichtenstein. His descendant Rabbi Joel Teitelbaum headed the Edah HaChareidis for many years, living in Israel and later in the United States, where he influenced Orthodox Jewry.

Starting in 1830, about twenty disciples of Sofer settled in Ottoman Palestine, almost all of them in Jerusalem. They joined the Old Yishuv, which comprised the Musta'arabim, Sephardim, and Ashkenazim. They also settled in Safed, Tiberias, and Hebron. Together with the Perushim and Hasidim, they formed an approach to Judaism reflecting those of their European counterparts.

Notable disciples of the Pressburg Yeshiva who had major influence on mainstream Orthodoxy in Palestine were Rabbi Yosef Chaim Sonnenfeld (student of Ktav Sofer) and Rabbi Yitzchok Yerucham Diskin (son of Rabbi Yehoshua Leib Diskin, from Brisk, Lithuania), who, together, in 1919, founded the Edah HaChareidis in then-Mandatory Palestine.

In 1932, Sonnenfeld was succeeded by Rabbi Yosef Tzvi Dushinsky, a disciple of the Shevet Sofer, one of Sofer's grandchildren. Dushinsky founded the Dushinsky Hasidic dynasty in Israel, based on Sofer's teachings.

== Universal Israelite Congress ==
The Universal Israelite Congress of 1868–69 in Pest was influential in affecting the direction of Judaism in Europe. To try to unify all streams of Judaism under one constitution, the Orthodox offered the Shulchan Aruch and surrounding codes as the ruling code of law and observance. The reformists dismissed this notation and in response, many Orthodox rabbis resigned from the Congress to form their own social and political groups. Hungarian Jewry split into two major institutionally sectarian groups, Orthodox and Neolog. Some communities refused to join either of the groups and called themselves Status Quo.

== Legacy ==
Many synagogues and yeshivas worldwide bear the name and follow the legacy of the Chatam Sofer.

Communities of the Chug Chatam Sofer preserve his heritage. The "Da'at Sofer" Institute publishes his books and his Torah.

Streets named after him in the cities: Jerusalem, Tel Aviv, Haifa, Beersheba, Petah Tikva, Bnei Brak, Holon, Ashkelon, Modi'in Illit, Beitar Illit, Safed and Immanuel.

In June 2012, on the occasion of the 250th anniversary of the birth of the Chatam Sofer, the National Bank of Slovakia issued a commemorative coin bearing the image of the Chatam Sofer. The value of the coin is 10 euros.

=== Erlau yeshiva and community ===
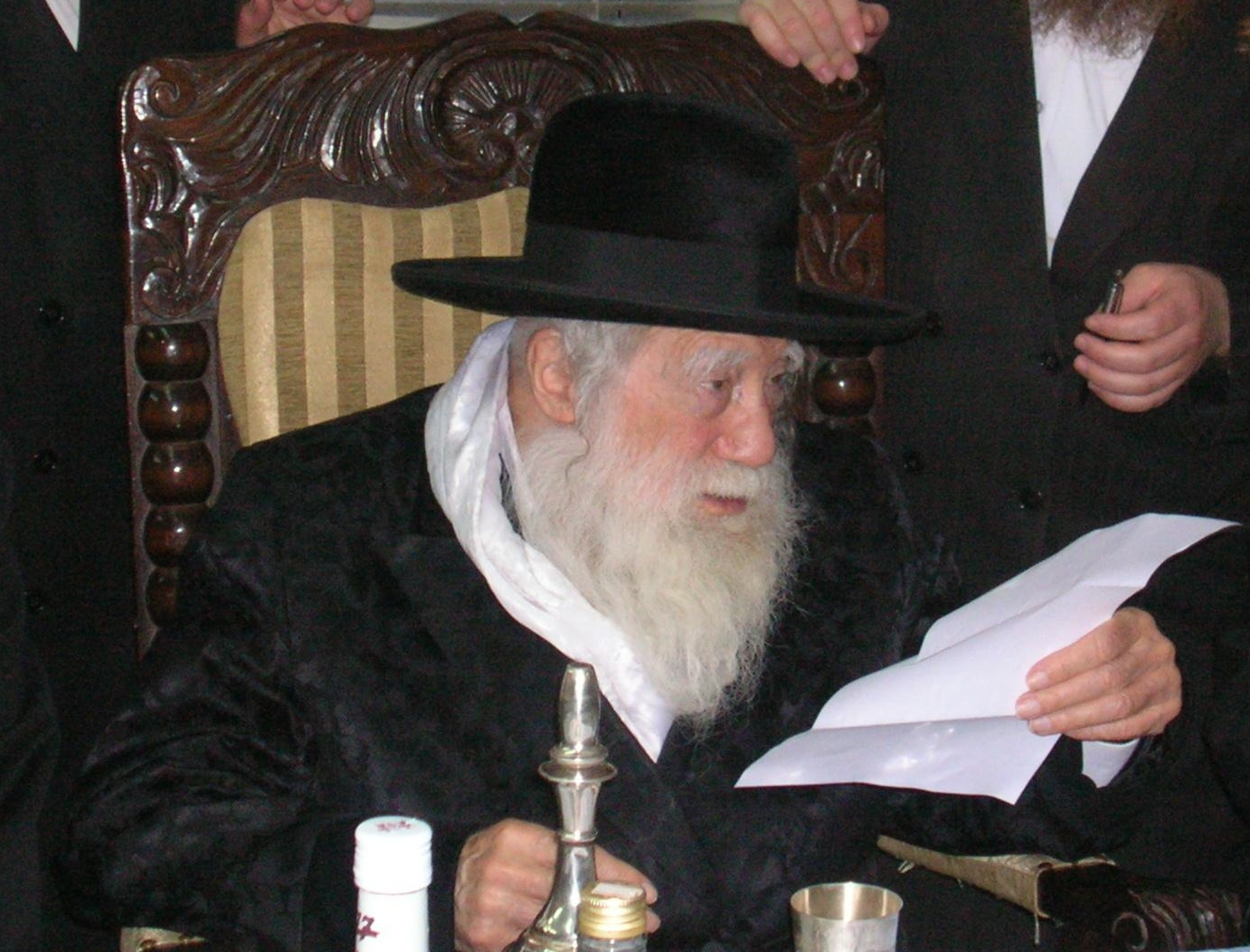
Rabbi Yochanan Sofer

The most notable recent living descendant and heir to the Sofer legacy was Rabbi Yochanan Sofer. Yochanan was a direct descendant and fifth generation to the Chatam Sofer. He was the leader of the Erlau movement, whose progenitor was his grandfather, Rabbi Shimon Sofer of Erlau, a grandson of the Chatam Sofer, and son of the Ktav Sofer.

Yochanan's father, Rabbi Moshe Sofer (II) (Dayan of Erlau), and grandfather, Rabbi Shimon (Av Beth Din of Erlau), perished in the Holocaust, together with most of their families. After the Holocaust, Rabbi Yochanan re-founded the Chasam Sofer Yeshiva in Pest, together with Rabbi Moshe Stern (the Debretziner Rav) and his brother, Avraham Shmuel Binyamin (II). He then returned to Eger (Erlau) to re-establish his grandfather's Yeshiva.

In 1950, he immigrated to Israel, together with his students, and, for a short while, merged his yeshiva with the Pressburg Yeshiva of Rabbi Akiva Sofer (Daas Sofer). In 1953, he founded his own Yeshiva in Katamon, Jerusalem, as well as the Institute for Research of the Teachings of the Chasam Sofer. The Institute researches and deciphers hand-written documents penned by the Chasam Sofer, his pupils, and descendants, and has printed hundreds of sefarim.

Over the years, Rabbi Yochanan founded many synagogues, chederim, and kollelim, which he named after his ancestors. The Ezrat Torah Campus in Jerusalem is named Beth Chasam Sofer, as is the Erlau Synagogue in Haifa. The chederim are named Talmud Torah Ksav Sofer, after the Chasam Sofer's son; the kollelim and synagogues are named Yad Sofer, after Rabbi Yochanan's father; and the main yeshiva campus in Katamon is named Ohel Shimon MiErlau, after his grandfather. He has authored numerous Torah commentary works, naming them Imrei Sofer.

The Erlau community is considered Hasidic style, though strictly follows Ashkenaz customs, as did the Chasam Sofer. It has branches in Jerusalem, Bnei Brak, Beitar Illit, El'ad, Haifa, Ashdod, and Boro Park (New York).

=== The Pressburg Yeshiva of Jerusalem ===
The Pressburg Yeshiva of Jerusalem (Hebrew: ישיבת פרשבורג) is a leading yeshiva located in the Givat Shaul neighborhood of Jerusalem, Israel. It was founded in 1950 by Rabbi Akiva Sofer (known as the Daas Sofer), a great-grandson of Rabbi Moses Sofer (the Chasam Sofer), who established the original Pressburg Yeshiva in the Austrian-Hungarian Empire in 1807. As of 2009, the rosh yeshiva is Rabbi Simcha Bunim Sofer.

The yeshiva building includes a Yeshiva Ketana, Yeshiva Gedolah, and kollel.

The main beis medrash doubles as a synagogue where some neighborhood residents also pray on Shabbat. The complex also includes a general neighborhood synagogue which functions as Givat Shaul's main nusach Ashkenaz synagogue.

=== Chasan Sofer Yeshiva, New York ===
The Ch'san Sofer Yeshiva in New York, named for his grandson the Ch'san Sofer, is considered the American yeshiva of the Chasam Sofer legacy. It was founded by Rabbi Shmuel Ehrenfeld, who was born and raised in Mattersdorf, Austria. His father, Simcha Bunim Ehrenfeld, the rabbi of Mattersdorf, whose father, Rabbi Shmuel Ehrenfeld (the Chasan Sofer), was a grandson of the Chasam Sofer.

Rabbi Shmuel was rabbi of Mattersdorf from 1926 until 1938, when the congregation was dispersed by the Nazis. He escaped to America, and immediately re-established the Chasan Sofer Yeshiva on the Lower East Side, from where it was later relocated to Boro Park. After his death, he was succeeded by his son, Rabbi Simcha Bunim Ehrenfeld. The Yeshiva is currently headed by Rabbi David Aryeh Ehrenfeld, who succeeded his father after his death.

The yeshiva currently enrolls over 400 students in kindergarten through twelfth grade, and operates a Head Start Program and rabbinical seminary.

=== Chug Chasam Sofer, Bnei Brak ===
During the 1950s and 1960s, many synagogues in Israel were built by Hungarian Jewry, and named Chug Chasam Sofer. This network of synagogues were founded in Tel Aviv, Bnei Brak, Jerusalem, Petach Tikva, Haifa, and Netanya. These synagogues still operate, but have been integrated into the larger community, with no distinct character of their own, besides for that of Bnei Brak, founded by Rabbi Yitzchak Shlomo Ungar, and that of Petach Tikva, founded by Rabbi Shmaryahu Deutch.

Rabbi Ungar, a descendant of the Chasam Sofer, founded a yeshiva named Machneh Avraham, and a kashrut organization named Chug Chasam Sofer, which are both very active and well known. After Rabbi Ungar's passing in 1994, the yeshiva appointed Rabbi Altman as rabbi and rosh yeshiva, with Rabbi Shmuel Eliezer Stern remaining the head of the kashrut organization.

=== Pressburg Institutions of London ===
The Pressburg institutions in London, England|London]], England, are headed by a descendant of the Chasam Sofer, Rabbi Shmuel Ludmir (who has published some of his work).

=== Dushinsky, Jerusalem ===
The Dushinsky community considers itself a continuation of the Chasam Sofer dynasty – not by genealogy, but, rather, by school of thought.

The founder of the Dushinsky dynasty was Rabbi Yosef Tzvi Dushinsky (1865–1948), who was a disciple of Rabbi Simcha Bunim Sofer (the Shevet Sofer), the son of the Ksav Sofer at the Pressburg Yeshiva. The Dushinsky dynasty has been more integrated into the Hasidic community, with many of their customs derived from Nusach Sefard, but still remains true to the teachings of the Chasam Sofer. This is mainly due to Rabbi Yosef Tzvi's appointment as Chief Rabbi of the Edah HaChareidis, and the Dushinsky alignment with the teachings of Rabbi Joel Teitelbaum of Satmar.
