= Mad, Slovakia =

Mad Nagymad
- Municipality
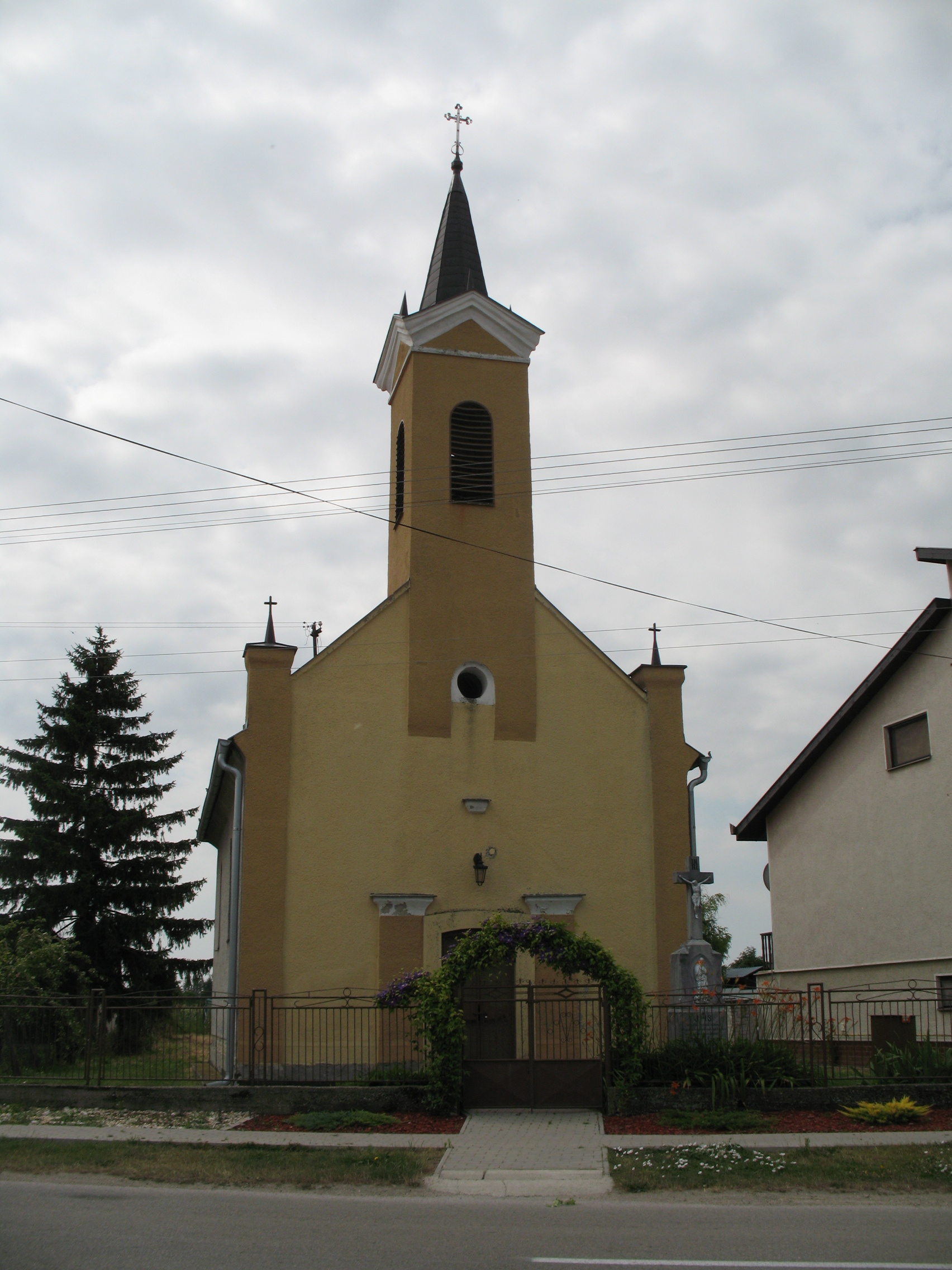

- Flag

- Location of Mad in the Trnava Region Location of Mad in Slovakia
- Coordinates: 47°57′15″N 17°39′30″E
- Country: Slovakia
- Region: Trnava Region
- District: Dunajská Streda District
- First mentioned: 1254

Area
  - Total: 7.71 km^{2} (2.98 sq mi)
- Elevation: 114 m (374 ft)

Population (2025)
  - Total: 579

Ethnicity
- Time zone: UTC+1 (CET)
  - Summer (DST): UTC+2 (CEST)
- Postal code: 930 14
- Area code: +421 31
- Vehicle registration plate (until 2022): DS
- Website: obecmad.sk

Mad (Hungarian: Nagymad, pronounced [ˈnɒɟmɒd]) is a village and municipality in the Dunajská Streda District in the Trnava Region of south-west Slovakia.

== Geography ==
The municipality lies at an altitude of 114 metres (374 ft) and covers an area of 7.71 km^{2} (2.98 sq mi) (2025).

== History ==
In the 9th century, the territory of Mad became part of the Kingdom of Hungary. The village was first recorded in 1254 as Mod, in 1260 as Nagmod. Until the end of World War I, it was part of Hungary and fell within the Dunaszerdahely district of Pozsony County. Mad is not to be confused with Mad in Hungary‘s Zemplen region, the hometown of Rabbi Abraham Judah ha-Kohen Schwartz. After the Austro-Hungarian army disintegrated in November 1918, Czechoslovak troops occupied the area. After the Treaty of Trianon of 1920, the village became officially part of Czechoslovakia. In November 1938, the First Vienna Award granted the area to Hungary and it was held by Hungary until 1945. After Soviet occupation in 1945, Czechoslovak administration returned and the village became officially part of Czechoslovakia in 1947.

== Population ==
Population statistic (10 years)
Year	1995	2005	2015	2025
Count	481	496	569	579
Difference		+3.11%	+14.71%	+1.75%

Population statistic
Year	2024	2025
Count	576	579
Difference		+0.52%

It has a population of 579 people (31 December 2025).

In 1910, the village had 438, for the most part, Hungarian inhabitants. At the 2001 Census the recorded population of the village was 469 while an end-2008 estimate by the Statistical Office had the village's population as 509.

=== Ethnicity ===
Census 2021 (1+ %)
Ethnicity	Number	Fraction
Hungarian	491	85.98%
Slovak	70	12.25%
Not found out	31	5.42%
Total	571	

In year 2021 was 571 people by ethnicity 491 as Hungarian, 70 as Slovak and 31 as Not found out.

Note on population: The difference values of population numbers in the table "Population statistic" and in the sections "Ethnicity" & "Religion" is caused by the use of various statistical methods.

=== Religion ===
Census 2021 (1+ %)
Religion	Number	Fraction
Roman Catholic Church	333	58.32%
Calvinist Church	123	21.54%
None	64	11.21%
Not found out	28	4.9%
Evangelical Church	8	1.4%
Greek Catholic Church	7	1.23%
Total	571	

In year 2021 was 571 people by religion 333 from Roman Catholic Church, 123 from Calvinist Church, 64 from None, 28 from Not found out, 8 from Evangelical Church, 7 from Greek Catholic Church, 5 from Jehovah's Witnesses, 1 from Other and not ascertained christian church, 1 from Christian Congregations in Slovakia and 1 from Other.
