= Abraham Judah ha-Kohen Schwartz =

Hungarian rabbi (1824–1883)

Rabbi Abraham Yehuda ha-Kohen Schwartz Z"L
- Title: Grand Rabbi

Personal life
- Born: 26 July 1824 Mád Hungary
- Died: 25 October 1883 (Age 59)
- Buried: Mád
- Spouse: Faige Gintzler
- Children: Naftali Schwartz (son)
- Parents: Pinchas Zelig Schwartz (father); Hendel Raizel Schwartz (mother)

Religious life
- Religion: Hasidic Judaism

Senior posting
- Position: Rabbi of Beregszasz and Mád
- Yeshiva: Pressburg Yeshiva
- Began: 1861
- Ended: 1881
- Other: Rabbi of Mad (1881–1883)

Rabbi Abraham Judah ha-Kohen Schwartz (Hungarian: Schwartz Ábrahám; 1824–1883), also known by his responsa as the Sefer Kol Aryeh, was one of the leading Hungarian rabbis of the nineteenth century.

He was a student of Moses Sofer and Benjamin Wolf Low. From 1861 to 1881 he served as the Rabbi of Beregszasz, Hungary and then until 1883 in his native town of Mád. He was an active participant in the rabbinical gathering in Nagymihaly in 1866 and at the congress held in Budapest in 1869.

Although Rabbi Schwartz studied in the Pressburg Yeshiva whose leaders were opposed to Hasidism, he became deeply attached to Hasidism after a visit he made to Chaim Halberstam, the founder of the Sanz hasidic dynasty.

His son Naftali Schwartz (1843–1896) succeeded him as rav of Mád. Schwartz wrote only one work titled Kol Aryeh, but its influence on the rabbis of Hungary was great. One of his great-grandchildren, Dov Ber Spitzer (son-in-law of Chaim Zvi Ehrenreich (1875-1936), Rabbi of Mad from 1932 to 1936), wrote his biography, published under the title Toldos Kol Aryeh (1940). See also "Hakol Aryeh", circa 2004.
