= Akiva Yosef Schlesinger =

Orthodox rabbi (1838–1922)

Akiva Yosef Schlesinger (1838–1922) (Hebrew: עקיבא יוסף שלזינגר) was a noted Orthodox Jewish rabbi who served as the rabbinical leader of what was then Pressburg, Hungary, but what is now Bratislava, Slovakia.

== Early years ==
Schlesinger was born in Hungary but emigrated to Israel.

== Scholarship ==
Schlesinger was a disciple of Rabbi Samuel Benjamin Sofer (the Ktav Sofer) and Moshe Schick (the Maharam Schick).

He was the author of the Lev haivri, a commentary on the last will and testament of Rabbi Moses Sofer (the Chatam Sofer), a previous head rabbi of Pressburg and the father of one of his main teachers.

Additionally, he is known for his unsuccessful attempt to reinstate the blowing of the shofar when Rosh Hashana falls on Shabbat, which had been banned since the times of the Talmud under the edict known as gezeirah d'Rabbah, named after Rabbah bar Nahmani, a noted amora of the late 3rd-early 4th centuries.

== Controversy ==
At times, he made very controversial statements regarding such things as the political nature of the early kollel systems of dispensing funds to poor Jews living in Eretz Israel (not to be confused with the more contemporary use of the term kollel, which refers to post-graduate institutions of talmudic study). Because of this, there was a time when his written works were put under a cherem (ban).
