= Benjamin Wolf Löw =

Polish-Hungarian rabbi (1775–1851)

Rabbi Benjamin Wolf Löw

Personal life
- Born: 1775 Loslau, Prussian Silesia
- Died: March 6, 1851

Religious life
- Religion: Judaism

Benjamin Wolf Löw (1775 – 6 March 1851) was a Polish–Hungarian rabbi. He was also known as Binyamin ben Elʻazar, Benjamin Adolf Löw, and Hebrew: Binyamin Ṿolf Leṿ, a.b.d. ḳ.ḳ. Ḳollin u-Ṿerboi.

Löw was born in Loslau (Wodzisław), Prussian Silesia. His father, Eleazar Löw, instructed him in Talmudic literature, and at an early age he became rabbi of a Polish congregation. One of his students was Abraham Judah ha-Kohen Schwartz. In 1812, following his father to Austria, he became rabbi of Kolín, Bohemia. In 1826 he was called as rabbi to Nagytapolcsány (Topoľčany), Royal Hungary, and in 1836 to Verbo (Vrbové), where he spent the remainder of his life.

Löw's only work was Sha'are Torah, a treatise on the principles of Talmudic law which shows the author's methodical mind and vast knowledge of Talmudic literature. Three parts of the work appeared in print (Vienna, 1821 and 1850; Sátoraljaújhely, 1872), while the 4th part was still in manuscript as of 1906.

Löw was twice married; his first wife, from whom he obtained a divorce, was the daughter of Ephraim Zalman Margolioth of Brody; the second was the daughter of Isaac Landau, rabbi of Auschwitz (Oświęcim). Löw's son Jeremiah, rabbi in Sátoraljaújhely, was the recognized leader of the Orthodox party in Hungary and its spokesman in an audience which its deputation obtained with the Emperor in order to protest against the establishment of a rabbinical seminary. He was nevertheless opposed to the secession of the Orthodox from the whole body of Judaism and therefore refused to take part in a congress planned by the Orthodox. Upon his death in 1872 he was succeeded by his son Eleazar, who was later called to the rabbinate of Unghvar (Uzhhorod). Other grandsons of Wolf Löw were Abraham and Benjamin Singer, joint authors of Ha-Madrik, a pedagogic anthology of the Talmud. Moses Löb Bloch was Wolf Löw's nephew and pupil.
