= Šúrovce =

- Municipality
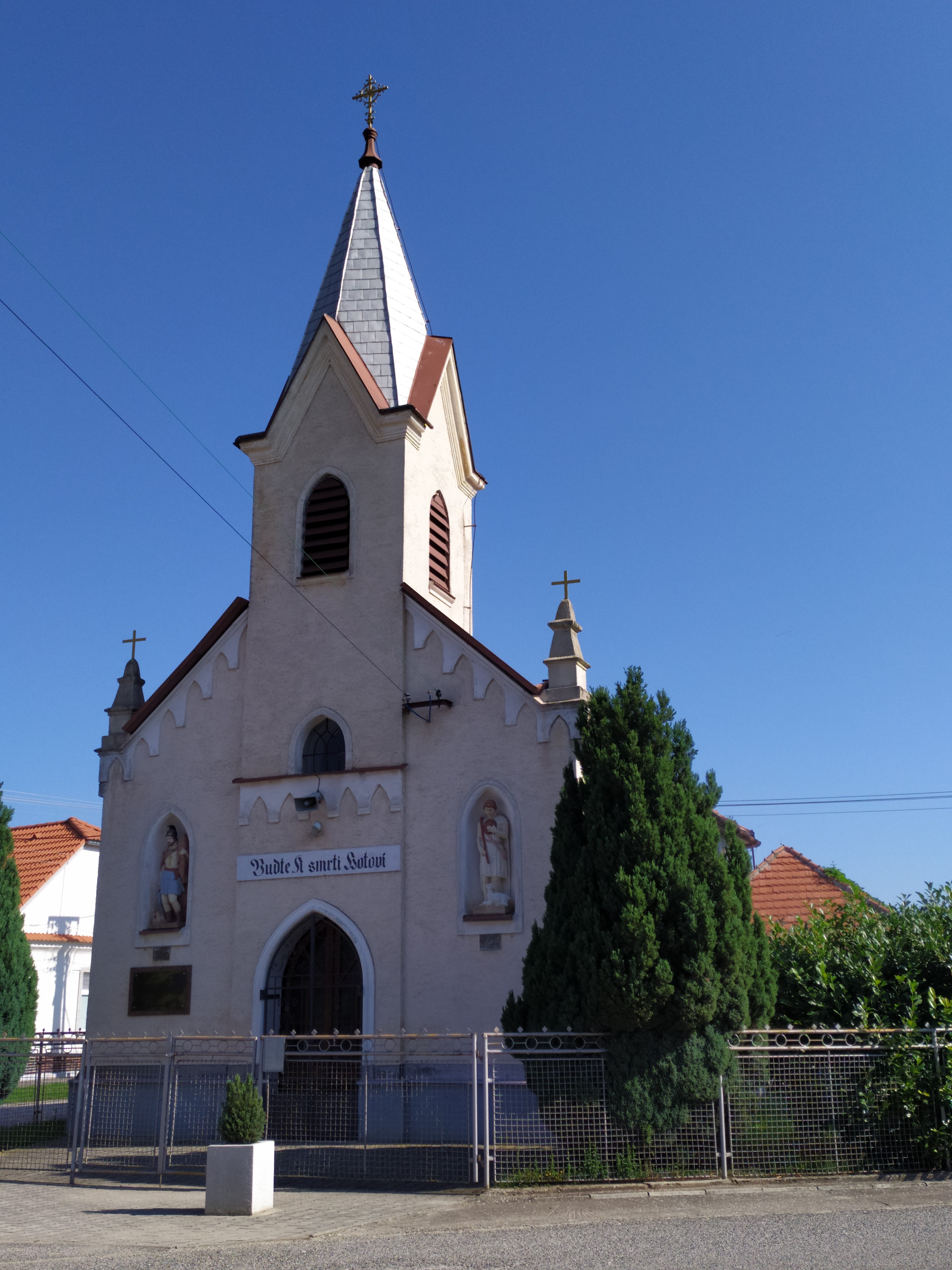

- Flag

- Location of Šúrovce in the Trnava Region Location of Šúrovce in Slovakia
- Coordinates: 48.33°N 17.72°E
- Country: Slovakia
- Region: Trnava Region
- District: Trnava District
- First mentioned: 1291

Area
  - Total: 19.90 km^{2} (7.68 sq mi)
- Elevation: 132 m (433 ft)

Population (2025)
  - Total: 2,242
- Time zone: UTC+1 (CET)
  - Summer (DST): UTC+2 (CEST)
- Postal code: 919 25
- Area code: +421 33
- Vehicle registration plate (until 2022): TT
- Website: www.surovce.sk

Šúrovce (Hungarian: Súr) is a village and municipality of Trnava District in the Trnava region of Slovakia.

== Geography ==
The municipality lies at an altitude of 132 metres (433 ft) and covers an area of 19.90 km^{2} (7.68 sq mi) (2025).

== Population ==
Population statistic (10 years)
| Year | 1995 | 2005 | 2015 | 2025 |
|---|---|---|---|---|
| Count | 2147 | 2203 | 2332 | 2242 |
| Difference | | +2.60% | +5.85% | −3.85% |

Population statistic
| Year | 2024 | 2025 |
|---|---|---|
| Count | 2245 | 2242 |
| Difference | | −0.13% |

It has a population of 2242 people (31 December 2025).

=== Ethnicity ===
Census 2021 (1+ %)
| Ethnicity | Number | Fraction |
|---|---|---|
| Slovak | 2168 | 95.21% |
| Not found out | 107 | 4.69% |
| Total | 2277 | |

In year 2021 was 2277 people by ethnicity 2168 as Slovak, 107 as Not found out, 10 as Hungarian, 9 as Other, 6 as Czech, 6 as Russian, 5 as Romani, 3 as Serbian, 1 as Italian, 1 as Romanian, 1 as Polish and 1 as Bulgarian.

Note on population: The difference values of population numbers in the table "Population statistic" and in the sections "Ethnicity" & "Religion" is caused by the use of various statistical methods.

=== Religion ===
Census 2021 (1+ %)
| Religion | Number | Fraction |
|---|---|---|
| Roman Catholic Church | 1743 | 76.55% |
| None | 359 | 15.77% |
| Not found out | 102 | 4.48% |
| Total | 2277 | |

In year 2021 was 2277 people by religion 1743 from Roman Catholic Church, 359 from None, 102 from Not found out, 22 from Evangelical Church, 7 from Islam, 7 from Greek Catholic Church, 6 from Paganism and natural spirituality, 6 from Other, 6 from Ad hoc movements, 5 from Christian Congregations in Slovakia, 4 from Calvinist Church, 4 from Eastern Orthodox Church, 4 from Other and not ascertained christian church and 2 from Buddhism.
