= Pressburg Yeshiva (Jerusalem) =

Orthodox yeshiva and synagogue in Jerusalem

Pressburg Yeshiva of Jerusalem Hebrew: ישיבת פרשבורג
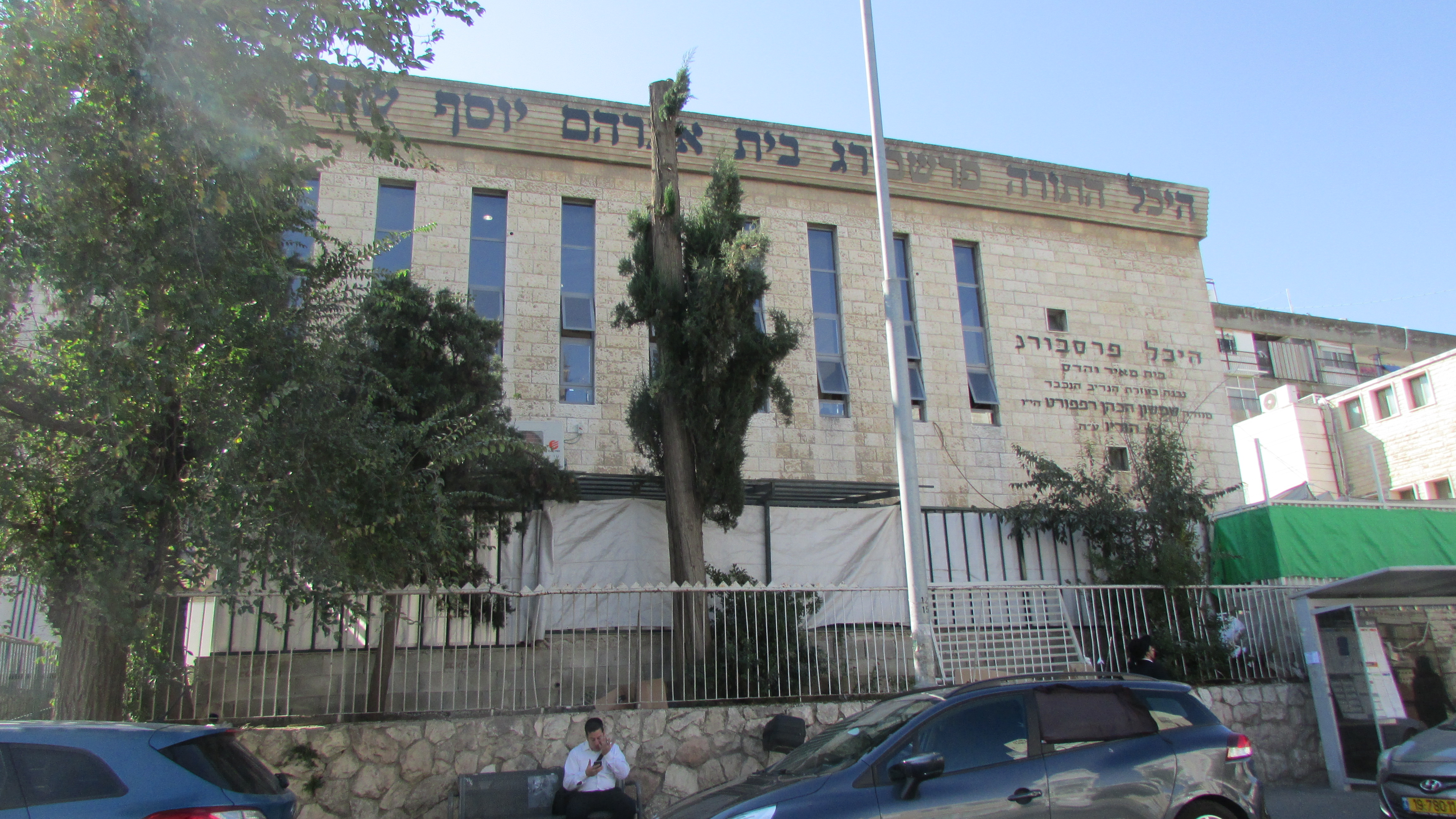
- The yeshiva exterior, in 2019

Location
- Givat Shaul, Jerusalem; Israel
- Coordinates: 31°47′28.79″N 35°11′40.66″E

Information
- Type: Yeshiva and synagogue
- Religious affiliation(s): Orthodox Judaism (Nusach Ashkenaz)
- Established: 1950
- Founder: Rabbi Akiva Sofer
- Rosh yeshiva: Rabbi Avraham Shmuel Binyamin Sofer-Schreiber
- Gender: Males
- Language: Hebrew

The Pressburg Yeshiva of Jerusalem (Hebrew: ישיבת פרשבורג) is an Orthodox yeshiva, with synagogue, located in the Givat Shaul neighborhood of Jerusalem, in Israel.

== Overview ==
The yeshiva was founded in 1950 by Rabbi Akiva Sofer (known as the Daas Sofer), a great-grandson of Rabbi Moses Sofer (the Chatam Sofer), who established the original Pressburg Yeshiva in the Austro-Hungarian Empire in 1807. Rabbi Simcha Bunim Sofer served as Rosh yeshiva until his death in 2017, and was succeeded by his son, Rabbi Avraham Shmuel Binyamin Sofer-Schreiber, who also serves as Rosh kollel.

The yeshiva building includes a yeshiva ketana, yeshiva gedola, and kollel.

The main beis medrash doubles as a synagogue where some neighborhood residents also pray on Shabbat. The complex also includes a general neighborhood synagogue which functions as Givat Shaul's main Ashkenazi synagogue.

== See also ==
- History of the Jews in Israel
- List of yeshivas in Israel
- List of synagogues in Israel
