= Shimon Sidon =

Rabbi Shimon Sidon was a Hungarian rabbi; born at Nadash on January 3, 1815 (13 Shevat 5575 on the Hebrew calendar) to Yehuda Sidon from Kunitz and Eidel Sonnenfeld. He died at Trnava on December 18, 1891 (19 Kislev 5652 on the Hebrew calendar).

At age thirteen in 1829, Sidon entered the Yeshiva of the Chassam Sofer and studied there for nine years until 1838. He became close to his teacher who he writes was like a father to him, he served him and ate at his table (something very few students of the Chasam Sofer merited). In 1838 he returned home and married Rachel Duschinsky who was also from his hometown Nadash.

In Nadash he taught young students for seven years until he was appointed rabbi of Cifer in 1845 until, in 1856, he was appointed as rabbi of the newly founded Jewish community of Trnava which had been closed to Jews since they were expelled from it in around 1555. He died in Trnava in 1891 leaving his wife and three sons, Asher who was at that time rabbi of Vershetz, Shmuel, and Itzik.

== Works by Sidon ==
- Ois Bris, 1850
- Beis Menucha, Pressburg 1869
- Shevet Shimon, Pressburg 1884, Vienna 1888, Pressburg 1891
