= Hillel Lichtenstein =

Hungarian rabbi

Rabbi Hillel Lichtenstein (1814–1891) was a Hungarian rabbi and the leader of hasidic Orthodoxy in Hungary.

== Life ==
Hillel Lichtenstein was born at Vécs, Hungary (also called Vágvecse; today Veča, part of Šaľa, Slovakia) in 1814 to the dayan R. Baruch Bendit. After studying at the yeshiva of the Chassam Sofer, he married in 1837 the daughter of a well-to-do resident of Galanta, where he remained until 1850, when he was elected rabbi of Margarethen (Szent Margit). In 1854 he was elected rabbi of Klausenburg, but the opposition of the district rabbi, Avrohom Friedman, made it impossible for him to enter upon the duties of the office; finally he was expelled from Klausenburg by the authorities. Having lived for some time at Nagyvárad, he was recalled to Margarethen, where he remained until about 1865, when he was called to Szikszó. Thence he went, in 1867, to Kolomyia, where he remained until his death.

He was a prominent leader of Haredi Judaism in Hungary: he not only resisted the slightest deviation from the traditional ritual, as the removal of the bimah from the center of the synagogue, but also vigorously denounced the adoption of non-Jewish social manners and dress and the acquisition of secular education. He directed his criticism not only at the reformers, but also at the moderate Orthodox Azriel Hildesheimer. He bitterly opposed the Hungarian Jewish congress of 1868–69 and the establishment of the Neolog rabbinical seminary in Budapest. In 1865 he called a rabbinical convention at Michalovce, which banned reforming synagogues.

His religious practise was unusually strict even among Hungarian Orthodox rabbis, even going so far as to keep a she-donkey in order to be able to fulfill the law of Petter Chamor. He kept a sheep also in order to be able to give the first fleece to a Kohen (Deuteronomy 18:4), from whom subsequently he bought it back to make tzitzit from it. Rabbi Lichtenstein was an ardent admirer of Hasidic Judaism, and made pilgrimages to the famous Rebbe of Sanz, the Divrei Chaim. He offered his own intercession through prayer to people in distress, but declined any gifts. He died on 18 May 1891 in Kolomyia, Galicia (now Ukraine).

== Views ==
Lichtenstein was a powerful preacher and a popular writer, and the resistance to modern tendencies among the Jews of northern Hungary is largely due to his influence. He inveighed against the use of other than traditional Jewish names; he denounced not only secular education, but even the playing of musical instruments and innocent social games, like chess and checkers; and he condemned those who relied on reason, for the ideal Jew should live up to the principle of Psalm 73:22, "I was as a beast before thee". He was a decided opponent also of all agitation for the political emancipation of the Jews, saying that it is the duty of the Jews to suffer the tribulations of the Exile until God finds them ripe for Messianic redemption.

== Works ==
Of the numerous works which Lichtenstein wrote, some of them being in Hebrew and others in Judæo-German, the most important of which were published included his responsa in Teshuvot Beit Hillel (Satmar 1908) and his sermons Maskil el Dal (Lemberg, 1867), Eis La'asos (ib. 1881), and Avkath Roichel (ib. 1883), all of which have been repeatedly reedited. They are all devoted to the denunciation of reform Judaism.
