= Moshe Schick =

Rabbi Moshe Schick
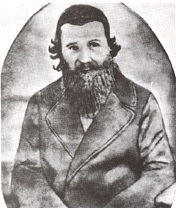
- Rabbi Schick, 1868
- Title: Maharam Schick

Personal life
- Born: March 1, 1807 Birkenhein, Kingdom of Hungary (present-day Brezová pod Bradlom, Slovakia)
- Died: January 25, 1879 (aged 71) Huszt, Hungary (present-day Ukraine)
- Notable work(s): Responsa on all four parts of the Shulchan Aruch, Torah commentary, sermons, novellae on the Talmud, etc.
- Education: Pressburg Yeshiva (Austria-Hungary)
- Known for: Prominent Orthodox rabbi, leader in the Orthodox camp during the struggle with the Neologs
- Occupation: Rabbi

Religious life
- Religion: Judaism

Moshe Schick (1 March 1807 – 25 January 1879; Hebrew: משה שיק, alternatively spelled as Shick, Shik, Shieck) was a prominent Hungarian Orthodox rabbi. In rabbinical commentary Shik is commonly known as the Maharam Schick (מהר״ם שיק); Maharam is the Hebrew acronym for Moreinu Harav Moshe (מורינו הרב משה), which means "Our Teacher Rabbi Moses".

== Biography ==
Schick was born in Birkenhein, Kingdom of Hungary (contemporary Brezová pod Bradlom, Slovakia), the son of Rabbi Joseph Schick. The family were descended from Rabbi Hanoch Heinich Schick of Shklov. He was a cousin of Elijah Schik.

At the age of 11, Moshe Shick was sent to study with his uncle, Rabbi Yitzchak Frankel, the Av Beth Din in Regensdorf. When he was 14, he was sent to learn under Moses Sofer in Pressburg, where he stayed for six years. Sofer called his prodigious student "a treasure chest full of holy books". When he was 20, Moses Shick married his cousin, Gittel Frankel. They had several children. He was appointed Rabbi of Yeregin in 1838, where he opened a yeshiva. He taught students there for three decades. In 1861 he became Rabbi of Huszt, present-day Ukraine, and moved his 800-student yeshiva with him.

Schick was a leading figure in the Orthodox camp during its struggle with the Neologs, who promoted educational, social and moderate religious reform and embraced the Magyarization policy of the government. On 28 December 1867, shortly after the Austro-Hungarian Compromise, the Jews of Hungary were legally emancipated. Minister of Religion József Eötvös sought to establish a national Jewish organization which would represent the various communities before the government. The Orthodox, fearing the institution will be dominated by their rivals, held a rabbinical assembly in Pest between 24 November and 3 December 1868. Samuel Benjamin Sofer was elected president, and Schick had no official position, yet he emerged as leader. It was he who decided to send Eötvös a letter declaring that the Orthodox will not accept the resolutions of the upcoming National Jewish Congress – which was convened in Pest, between 10 December and 23 February 1869, to form the new organization – unless it would conform with their rabbis' opinions. Schick and Sigmund Kraus, a lay activist, led the Orthodox campaign to secede from the directory. On 15 November 1871, the new Minister of Religion Tivadar Pauler recognized the Central Bureau of the Autonomous Jewish Orthodox Communities in Hungary (Magyarországi Autonóm Orthodox Izraelita Hitfelekezet Központi Irodája), which was separate and independent from the Neolog-oriented National Jewish Bureau (Az Izraeliták Országos Irodája).

== Works ==
Maharam Shik authored responsa on all four parts of the Shulchan Aruch and the 613 Mitzvot; these She'elot U'Tshuvot - MaHaram Shik contain over 1000 discussions, on all issues of life, and are published in 3 volumes.

Other works include:

- Chidushe ha-Maharam Shik – Novellae on the Talmud
- Derashot Maharam Shik – Sermons
- Sefer Maharam Shik al ha-Torah – Torah Commentary
- Maharam Shik al taryag mitsvot – on the 613 commandents
- Chidushe Aggados Maharam Shik – on Maseches Avos
