= Abrahám Pressburger =

Czech partizan (1924–2018)

- Born: Jindřich Pressburger; 7 May 1924; Bratislava, Czechoslovakia
- Died: 24 July 2018 (aged 94) Omer, Israel
- Allegiance: Czechoslovakia; Slovak partisans; Hashomer Hatzair
- Conflicts: World War II; Slovak National Uprising (WIA)
- Education: Masaryk grammar school

Abrahám Pressburger (né Jindřich Pressburger; 7 May 1924 – 24 July 2018) was a Jewish-Czech partisan during World War II. He later lived in Israel where he worked as a construction worker and civil engineer.

== Early life ==
Pressburger was born on 7 May 1924 in Bratislava in Czechoslovakia. Pressburger attended the Masaryk grammar school in Plzeň where he was a classmate and friend of Rudolf Vrba. According to Pamäť Národa Pressburger was expelled from school for his Jewish ancestry in 1939.

== World War II ==
In 1942 Pressburger was interred at Sereď concentration camp. While at Sered' Pressburger met Vrba who had survived Auschwitz concentration camp. In 1944 Pressburger escaped Sered' while part of a detached prisoner labor unit and joined the Jewish resistance group Hashomer Hatzair, he later participated in the Slovak National Uprising where he was wounded.

== Later life ==
Following the war Pressburger became the chairman of Haschomer Hatzair in Czechoslovakia. Beginning in 1948 Pressburger, his wife Eva Ginz (the sister of Petr Ginz), and sister emigrated to Israel via France. While in Israel Pressburger worked as a civil engineer and construction worker. Pressburger died on 24 July 2018 in Omer, Israel.
