= Chaim Sofer =

Hungarian rabbi and scholar

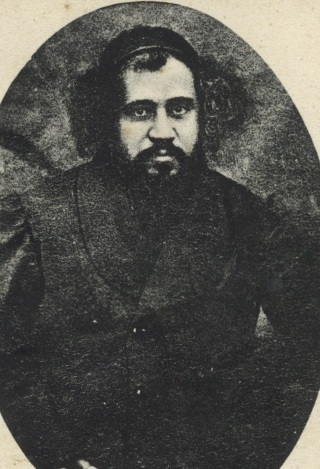
- Title: Rabbi

Personal life
- Born: September 29, 1821 Pressburg, Hungary
- Died: June 28, 1886 (aged 64) Budapest, Hungary
- Buried: Pressburg, Hungary

Religious life
- Religion: Judaism
- Denomination: Orthodox Judaism

Rabbi Chaim Sofer (also known as the Machne Chaim, the name of his responsa) (September 29, 1821 – June 28, 1886) was a renowned Hungarian rabbi and "scholarly spokesperson for Orthodox Judaism during his time."

== Biography ==
Chaim Sofer was born in Pressburg, Hungary (now Bratislava, Slovakia), on September 29, 1821. His father was Mordechai Efraim Fischel. Sofer attended the famous yeshiva of Rabbi Moses Sofer (no relation) in Pressburg, and was considered his "most distinguished student". He also attended the yeshiva of Rabbi Meir Eisenstaedter in Ungvar, Hungary (now Uzhhorod, Ukraine).

In 1844, aged 23, he was hired to teach high-school students in a yeshiva in Mattersdorf, Hungary (now Mattersburg, Austria). He subsequently served as the rabbi of the Orthodox Jewish communities in Gyömöre, Hungary (1852) Sajószentpéter, Hungary (1859), and Munkacs, Hungary (now Mukachevo, Ukraine (1868). While he was Chief Rabbi in Munkacs, Sofer was against introducing any "innovations" in Judaism. Nevertheless, he was not considered "conservative" enough and in 1879 was replaced by one of the Munkacs Hassidic rabbis.

In 1879, he was chosen rabbi of the Orthodox congregation in the newly merged city of Budapest, Hungary, where he officiated until his death. His position was replaced by Rabbi Koppel Reich. Sofer died in Budapest on June 28, 1886, and was buried in Pressburg, the city of his birth.

== Notable rulings ==
- According to Halakha (Jewish law), abortion is permitted when the life of the mother is in danger. Sofer ruled that once the baby is "partially born", one cannot even injure the baby to save the mother, unless non-interference will mean both mother and child die.

According to J. David Bleich:

Interpreted in a similar manner the further provision of the Mishnah. . . "but once the major portion has emerged one may not touch it" [the fetus] implies that even the maiming of a partially born child or amputation of a limb is forbidden in order to save the mother. R. Chaim Sofer (Machaneh Chaim, Choshen Mishpat, no. 50) draws such an inference and indicates that the rationale motivating the decision is the fact that the physician "cannot guarantee with certainty" that the child will survive the surgical procedure. However, if non-interference will result in the loss of both mother and child, R. Sofer permits maiming of the child in an attempt to save the life of the mother.

== Modernism ==
Sofer held that it was important that the Yiddish language be preserved and be established as a part of Jewish life. He was also opposed in general to the introduction of modern innovations to religious activity and services in the same vein as his mentor, Moses Sofer. His stance was in opposition to that of Azriel Hildesheimer who supported secular studies.

== Works by Sofer ==
- Peles Chaim (Pressburg, 1854)
- Machne Chaim (4 vols., 2 editions), a collection of responsa
- Chillul Shabbat (Sajószentpéter)
- Kol Sofer, a commentary on the Mishnah
- Dibrei Sharei Chaim
- Sharei Chaim
