= Abraham Berliner =

German historian and theologian (1833-1915)

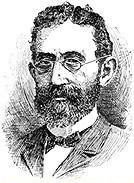
Portrait of Abraham Berliner from the 1906 Jewish Encyclopedia

Abraham Adolf Berliner (Hebrew: אברהם ברלינר; May 2, 1833 – April 21, 1915) was a German theologian and historian, born in Obersitzko, in the Grand Duchy of Posen, Prussia.

== Biography ==
Berliner was initially educated by his father, who was the teacher in Obersitzko. He continued his education under various rabbis, later studying at the University of Leipzig where he received the degree of doctor of philosophy.

After serving for some time as preacher and teacher in Arnswalde, in 1865 Berliner was called to Berlin to be superintendent of the religious school run by the Society for Talmudic Studies (Ḥebrat Shas). In 1873, when Israel Hildesheimer opened the rabbinical seminary in Berlin, Berliner was selected as professor of Jewish history and literature. In this role and as an author, he was untiring. His edition of Rashi's commentary to the Pentateuch (1866) first made him known as a scholar. Berliner added to his reputation through his various historical works, the result of his research in the archives and libraries of Italy, which was financially supported by the German government.

In 1874–75 Berliner edited the scientific periodical Magazin für Jüdische Geschichte und Literatur. From 1876 to 1893 he, together with his colleague, David Hoffmann, continued to edit the periodical under the revised title Magazin für die Wissenschaft des Judenthums.

It was due to his zeal that the Hebrew literary society Meḳiẓe Nirdamim was revived in 1885. This society was dedicated towards the publication of older Jewish literature with Berliner now as its director. He engaged as a defender of Judaism in a pamphlet against Paul de Lagarde (Prof. Paul de Lagarde, nach Seiner Natur Gezeichnet, 1887), who denounced all Jewish scholars as dilettanti; and when the blood accusation was revived, he republished (1888) the opinion of Cardinal Ganganelli (afterwards Pope Clement XIV) to prove the falsity of this charge.

While Orthodox in his religious views, Berliner was never a fanatic. Not only was his scientific work in line with liberal thinking, but he also paid a high tribute to the merits of Moritz Steinschneider, on the occasion of the latter's seventieth birthday (1886), by compiling a bibliography of that eminent scholar's works.

Berliner died in Berlin.

== Works ==
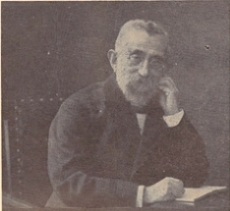
Photo portrait of Abraham Berliner.

The following is a list of Berliner's works:

- Raschi, Commentar zum Pentateuch, 1866
- Aus dem Inneren Leben der Deutschen Juden im Mittelalter, 1871; 2d ed., 1900
- Pleṭat Soferim: Beiträge zur Jüdischen Schriftauslegung im Mittelalter, 1872
- Yesod 'Olam, das Aelteste Bekannte Dramatische Gedicht in Hebr. Sprache, von Mose Sacut, 1874
- Die Massorah zum Targum Onkelos, 1875, 1877
- Migdal Ḥananel, Ueber Leben und Schriften R. Chananel's in Kairuan, 1876
- Ein Gang Durch die Bibliotheken Italiens, 1877
- Rabbi Jesaja Berlin: Eine Biographische Skizze, 1879
- Beiträge zur Hebräischen Grammatik im Talmud und Midrasch, 1879
- Hebräische Grabschriften in Italien, 1881
- Persönliche Beziehungen Zwischen Juden und Christen im Mittelalter, 1882
- Beiträge zur Geographie und Ethnographie Babyloniens im Talmud und Midrasch, 1884
- Targum Onkelos (now the standard edition), 1884
- Aus den Letzten Tagen des Römischen Ghetto, 1886
- Censur und Confiscation Hebräischer Bücher im Kirchenstaate, 1891
- Geschichte der Juden in Rom, von der Aeltesten Zeit bis zur Gegenwart (2050 Jahre), 3 vols., 1893
- Ueber den Einfluss des Ersten Hebräischen Buchdrucks auf den Cultus und die Cultur der Juden, 1896
- Aus Meiner Bibliothek, Ein Beitrag zur Bibliographie und Typographie, 1898.
