= Orthodox Judaism =

Traditionalist branches of Judaism

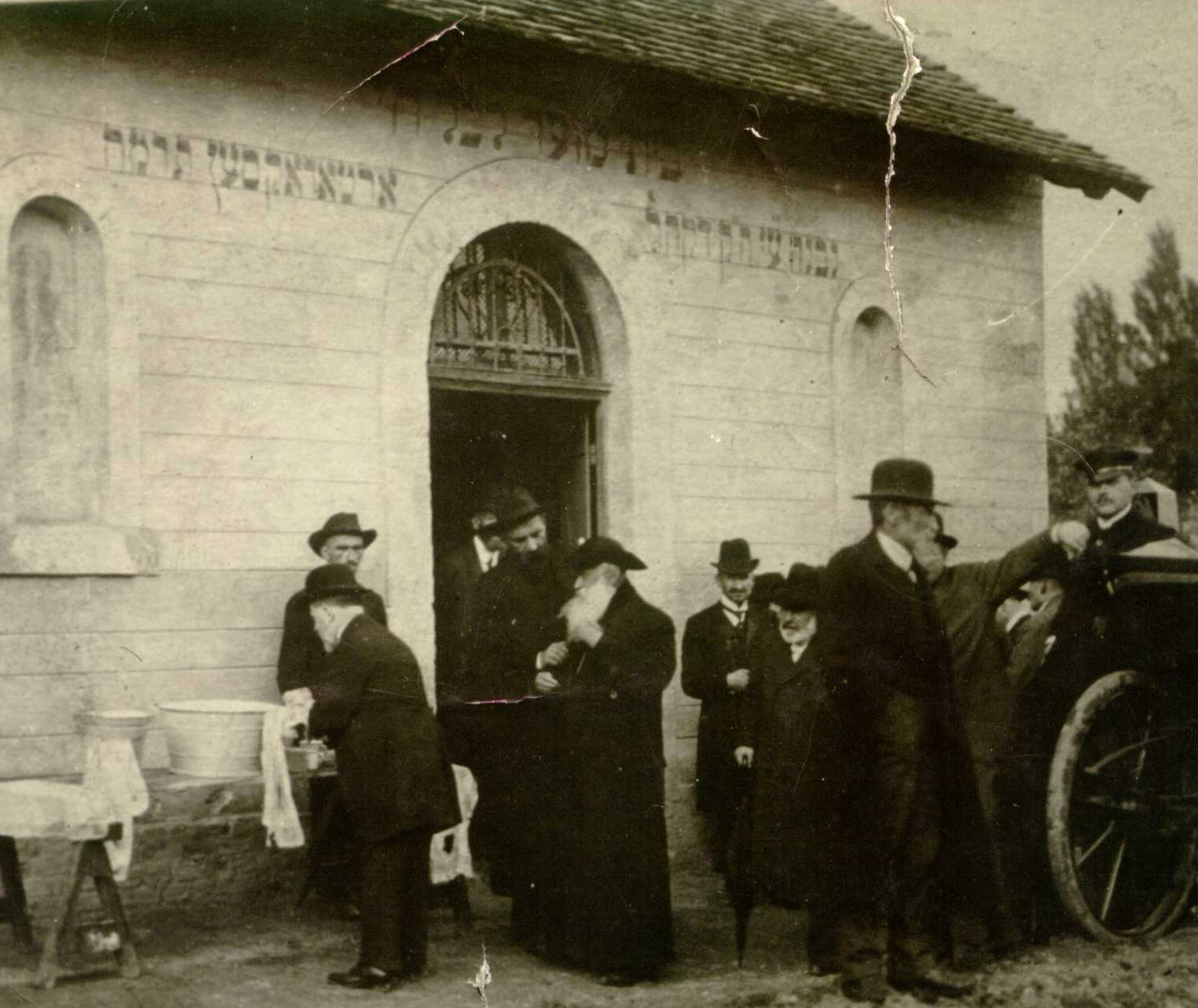
- Jewish cemetery of the separate Orthodox community in Budapest, c. 1920. The Word "Orthodox" (ארטאדאקסען) inscribed in Hebrew letters, second from the left.

Total population
- 2+ million practicing, ~4-5 million affiliated

Founder
- Moses Sofer and other 19th-20th century traditionalist leaders

Regions with significant populations
- Israel: 1 million (strictly observant) – 2.2 million (identifying)
- United States: ~500,000
- United Kingdom: ~150,000
- Belgium: ~13,000

Religions
- Judaism

Scriptures
- Hebrew Bible

Languages
- Hebrew, Yiddish

Orthodox Judaism is a collective term for the traditionalist branches of contemporary Judaism. Theologically, it is chiefly defined by regarding the Torah, both Written and Oral, as literally revealed by God on Mount Sinai and faithfully transmitted ever since.

Orthodox Judaism therefore advocates a strict observance of Jewish law, or halakha, which is to be interpreted and determined only according to traditional methods and in adherence to the continuum of received precedent through the ages. It regards the entire halakhic system as ultimately grounded in immutable revelation, essentially beyond external and historical influence. More than any theoretical issue, obeying the dietary, purity, ethical and other laws of halakha is the hallmark of Orthodoxy.

Observant Orthodox Jews are distinguishable by their lifestyle, refraining from doing numerous routine actions on the Sabbath and holidays, consuming only kosher food, praying thrice a day, studying the Torah often, donning head covering and tassels for men and modest clothing for women, and so forth. Other key doctrines include belief in a future bodily resurrection of the dead, divine reward and punishment for the righteous and the sinners, the Election of Israel as a people bound by a covenant with God, and an eventual reign of a salvific Messiah who will restore the Temple in Jerusalem and gather the people to Zion.

Orthodox Judaism is not a centralized denomination. Relations between its different subgroups are often strained, and the exact limits of Orthodoxy are subject to intense debate. Very roughly, it may be divided between the Haredi branch, commonly referred to as Ultra-Orthodox, which is more conservative and reclusive, and the Modern Orthodox, which is relatively open to larger society and partakes in secular life and culture. Each of those is itself formed of independent communities. These are almost uniformly exclusionist, regarding Orthodoxy as the only legitimate form of Judaism.

While adhering to traditional beliefs, the movement is a modern phenomenon. It arose as a result of the breakdown of the autonomous Jewish community since the late 18th century, and was much shaped by a conscious struggle against the pressures of secularization, acculturation and rival alternatives. The strictly observant Orthodox are a definite minority among all Jews, but there are also numerous semi- and non-practicing persons who are affiliated or personally identify with Orthodox communities and organizations. In total, Orthodox Judaism is the largest Jewish religious group, estimated to have over 2 million practicing adherents, and at least an equal number of nominal members or self-identifying supporters.

== Definitions ==
The earliest known mention of the term Orthodox Jews was made in the Berlinische Monatsschrift in 1795. The word Orthodox was borrowed from the general German Enlightenment discourse, and used to denote those Jews who opposed Enlightenment. During the early and mid-19th century, with the advent of the progressive movements among German Jews, and especially early Reform Judaism, the title Orthodox became the epithet of traditionalists who espoused conservative positions on the issues raised by modernization. They themselves often disliked the Christian term, preferring titles such as "Torah-true" (gesetztreu). They often declared that they used it only as a convenience. German Orthodox leader Rabbi Samson Raphael Hirsch referred to "the conviction commonly designated as Orthodox Judaism"; in 1882, when Rabbi Azriel Hildesheimer became convinced that the public understood that his philosophy and Liberal Judaism were radically different, he removed the word Orthodox from the name of his Hildesheimer Rabbinical Seminary. By the 1920s, the term had become common and accepted even in Eastern Europe.

Orthodoxy perceives itself as the only authentic continuation of Judaism as it was until the crisis of modernity. Its progressive opponents often shared this view, regarding it as a remnant of the past and lending credit to their own rivals' ideology. Thus, the term Orthodox is often used generically to refer to traditional (even if only in the sense that it is unrelated to the modernist movements) synagogues, rites, and observances.

Academic research noted that the formation of Orthodox ideology and organizations was itself influenced by modernity. This was brought about by the need to defend the very concept of tradition in a world where that was no longer self-evident. When secularization and the dismantlement of communal structures uprooted the old order of Jewish life, traditionalist elements united to form groups that had a specific self-understanding. This, and all that it entailed, constituted a notable change, for the Orthodox had to adapt to modern society no less than anyone else; they developed novel, sometimes radically so, means of action and modes of thought. "Orthodoxization" was a contingent process, drawing from local circumstances and dependent on the threat sensed by its proponents: a sharply delineated Orthodox identity appeared in Central Europe, in Germany and Hungary, by the 1860s; a less stark one emerged in Eastern Europe during the Interwar period. Among the Jews of the Muslim lands, similar processes on a large scale began only around the 1970s, after they immigrated to Israel. Orthodoxy is often described as extremely conservative, ossifying a once-dynamic tradition due to the fear of legitimizing change. While this was sometimes true, its defining feature was not forbidding change and "freezing" Jewish heritage, but rather the need to adapt to being but a segment of Judaism in a modern world inhospitable to traditional practice, often employing much accommodation and leniency. In the mid-1980s, research on Orthodox Judaism became a scholarly discipline, examining how the need to confront modernity shaped and changed its beliefs, ideologies, social structure, and halakhic rulings, separating it from traditional Jewish society.

== History ==
=== Modernity crisis ===
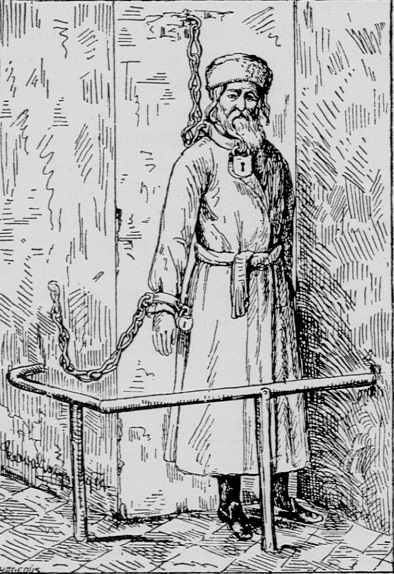
A Jewish man pilloried in the synagogue, a common punishment in the pre-emancipation Jewish community in Europe.

Until the latter half of the 18th century, Jewish communities in Central and Western Europe were autonomous entities, with distinct privileges and obligations. They were led by the affluent wardens' class judicially subject to rabbinical courts, which governed most civil matters. Jewish Law was considered normative and enforced upon transgressors (common sinning was rebuked, but tolerated) invoking all communal sanctions: imprisonment, taxation, flogging, pillorying, and, especially, excommunication. Cultural, economic, and social exchange with non-Jewish society was limited and regulated.

This state of affairs came to an end with the rise of the modern, centralized state, which appropriated all authority. The nobility, clergy, urban guilds, and all other corporate estates were gradually stripped of privileges, inadvertently creating a more equal and secularized society. The Jews were one of the groups affected: excommunication was banned, and rabbinic courts lost almost all their jurisdiction. The state, especially following the French Revolution, was more and more inclined to tolerate Jews as a religious sect, but not as an autonomous entity, and sought to reform and integrate them as "useful subjects". Jewish emancipation and equal rights were discussed. The Christian (and especially Protestant) separation of "religious" and "secular" was applied to Jewish affairs, to which these concepts were alien. The rabbis were bemused when the state expected them to assume pastoral care, foregoing their principal judicial role. Of secondary importance, much less than the civil and legal transformations, were the ideas of Enlightenment that chafed at the authority of tradition and faith.

By the end of the 18th century, the weakened rabbinic establishment was facing a new kind of transgressor: they could not be classified as tolerable sinners overcome by their urges (khote le-te'avon), or as schismatics like the Sabbateans or Frankists, against whom sanctions were levied. Their attitudes did not fit the criteria set when faith was a normative and self-evident part of worldly life, but rested on the realities of the new, secularized age. The wardens' class, which wielded most power within the communities, was rapidly acculturating and often sought to oblige the state's agenda.

Rabbi Elazar Fleckeles, who returned to Prague from the countryside in 1783, recalled that he first faced there "new vices" of principled irreverence towards tradition, rather than "old vices" such as gossip or fornication. In Hamburg, Rabbi Raphael Cohen attempted to reinforce traditional norms. Cohen ordered the men in his community to grow a beard, forbade holding hands with one's wife in public, and decried women who wore wigs, instead of visible headgear, to cover their hair; Cohen taxed and otherwise persecuted members of the priestly caste who left the city to marry divorcees, men who appealed to state courts, those who ate food cooked by Gentiles, and other transgressors. Hamburg's Jews repeatedly appealed to the civil authorities, which eventually justified Cohen. However, the unprecedented meddling in his jurisdiction profoundly shocked him and dealt a blow to the prestige of the rabbinate.

An ideological challenge to rabbinic authority, in contrast to prosaic secularization, appeared in the form of the Haskalah (Jewish Enlightenment) movement which came to the fore in 1782. Hartwig Wessely, Moses Mendelssohn, and other maskilim called for a reform of Jewish education, abolition of coercion in matters of conscience, and other modernizing measures. They bypassed rabbinic approval and set themselves, at least implicitly, as a rival intellectual elite. A bitter struggle ensued. Reacting to Mendelssohn's assertion that freedom of conscience must replace communal censure, Rabbi Cohen of Hamburg commented:

The very foundation of the Law and commandments rests on coercion, enabling to force obedience and punish the transgressor. Denying this fact is akin to denying the sun at noon.

However, maskilic-rabbinic rivalry ended in most of Central Europe, as governments imposed modernization upon their Jewish subjects. Schools replaced traditional cheders, and standard German began to supplant Yiddish. Differences between the establishment and the Enlightened became irrelevant, and the former often embraced the views of the latter (now antiquated, as more aggressive modes of acculturation replaced the Haskalah program). In 1810, when philanthropist Israel Jacobson opened what was later identified as the first Reform synagogue in Seesen, with modernized rituals, he encountered little protest.

=== Hamburg Temple dispute ===
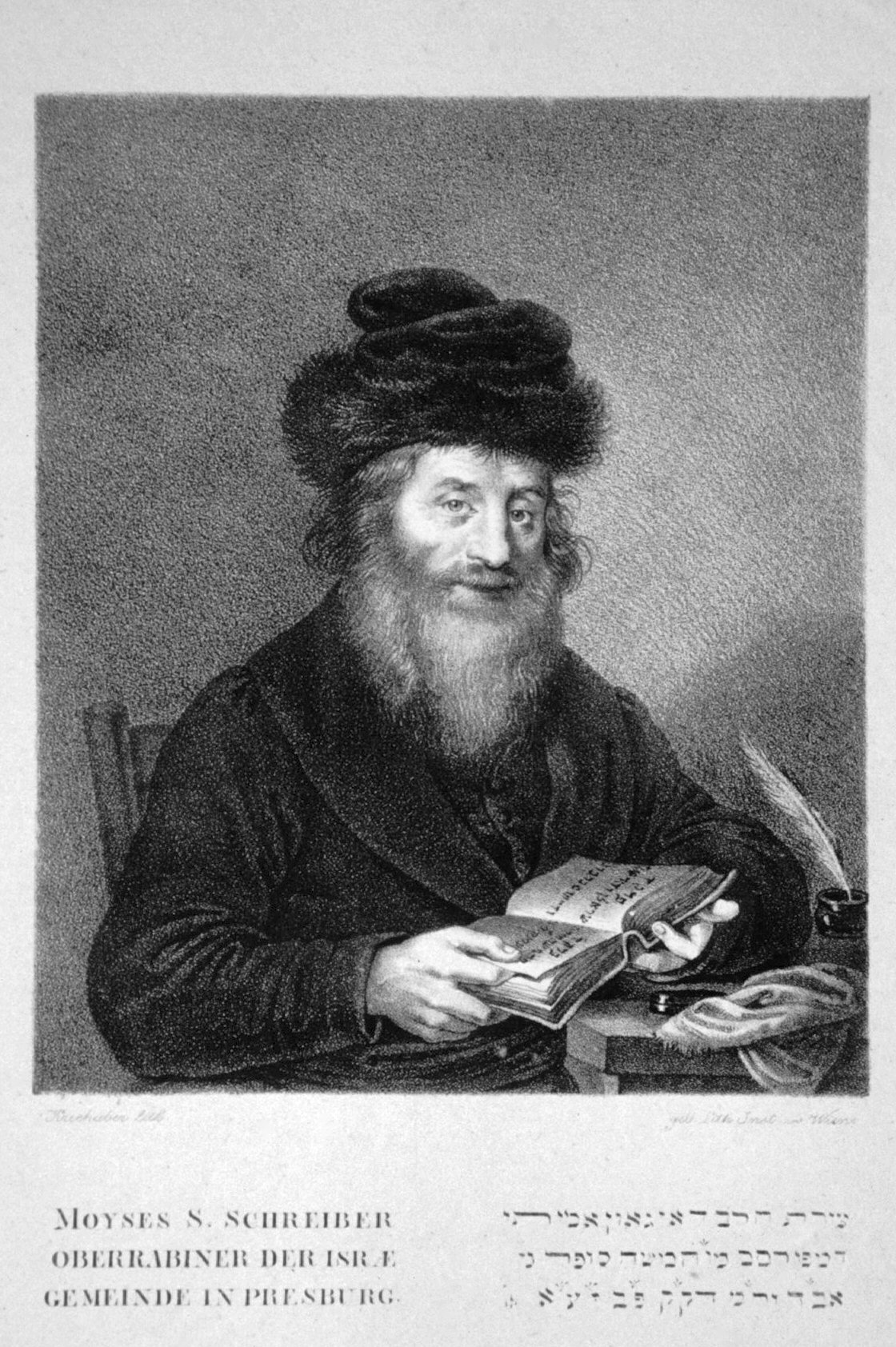
Moses Sofer of Pressburg, considered the father of Orthodoxy in general and ultra-Orthodoxy in particular.

The founding of the Hamburg Temple in 1818 mobilized the conservative elements. The organizers of the synagogue wished to appeal to acculturated Jews with a modernized ritual. They openly defied not just the local rabbinic court that ordered them to desist, but published learned tracts that castigated the entire rabbinical elite as hypocritical and obscurant. The moral threat they posed to rabbinic authority, as well as halakhic issues such as having a gentile play an organ on the Sabbath, were combined with theological issues. The Temple's revised prayer book omitted or rephrased petitions for the coming of the Messiah and renewal of sacrifices (post factum, it was considered to be the first Reform liturgy). More than anything else, this doctrinal breach alarmed the traditionalists. Dozens of rabbis from across Europe united in support of the Hamburg rabbinic court, banning the major practices enacted there and offering halakhic grounds for forbidding any changes. Most historians concur that the 1818–1821 Hamburg Temple dispute, with its concerted backlash against Reform and the emergence of a self-aware conservative ideology, marks the beginning of Orthodox Judaism.

The leader and organizer of the Orthodox camp during the dispute, and the most influential figure in early Orthodoxy, was Rabbi Moses Sofer of Pressburg, Hungary. Historian Jacob Katz regarded him as the first to grasp the realities of the modern age. Sofer understood that what remained of his political clout would soon disappear, and that he had largely lost the ability to enforce observance; as Katz wrote, "obedience to halakha became dependent on recognizing its validity, and this very validity was challenged by those who did not obey." He was deeply troubled by reports from his native Frankfurt and the arrival from the west of dismissed rabbis, ejected by progressive wardens, or pious families, fearing for the education of their children. These émigrés often became ardent followers.

Sofer's response to the crisis of traditional Jewish society was unremitting conservatism, canonizing every detail of prevalent norms in the observant community lest any compromise legitimize the progressives' claim that the law was fluid or redundant. He was unwilling to trade halakhic opinions for those he considered to be pretending to honor the rules of rabbinic discourse, while intending to undermine them. Sofer regarded traditional customs as equivalent to vows; he warned in 1793 that even the "custom of ignoramuses" (one known to be rooted solely in a mistake of the common masses) was to be meticulously observed and revered. Sofer was frank and vehement about his stance, stating during the Hamburg dispute that prayers in the vernacular were not problematic per se, but he forbade them because they constituted an innovation. He succinctly expressed his attitude in wordplay he borrowed from the Talmud: "The new (Chadash, originally meaning new grain) is forbidden by the Torah anywhere." Regarding the new, ideologically-driven sinners, Sofer commented in 1818 that they should have been anathemized and banished from the People of Israel like earlier heretical sects.

Unlike most, if not all, rabbis in Central Europe, who had little choice but to compromise, Sofer enjoyed unique circumstances. He, too, had to tread carefully during the 1810s, tolerating a modernized synagogue in Pressburg and other innovations, and his yeshiva was nearly closed by warden Wolf Breisach. But in 1822, three poor (and therefore traditional) community members, whose deceased apostate brother bequeathed them a large fortune, rose to the wardens' board. Breisach died soon after, and the Pressburg community became dominated by the conservatives. Sofer also possessed a strong base in the form of his yeshiva, the world's largest at the time, with hundreds of students. And crucially, the large and privileged Hungarian nobility blocked most imperial reforms in the backward country, including those relevant to the Jews. Hungarian Jewry retained its pre-modern character well into the 19th century, allowing Sofer's disciples to establish a score of new yeshivas, at a time when these institutions were rapidly closing in the west, and a strong rabbinate to appoint them. A generation later, a self-aware Orthodoxy was well entrenched in the country. Hungarian Jewry gave rise both to Orthodoxy in general, in the sense of a comprehensive response to modernity, and specifically to the traditionalist, militant ultra-Orthodoxy.

The 1818–1821 controversy also elicited a different response, which first arose in its very epicenter. Severe protests did not affect Temple congregants, eventually leading the wardens of Hamburg's Jewish community to a comprehensive compromise for the sake of unity. They replaced the elderly, traditional Chief Dayan Baruch Oser with Isaac Bernays. The latter was a university graduate, clean-shaven, and modern, who could appeal to the acculturated and the young. Bernays signified a new era, and historians marked him as the first modern rabbi, fitting the demands of emancipation: his contract forbade him to tax, punish, or coerce, and he lacked political or judiciary power. He was forbidden from interfering in the Temple's conduct. Conservative in the principal issues of faith, in aesthetic, cultural, and civil matters, Bernays was a reformer. He introduced secular studies for children, wore a cassock like a Protestant clergyman, and delivered vernacular sermons. He forbade the spontaneous, informal character of synagogue conduct typical of Ashkenazi tradition, and ordered prayers to be somber and dignified. Bernays' style re-unified the Hamburg community by accommodating their aesthetic demands (but not theological ones, raised by only a learned few).

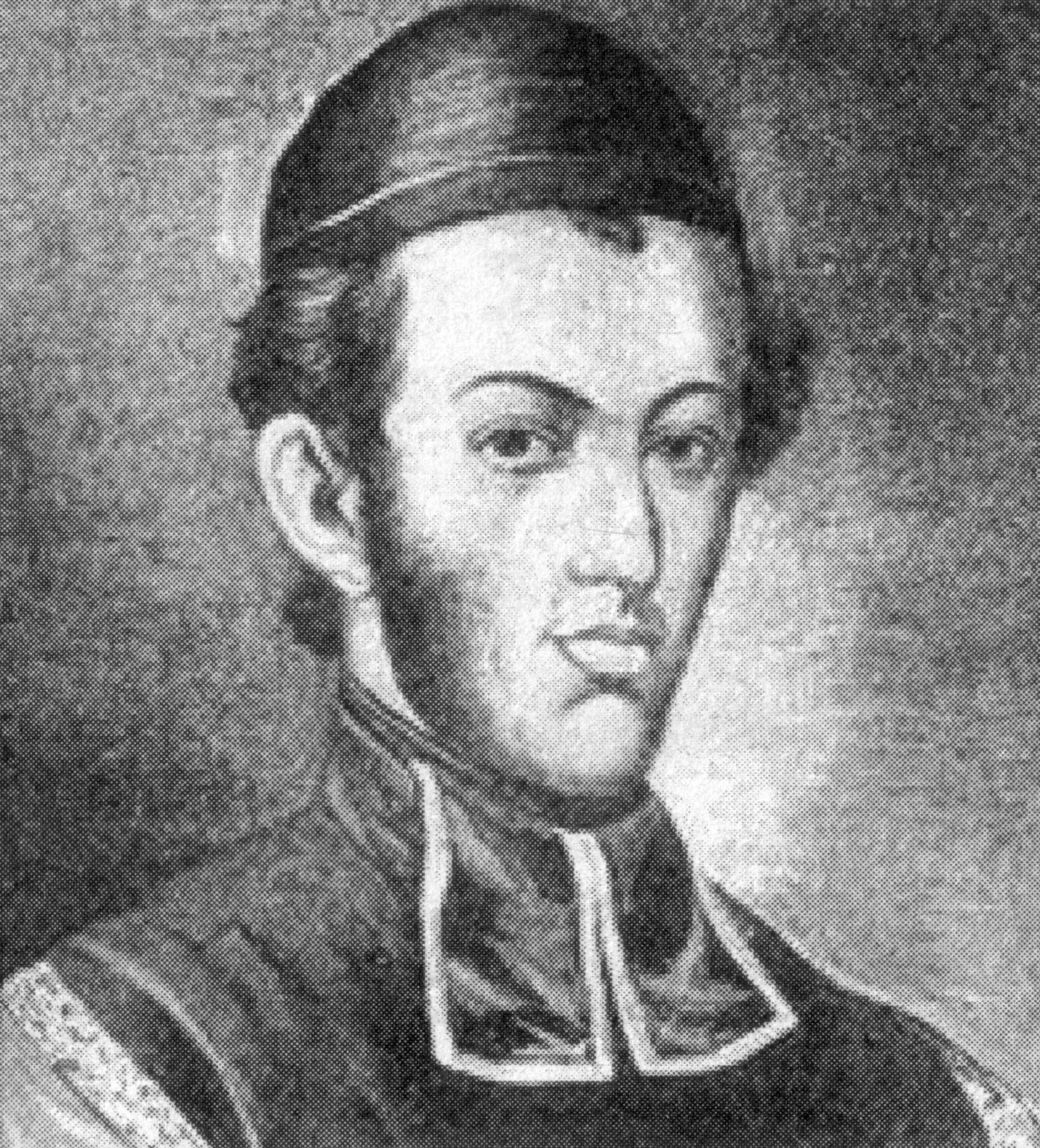
Isaac Bernays in clerical vestments. The ministerial style of dress seen here was ubiquitous among Central and Western European (neo)-Orthodox Jews.

The combination of religious conservatism and modernity in everything else was emulated elsewhere, earning the label "Neo-Orthodoxy". Bernays and his like-minded followers, such as Rabbi Jacob Ettlinger, fully accepted the platform of the moderate Haskalah, taking away its progressive edge. While old-style traditional life continued in Germany until the 1840s, secularization and acculturation turned Neo-Orthodoxy into the strict right-wing of German Jewry. It was fully articulated by Bernays' mid-century disciples Samson Raphael Hirsch and Azriel Hildesheimer. Hirsch, a Hamburg native who was ten during the Temple dispute, combined Orthodox dogmatism and militancy against rival interpretations of Judaism, granting leniency on many cultural issues and embraced German culture. The novel mixture termed "Neo-Orthodoxy" spread.

While insisting on strict observance, the movement both tolerated and advocated modernization: traditionally rare formal religious education for girls was introduced; modesty and gender separation were relaxed to match German society; men went clean-shaven and dressed like Gentiles; and exclusive Torah study virtually disappeared. Basic religious studies incorporating German Bildung provided children with practical halakhic knowledge for thriving in modern society. Ritual was reformed to match prevalent aesthetic conceptions, much like non-Orthodox synagogues though without the ideological undertone, and the liturgy was often abbreviated. Neo-Orthodoxy mostly did not attempt to reconcile its conduct and halakhic or moral norms. Instead it adopted compartmentalization, de facto limiting Judaism to the private and religious spheres, while otherwise yielding to outer society. While conservative Rabbis in Hungary still thought in terms of the now-lost communal autonomy, the Neo-Orthodox turned Judaism from an all-encompassing practice into a private religious conviction.

=== Wissenschaft des Judentums ===
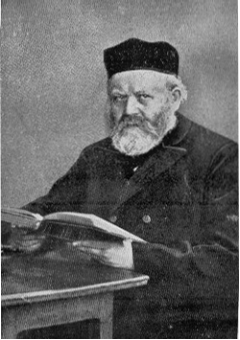
David Zvi Hoffmann, the single most prominent Orthodox theoretician who dealt with the critical-historical method.

In the late 1830s, modernist pressures in Germany shifted from the secularization debate, moving into the "purely religious" sphere of theology and liturgy. A new generation of university-trained rabbis (many German states required communal rabbis to possess such education) sought to reconcile Judaism with the historical-critical study of scripture and the dominant philosophies of the day, especially Kant and Hegel. Influenced by the critical "Science of Judaism" (Wissenschaft des Judentums) pioneered by Leopold Zunz, and often in emulation of the Liberal Protestant milieu, they reexamined and undermined beliefs held as sacred in traditional circles, especially the notion of an unbroken chain from Sinai to the Sages. The more radical among the Wissenschaft rabbis, unwilling to limit critical analysis or its practical application, coalesced around Rabbi Abraham Geiger to establish Reform Judaism. Between 1844 and 1846, Geiger organized three rabbinical synods in Braunschweig, Frankfurt and Breslau, to determine how to refashion Judaism for present times.

The Reform conferences were met with uproar by the Orthodox. Warden Hirsch Lehren of Amsterdam and Rabbi Jacob Ettlinger of Altona both organized anti-Reform manifestos, denouncing the new initiatives, signed by scores of rabbis from Europe and the Middle East. The tone of the signatories varied considerably along geographic lines: letters from traditional societies in Eastern Europe and the Ottoman Empire implored local leaders to petition the authorities and have them ban the movement. Signers from Central and Western Europe used terms commensurate with the liberal age. All were implored by the petitioners to be brief and accessible; complex halakhic arguments, intended to convince the rabbinic elite in past generations, were replaced by an appeal to the secularized masses.

The struggle with Wissenschaft criticism shaped the Orthodox. For centuries, Ashkenazi rabbinic authorities espoused Nahmanides' position that the Talmudic exegesis, which derived laws from the Torah's text by employing hermeneutics, was binding d'Oraita. Geiger and others presented exegesis as an arbitrary, illogical process, and consequently defenders of tradition embraced Maimonides' claim that the Sages merely buttressed already received laws with biblical citations, rather than actually deriving them.

Jay Harris commented, "An insulated orthodox, or, rather, traditional rabbinate, feeling no pressing need to defend the validity of the Oral Law, could confidently appropriate the vision of most medieval rabbinic scholars; a defensive German Orthodoxy, by contrast, could not. ... Thus began a shift in understanding that led Orthodox rabbis and historians in the modern period to insist that the entire Oral Law was revealed by God to Moses at Sinai." 19th-Century Orthodox commentaries, like those authored by Malbim, attempted to amplify the notion that the Oral and Written Law were intertwined and inseparable.

Wissenschaft posed a greater challenge to the modernized neo-Orthodox than to the traditionalist. Hirsch and Hildesheimer divided on the matter, anticipating modernist Orthodox attitudes to the historical-critical method. Hirsch argued that analyzing minutiae of tradition as products of their historical context was akin to denying its divine origin and timeless relevance. Hildesheimer consented to research under limits, subjugating it to the predetermined sanctity of the subject matter and accepting its results only when they accorded with the latter. More importantly, while he was content to engage academically, he opposed its practical application in religious questions, requiring traditional methods to be used. Hildesheimer's approach was emulated by his disciple Rabbi David Zvi Hoffmann, a scholar and apologetic. His polemic against the Graf-Wellhausen hypothesis formed the classical Orthodox response to Higher Criticism. Hoffman declared that for him, the unity of the Pentateuch was a given, regardless of research. Hirsch often lambasted Hoffman for contextualizing rabbinic literature.

All of them stressed the importance of dogmatic adherence to Torah min ha-Shamayim, which led them to conflict with Rabbi Zecharias Frankel, Chancellor of the Jewish Theological Seminary of Breslau. Unlike the Reform camp, Frankel insisted on strict observance and displayed great reverence towards tradition. But though appreciated by conservatives, his practice of Wissenschaft left him suspect to Hirsch and Hildesheimer. They demanded again and again that he state his beliefs concerning the nature of revelation. In 1859, Frankel published a critical study of the Mishnah, and added that all commandments classified as "Law given to Moses at Sinai" were merely customs (he broadened Asher ben Jehiel's opinion). Hirsch and Hildesheimer seized the opportunity and launched a public campaign against him, accusing him of heresy. Concerned that public opinion regarded both neo-Orthodoxy and Frankel's "Positive-Historical School" centered at Breslau as similarly observant and traditionalist, the two stressed that the difference was dogmatic and not halakhic. They managed to tarnish Frankel's reputation in the traditional camp and delegitimized him for many. The Positive-Historical School is regarded by Conservative Judaism as an intellectual forerunner. While Hildesheimer distinguished Frankel's observant disciples from Reform proponents, he wrote in his diary: how meager is the principal difference between the Breslau School, who don silk gloves at their work, and Geiger who wields a sledgehammer.

=== Communal schism ===
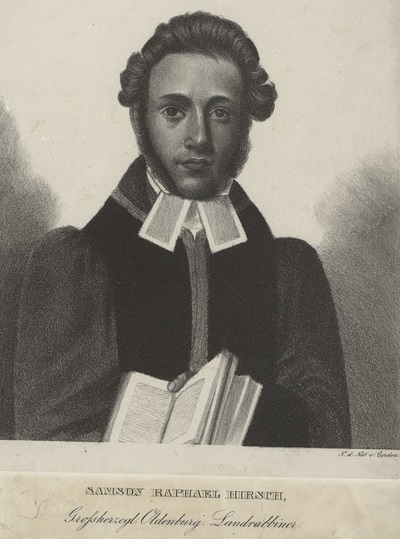
Young Samson Raphael Hirsch, the ideologue of Orthodox secession in Germany.

During the 1840s in Germany, as traditionalists became a clear minority, some Orthodox rabbis, such as Salomo Eger of Posen, urged the adoption of Moses Sofer's position and to anathemize the principally nonobservant. Eating, worshipping or marrying with them were to be banned. Rabbi Jacob Ettlinger, whose journal Treue Zionswächter was the first regular Orthodox newspaper (signifying the coalescence of a distinct Orthodox mindset), rejected their call. Ettlinger, and German neo-Orthodoxy in his wake, chose to regard the modern secularized Jew as a transgressor rather than a schismatic. He adopted Maimonides' interpretation of the Talmudic concept tinok shenishba (captured infant), a Jew by birth who was not raised as such and therefore could be absolved for not practicing, and greatly expanded it to serve the Orthodox need to tolerate the nonobservant majority (many of their own congregants ignored strict practice). For example, he allowed congregants to drink wine poured by Sabbath desecrators, and to ignore other halakhic sanctions. Yet German neo-Orthodoxy could not legitimize nonobservance, and adopted a hierarchical approach, softer than traditional sanctions, but no less intent on differentiating sinners and righteous. Reform rabbis or lay leaders, considered ideological opponents, were castigated, while the common mass was to be carefully handled.

Some German neo-Orthodox believed that while doomed to minority status in their native country, their ideology could successfully confront modernity and unify Judaism in more traditional communities to the east. In 1847, Hirsch was elected Chief Rabbi of Moravia, where old rabbinic culture and yeshivas operated. His expectations were dashed as traditionalist rabbis scorned him for his European manners and lack of Talmudic acumen. They became enraged by his attempts to reform synagogues and to establish a rabbinical seminary including secular studies. The progressives viewed him as too conservative. After four years of constant strife, he lost faith in the possibility of reuniting the Jewish public. In 1851, a group in Frankfurt am Main that opposed the Reform character of the Jewish community turned to Hirsch. He led them for the remainder of his life, finding Frankfurt a hospitable site for his unique ideology, which amalgamated acculturation, dogmatic theology, thorough observance, and strict secession from the non-Orthodox.

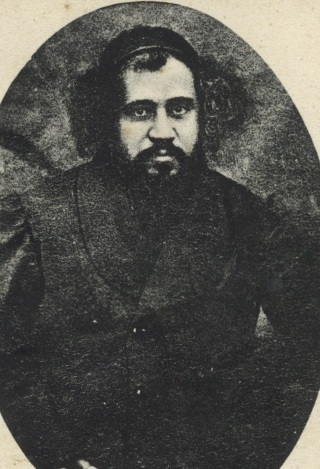
Chaim Sofer, the leading halakhic authority of the Hungarian "zealots" during the Orthodox-Neolog schism.

That year, Hildesheimer visited Hungary. Confounded by urbanization and acculturation – and the rise of Neology, a nonobservant laity served by rabbis who mostly favoured the Positive-Historical approach – the elderly local rabbis at first welcomed Hildesheimer. He opened a modern school in Eisenstadt that combined secular and religious studies. Traditionalists such as Moshe Schick and Yehudah Aszód sent their sons to study there. Samuel Benjamin Sofer, the heir of late Hatam Sofer, considered appointing Hildesheimer as his assistant-rabbi in Pressburg and instituting secular studies in the city's great yeshiva. The rabbi of Eisenstadt believed that only a full-fledged modern rabbinical seminary could fulfill his neo-Orthodox agenda. In the 1850s and 1860s, however, a radical reactionary Orthodox party coalesced in the northeastern regions of Hungary. Led by Rabbi Hillel Lichtenstein, his son-in-law Akiva Yosef Schlesinger and decisor Chaim Sofer, the "zealots" were shocked by the demise of the traditional world into which they had been born. Like Moses Sofer a generation before them, these Orthodox émigrés moved east, to a pre-modern environment that they were determined to safeguard. Lichtenstein ruled out any compromise with modernity, insisting on maintaining Yiddish and traditional dress. They considered the Neologs as moving outside of Judaism, and were more concerned with neo-Orthodoxy, which they regarded as a thinly veiled gateway for a similar fate. Chaim Sofer summarized their view of Hildesheimer: "The wicked Hildesheimer is the horse and chariot of the Evil Inclination... All the heretics in the last century did not seek to undermine the Law and the Faith as he does."

In their struggle against acculturation, the Hungarian ultra-Orthodox struggled to provide strong halakhic arguments. Michael Silber wrote: "These issues, even most of the religious reforms, fell into gray areas not easily treated within Halakha. It was often too flexible or ambiguous, at times silent, or worse yet, embarrassingly lenient." Schlesinger was forced to venture outside of normative law, into mystical writings and other fringe sources, to buttress his ideology. Most Hungarian Orthodox rabbis, while sympathetic to the "zealots"' cause, dismissed their legal arguments. In 1865, the ultra-Orthodox convened in Nagymihály and issued a ban on various synagogue reforms, intended not against the Neologs but against developments in the Orthodox camp, especially after Samuel Sofer violated his father's expressed ban and instituted vernacular sermons in Pressburg. Schick, the country's most prominent decisor, and other leading rabbis refused to sign, though they did not publicly oppose the decree. Hildesheimer's planned seminary was too radical for the mainstream rabbis, and he became marginalized and isolated by 1864.

The internal Orthodox division was complicated by growing tension with the Neologs. In 1869, the Hungarian government convened a General Jewish Congress that was aimed at creating a national representative body. Fearing Neolog domination, the Orthodox seceded from the Congress and appealed to Parliament in the name of religious freedom. This demonstrated the internalization of the new circumstances. In 1851, Orthodox leader Meir Eisenstaedter petitioned the authorities to restore the coercive powers of the communities. In 1871 the government recognized a separate Orthodox national committee. Communities that refused to join either side, labeled "Status Quo", were subject to Orthodox condemnation. However, the Orthodox tolerated nonobservant Jews as long as they affiliated with the national committee: Adam Ferziger claimed that membership and loyalty, rather than beliefs and ritual behavior, emerged as the definitive manifestation of Jewish identity. The Hungarian schism was the most radical internal separation among the Jews of Europe. Hildesheimer returned to Germany soon after, disillusioned though not as pessimistic as Hirsch. He was appointed rabbi of the Orthodox sub-community in Berlin (which had separate religious institutions but was not formally independent of the Liberal majority), where he finally established his seminary.

In 1877, a law enabling Jews to secede from their communities without conversion was passed in Germany. It was a stark example that Judaism was now confessional, not corporate. Hirsch withdrew his congregation from the Frankfurt community and decreed that all Orthodox should do the same. However, unlike the heterogeneous communities of Hungary, which often consisted of recent immigrants, Frankfurt and most German communities were close-knit. The majority of Hirsch's congregants enlisted Rabbi Seligman Baer Bamberger, who was older and more conservative. Bamberger was concerned with the principal of unity among the People Israel and dismissive of Hirsch, whom he regarded as unlearned and overly assimilated. He decreed that since the mother community was willing to finance Orthodox services and allow them religious freedom, secession was unwarranted. Eventually, less than 80 families from Hirsch's 300-strong congregation followed their rabbi. The vast majority of the 15%–20% of German Jews affiliated with Orthodox institutions cared little for the polemics. They did not secede over reasons of finance and familial relations. Only a handful of Secessionist, Austrittorthodox, communities were established in the Reich; almost everyone remained Communal Orthodox, Gemeindeortodox, within Liberal mother congregations. The Communal Orthodox argued that their approach was true to Jewish unity and decisive in maintaining public standards of observance and traditional education in Liberal communities. They claimed that Secessionists viewed them as hypocritical middle-of-the-roaders.

The conflicts in Hungary and Germany, and the emergence of distinctly Orthodox communities and ideologies, were the exception rather than the rule in Central and Western Europe. France, Britain, Bohemia, Austria and other countries saw both a virtual disappearance of observance and serious interest in bridging Judaism and modernity. The official rabbinate remained technically traditional, not introducing ideological change. The organ – a symbol of Reform in Germany since 1818, so much that Hildesheimer seminarians had to sign a declaration that they would never serve in a synagogue that introduced one – was accepted with little qualm by the French Consistoire in 1856. It was part of a series of synagogue regulations passed by Chief Rabbi Salomon Ulmann. Even Rabbi Solomon Klein of Colmar, the leader of Alsatian conservatives who partook in the castigation of Zecharias Frankel, allowed the instrument in his community. In England, Rabbi Nathan Marcus Adler's United Synagogue shared a similar approach: It was vehemently conservative in principle and combated ideological reformers, yet served a nonobservant public – as Todd Endelman noted, "While respectful of tradition, most English-born Jews were not orthodox in terms of personal practice. Nonetheless they were content to remain within an orthodox congregational framework" – and introduced considerable synagogue reforms.

=== Eastern Europe ===
The much belated pace of modernization in Russia, Congress Poland and the Romanian principalities, where harsh discrimination and active persecution of the Jews continued until 1917, delayed the crisis of traditional society for decades. Old-style education in the heder and yeshiva remained the norm, retaining Hebrew as the language of the elite and Yiddish as the vernacular. The defining fault-line of Eastern European Jews was between the Hasidim and the Misnagdic reaction against them. Reform attempts by the Czar's government, like the school modernization under Max Lilienthal or the foundation of rabbinical seminaries and the mandating of communities to appoint clerks known as "official rabbis", all had little influence. Communal autonomy and the rabbinic courts' jurisdiction were abolished in 1844, but economic and social seclusion remained, ensuring the authority of Jewish institutions and traditions de facto. In 1880, there were only 21,308 Jewish pupils in government schools, out of some 5 million Jews in total; In 1897, 97% of the 5.2 million Jews in the Pale of Settlement and Congress Poland declared Yiddish their mother tongue, and only 26% possessed any literacy in Russian. Though the Eastern European Haskalah challenged the traditional establishment – unlike its western counterpart, no acculturation process turned it irrelevant; it flourished from the 1820s until the 1890s – the latter's hegemony over the vast majority was self-evident. The leading rabbis maintained the old conception of communal unity: In 1882, when an Orthodox party in Galicia appealed for the right of secession, the Netziv and other Russian rabbis declared it forbidden and contradicting the idea of Israel's oneness.

While slow, change was by no means absent. In the 1860s and 1870s, anticipating a communal disintegration like the one in the west, moderate maskilic rabbis like Yitzchak Yaacov Reines and Yechiel Michel Pines called for inclusion of secular studies in the heders and yeshivas, a careful modernization, and an ecumenical attempt to form a consensus on necessary adaptation of halakha to novel times. Their initiative was thwarted by a combination of strong anti-traditional invective on behalf of the radical, secularist maskilim and conservative intransigence from the leading rabbis, especially during the bitter polemic which erupted after Moshe Leib Lilienblum's 1868 call for a reconsideration of Talmudic strictures. Reines, Pines and their associates gradually formed the nucleus of Religious Zionism, while their conservative opponents eventually adopted the epithet Haredim (then, and also much later, still a generic term for the observant and the pious).

The attitude toward Jewish nationalism, particularly Zionism, and its nonobservant if not staunchly secularist leaders and partisans, was the key question facing the traditionalists of Eastern Europe. Closely intertwined were issues of modernization in general: As noted by Joseph Salmon, the future religious Zionists (organized in the Mizrahi since 1902) were not only supportive of the national agenda per se, but deeply motivated by criticism of the prevalent Jewish society, a positive reaction to modernity and a willingness to tolerate nonobservance while affirming traditional faith and practice. Their proto-Haredi opponents sharply rejected all of the former positions and espoused staunch conservatism, which idealized existing norms. Any illusion that differences could be blanded and a united observant pro-Zionist front would be formed, were dashed between 1897 and 1899, as both the Eastern European nationalist intellectuals and Theodor Herzl himself revealed an uncompromising secularist agenda, forcing traditionalist leaders to pick sides. In 1900, the anti-Zionist pamphlet Or la-Yesharim, endorsed by many Russian and Polish rabbis, largely demarcated the lines between the proto-Haredi majority and the Mizrahi minority, and terminated dialogue; in 1911, when the 10th World Zionist Congress voted in favour of propagating non-religious cultural work and education, a large segment of the Mizrahi seceded and joined the anti-Zionists.

In 1907, Eastern European proto-Haredi elements formed the Knesseth Israel party, a modern framework created in recognition of the deficiencies of existing institutions. It dissipated within a year. German Neo-Orthodoxy, in the meantime, developed a keen interest in the traditional Jewish masses of Russia and Poland; if at the past they were considered primitive, a disillusionment with emancipation and enlightenment made many young assimilated German Orthodox youth embark on journeys to East European yeshivot, in search of authenticity. The German secessionists already possessed a platform of their own, the Freie Vereinigung für die Interessen des Orthodoxen Judentums, founded by Samson Raphael Hirsch in 1885. In 1912, two German FVIOJ leaders, Isaac Breuer and Jacob Rosenheim, managed to organize a meeting of 300 seceding Mizrahi, proto-Haredi and secessionist Neo-Orthodox delegate in Katowice, creating the Agudath Israel party. While the Germans were a tiny minority in comparison to the Eastern Europeans, their modern education made them a prominent elite in the new organization, which strove to provide a comprehensive response to world Jewry's challenges in a strictly observant spirit. The Agudah immediately formed its Council of Torah Sages as supreme rabbinic leadership body. Many ultra-traditionalist elements in Eastern Europe, like the Belz and Lubavitch Hasidim, refused to join, viewing the movement as a dangerous innovation; and the organized Orthodox in Hungary rejected it as well, especially after it did not affirm a commitment to communal secession in 1923.

In the Interwar period, sweeping secularization and acculturation deracinated old Jewish society in Eastern Europe. The October Revolution granted civil equality and imposed anti-religious persecutions, radically transforming Russian Jewry within a decade; the lifting of formal discrimination also strongly affected the Jews of independent Poland, Lithuania and other states. In the 1930s, it was estimated that no more than 20%–33% of Poland's Jews, the last stronghold of traditionalism where many were still living in rural and culturally secluded communities, could be considered strictly observant. Only upon having become an embattled (though still quite large) minority, did the local traditionalists complete their transformation into Orthodox, albeit never as starkly as in Hungary or Germany. Eastern European Orthodoxy, whether Agudah or Mizrahi, always preferred cultural and educational independence to communal secession, and maintained strong ties and self-identification with the general Jewish public. Within its ranks, the 150-years-long struggle between Hasidim and Misnagdim was largely subsided; the latter were even dubbed henceforth as "Litvaks", as the anti-Hasidic component in their identity was marginalized. In the interwar period, Rabbi Yisrael Meir Kagan emerged as the popular leader of the Eastern European Orthodox, particularly the Agudah-leaning.

=== United States ===
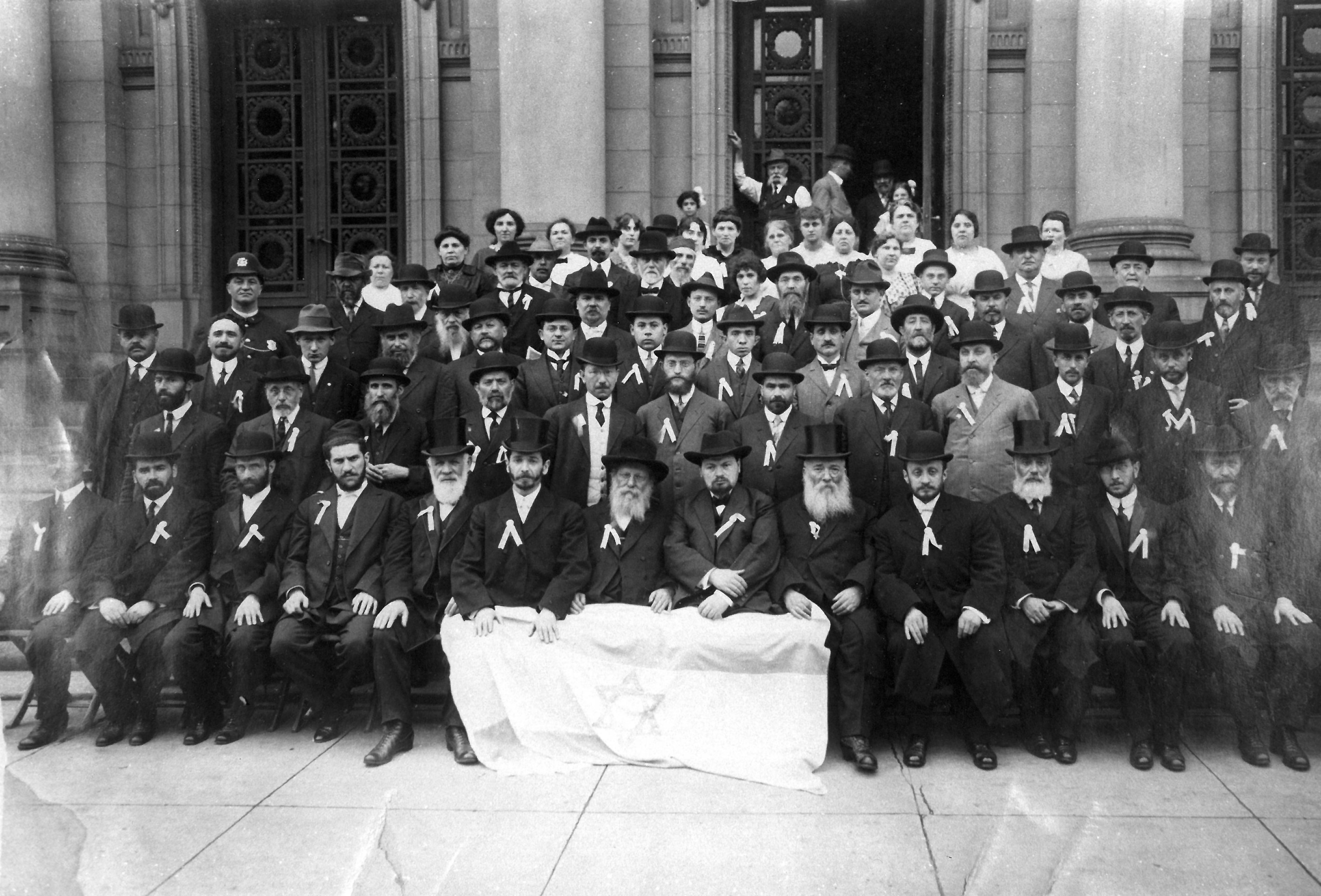
An assembly of American Orthodox rabbis, 1920.

American Jewry of the 19th century was small and immigrant-based, lacking traditional institutions or strong rabbinic presence. Voluntary congregations, rather than corporate communities, were the norm; separation of church and state, and dynamic religiosity of the independent Protestant model, shaped synagogue life. In the mid-19th century, Reform Judaism spread rapidly, advocating a formal relinquishment of traditions very few in the secularized, open environment observed anyhow; the United States would be derisively named the Treife Medina, or "Profane Country", in Yiddish. Conservative elements, concerned mainly with public standards of observance in critical fields like marriage, rallied around Isaac Leeser. Lacking a rabbinic ordination and little knowledgeable by European standards, Leeser was an ultra-traditionalist in his American milieu. In 1845 he introduced the words "Orthodox" and "Orthodoxy" into the American Jewish discourse, in the sense of opposing Reform; while admiring Samson Raphael Hirsch, Leeser was an even stauncher proponent of Zecharias Frankel, whom he considered the "leader of the Orthodox party" at a time when Positive-Historical and Orthodox positions were barely discernible from each other to most observers (in 1861, Leeser defended Frankel in the polemic instigated by Hirsch).

A broad non-Reform camp slowly coalesced as the minority within American Jewry; while strict in relation to their progressive opponents, they served a nonobservant public and instituted thorough synagogue reforms – omission of piyyutim from the liturgy, English-language sermons and secular education for the clergy were the norm in most, and many Orthodox synagogues in America did not partition men and women. In 1885, the antinomian Pittsburgh Platform moved a broad coalition of conservative religious leaders to found the Jewish Theological Seminary of America. They variously termed their ideology, which was never consistent and mainly motivated by a rejection of Reform, as "Enlightened Orthodoxy" or "Conservative Judaism". The latter term would only gradually assume a clearly distinct meaning.

To their right, strictly traditionalist Eastern European immigrants formed the Union of Orthodox Rabbis in 1902, in direct opposition to the Americanized character of the OU and JTS. The UOR frowned upon English-language sermons, secular education, and acculturation in general. Even before that, in 1897, an old-style yeshiva, RIETS, was founded in New York. Eventually, its students rebelled in 1908, demanding a modern rabbinic training much like that of their peers in JTS. In 1915, RIETS was reorganized as a decidedly Modern Orthodox institution, and a merger with the JTS was discussed. In 1923, the Rabbinical Council of America was established as the clerical association of the OU.

Only in the postwar era, did the vague traditional coalition come to a definite end. During and after the Holocaust, a new wave of strictly observant refugees arrived from Eastern and Central Europe. They often regarded even the UOR as too lenient and Americanized. Typical of these was Rabbi Aaron Kotler, who established Lakewood Yeshiva in New Jersey during 1943. Alarmed by the enticing American environment, Kotler turned his institution into an enclave, around which an entire community slowly evolved. It was very different from his prewar yeshiva at Kletsk, Poland, the students of which were but a segment of the general Jewish population and mingled with the rest. Lakewood pioneered the homogeneous, voluntary and enclavist model of postwar Haredi communities, which were independent entities with their own developing subculture. The new arrivals soon dominated the traditionalist wing of American Jewry, forcing the locals to adopt more rigorous positions. Concurrently, the younger generation in the JTS and the Rabbinical Assembly demanded greater clarity, theological unambiguity and halakhic independence from the Orthodox veto on serious innovations—in 1935, for example, the RA yielded to such pressures and shelved its proposal for a solution to the agunah predicament. "Conservative Judaism", now adopted as an exclusive label by most JTS graduates and RA members, became a truly distinct movement. In 1950, the Conservatives signaled their break with Orthodox halakhic authorities, with the acceptance of a far-reaching legal decision, which allowed one to drive to the synagogue and to use electricity on Sabbath.

Between the ultra-Orthodox and Conservatives, Modern Orthodoxy in America also coalesced, becoming less a generic term and more a distinct movement. Its leader in the postwar era, Rabbi Joseph B. Soloveitchik, left Agudas Israel to adopt both pro-Zionist positions and a positive, if reserved, attitude toward Western culture. As dean of RIETS and honorary chair of RCA's halakha committee, Soloveitchik shaped Modern Orthodoxy for decades. While principled differences with the Conservatives were clear, as the RCA stressed the divinely revealed status of the Torah and a strict observance of halakha, sociological boundaries were less so. Many members of the Modern Orthodox public were barely observant, and a considerable number of communities did not install a gender partition in their synagogues – physically separate seating became the distinguishing mark of Orthodox/Conservative affiliation in the 1950s, and was strongly promulgated by the RCA – for many years. As late as 1997, seven OU congregations still lacked a partition.

== Theology ==
=== Orthodox attitudes ===
Judaism never formulated a conclusive creed; whether it reflects a dogma remains controversial. Some researchers argued that the importance of daily practice and adherence to halakha (Jewish law) mooted theoretical issues. Others dismissed this view entirely, citing ancient rabbinic debates that castigated various heresies with little reference to observance. However, even without a uniform doctrine, Orthodox Judaism is basically united in its core beliefs. Disavowing them is a major blasphemy..

Several medieval authorities attempted to codify these beliefs, including Saadia Gaon and Joseph Albo. Each composed a creed, although the 13 principles expounded by Maimonides in his 1160s Commentary on the Mishna, remained the most widely accepted. Various points were contested by many of Maimonides' contemporaries and later sages, such as the exact formulation and the status of disbelievers (either misinformed or expelled heretics). Similarly, Albo listed only three fundamentals, and did not regard the Messiah as a key tenet. Many who objected argued that the entire corpus of the Torah and the sayings of ancient sages were of canonical stature, rather than a few selected points. In later centuries, the 13 Principles became considered universally binding and cardinal by Orthodox authorities.

During the Middle Ages, two systems of thought competed for primacy. The rationalist-philosophic school endeavored to present all commandments as serving higher moral and ethical purposes, while the mystical tradition, exemplified in Kabbalah, assigned each rite with a role in hidden dimensions of reality. Sheer obedience, derived from faithfulness to one's community and ancestry, was believed sufficient for the common people, while the educated chose one of the two schools. In the modern era, the prestige of both declined, and "naive faith" became popular. At a time when contemplation in matters of belief was associated with secularization, luminaries such as Yisrael Meir Kagan stressed the importance of simple, unsophisticated commitment to the precepts passed down from the Beatified Sages. This became standard in the Haredi world.

=== God ===
Judaism adheres to monotheism, the belief in one God. The basic tenets of Orthodoxy, drawn from ancient sources like the Talmud and later sages, chiefly include the attributes of God in Judaism: one and indivisible, preceding all creation, which God alone brought into being, eternal, omniscient, omnipotent, absolutely incorporeal, and beyond human reason. This basis is evoked in many foundational texts, and is repeated often in daily prayers, such as in Judaism's creed-like Shema Yisrael: "Hear, O Israel, the Lord is our God, the Lord is One."

Maimonides delineated this understanding of a personal God in his opening six articles. The six concern God's status as the sole creator, his oneness, his impalpability, that he is first and last, that God alone, and no other being, may be worshipped, and that he is omniscient. The supremacy of the God of Israel is even applied to non-Jews. According to most rabbinic opinions, non-Jews are banned from the worship of other deities. However, they are allowed to "associate" lower divine beings with their faith in God (mostly to allow contact with Christians, accepting that they were not idolaters with whom business dealings and the like are forbidden.)

The utter imperceptibility of God, considered as beyond human reason and only reachable through what he chooses to reveal, was emphasized among others in the ancient ban on making any image of him. Maimonides and virtually all sages in his time and thereafter stressed that the creator is incorporeal, lacking "any semblance of a body". While incorporeality has almost been taken for granted since the Middle Ages, Maimonides and his contemporaries reported that anthropomorphic conceptions of God were quite common in their time.

The medieval tension between God's transcendence and equanimity, and his contact and interest in his creation, found its most popular resolution in the Kabbalah. Kabbalists asserted that while God himself is beyond the universe, he progressively unfolds into the created realm via a series of emanations, or sefirot, each a refraction of the perfect godhead. While widely received, this system proved contentious and some authorities lambasted it as a threat to God's unity. In modern times it is upheld, at least tacitly, in many traditionalist Orthodox circles, while Modern Orthodoxy mostly simply ignores it.

=== Revelation ===
The defining doctrine of Orthodox Judaism is the belief that God revealed the Torah ("Teaching" or "Law") to Moses on Mount Sinai, both the written scripture of the Torah and the Oral Torah explicating it, and that sages promulgated it faithfully from Sinai in an unbroken chain. One of the foundational texts of rabbinic literature is the list opening the Pirkei Avot, enumerating the sages, from Moses through Joshua, the Seventy Elders, and Prophets, and then onward until Hillel the Elder and Shammai. This core belief is referred to in classical sources as "The Law/Teaching is from the Heavens" (Torah min HaShamayim).

Orthodoxy holds that the body of revelation is total and complete. Its interpretation and application under new circumstances, required of every generation's scholars, is an act of inferring and elaborating, not of innovation or addition. One clause in the Jerusalem Talmud asserts that anything that a veteran disciple shall teach was given at Sinai: a story in the Babylonian Talmud claims that Moses was taken aback upon seeing the immensely intricate deduction of future Rabbi Akiva in a vision, until Akiva proclaimed that Moses had received everything he was teaching. The Written and Oral Torah are held to be intertwined and mutually reliant. The latter is a source of many divine commandments, and the text of the Pentateuch is seen as incomprehensible. God's will may be surmised only by appealing to the Oral Torah, which revealed the text's allegorical, anagogical, or tropological meaning, rather than by a literal reading.

Lacunae in received tradition or disagreements between early sages are attributed to disruptions, especially persecutions such that "the Torah was forgotten in Israel." According to rabbinic lore, these eventually compelled the legists to write down the Oral Law in the Mishna and Talmud. The wholeness of the original divine message and the reliability of those who transmitted it are axiomatic. One of the primary intellectual exercises of Torah scholars is to locate discrepancies between Talmudic or other passages and then demonstrate by complex logical steps (presumably proving each passage referred to a slightly different situation, etc.) that no contradiction is obtained. Orthodox Judaism considers revelation as propositional, explicit, verbal, and unambiguous. Revelation serves as a firm source of authority for religious commandments. Modernist understandings of revelation as a subjective, humanly conditioned experience are rejected. Some thinkers at the liberal end of the liberal wing promoted such views, although they found virtually no acceptance from the establishment.

An important ramification of Torah min HaShamayim in modern times is the reserved, and often totally rejectionist, attitude of Orthodoxy toward the historical-critical method, particularly higher Biblical criticism. The refusal by rabbis to employ such tools, insisting on traditional methods and the need for consensus and continuity with past authorities, separates the most liberal-leaning Orthodox rabbinic circles from the most conservative non-Orthodox ones.

While the Sinai event is held to be the supreme act of revelation, rabbinic tradition acknowledges matters addressed by the Prophets and God's later announcements. The Kabbalah, as revealed to illustrious past figures and passed on through elitist circles, is widely (albeit not universally) esteemed. While some prominent rabbis considered Kabbalah a late forgery, most generally accepted it as legitimate. However, its status in determining normative halakhic decision-making, which is binding for the entire community, and not just for spiritualists who voluntarily adopt kabbalistic strictures, was always controversial. Leading decisors openly applied criteria from Kabbalah in their rulings, while others did so only inadvertently, and many denied it any normative role. A closely related mystical phenomenon is the belief in Magidim, supposed dreamlike apparitions or visions, that may inform those who experience them with certain divine knowledge.

=== Eschatology ===
Belief in a future Messiah is central to Orthodox Judaism. According to this doctrine, a king will arise from King David's lineage, and will bring with him signs such as the restoration of the Temple, peace, and universal acceptance of the God of Israel. The Messiah will embark on a quest to gather all Jews to the Holy Land, will proclaim prophethood, and will restore the Davidic Monarchy.

Classical Judaism incorporated a tradition of belief in the resurrection of the dead. The scriptural basis for this doctrine, as quoted by the Mishnah is: "All Israelites have a share in the World-to-Come, as it is written: "And your people, all of them righteous, Shall possess the land for all time; They are the shoot that I planted, My handiwork in which I glory.". The Mishnah also brands as heretics any Jew who rejects the doctrine of resurrection or its Torah origin. Those who deny the doctrine are deemed to receive no share in the World-to-Come. The Pharisees believed in both a bodily resurrection and an immortal soul. They also believed that acts in this world would affect the state of life in the next world. Mishnah Sahedrin 10 clarifies that only those who follow the correct theology have a place in the World to Come.

Other passing references to the afterlife appear in Mishnaic tractates. Berakhot informs that the Jewish belief in the afterlife was established long before the compilation of the Mishnah. Biblical tradition mentions Sheol sixty-five times. It is described as an underworld containing the gathering of the dead with their families. Numbers 16:30states that Korah went into Sheol alive to describe his death in divine retribution. The deceased who reside in Sheol have a "nebulous" existence. No reward or punishment comes in Sheol, which is represented as a dark and gloomy place. But a distinction is made for kings who are said to be greeted by other kings when entering Sheol. Biblical poetry suggests that resurrection from Sheol is possible. Prophetic narratives of resurrection in the Bible have been labelled as an external cultural influence by some scholars.

Talmudic discourse expanded on the details of the World to Come. This was to motivate Jewish compliance with religious codes. In brief, the righteous will be rewarded with a place in Gan Eden, the wicked will be punished in Gehinnom, and the resurrection will take place in the Messianic age. The sequence of these events is unclear. Rabbis support the concept of resurrection with Biblical citations and show it as a sign of God's omnipotence.

== Practice ==
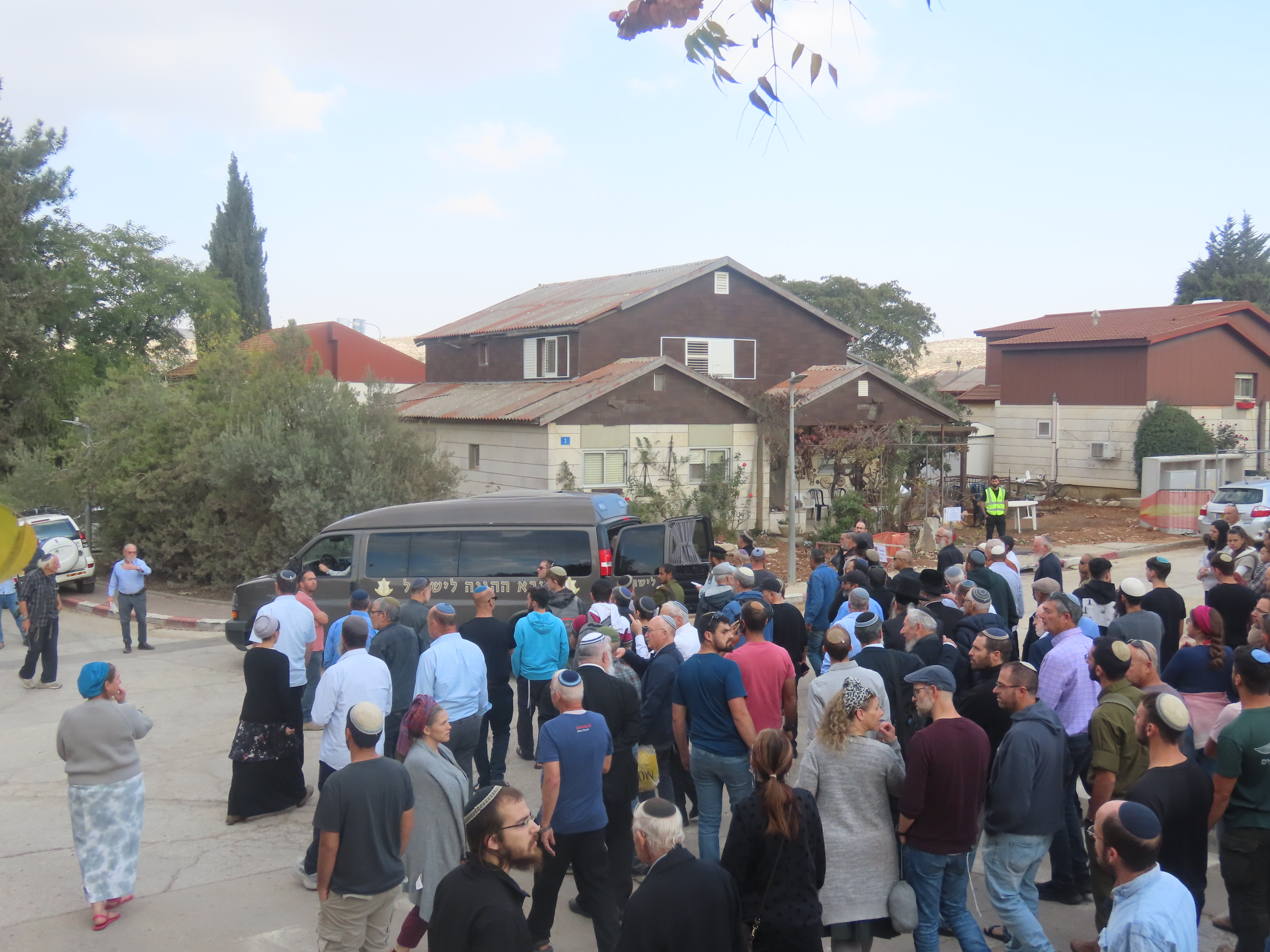
A crowd of Orthodox Jewish men and women, usually defined as "Religious Zionist", in Israel

=== Intensity ===
A relatively thorough observance of halakha – rather than theological and doctrinal matters, which produce diverse opinions – is the concrete demarcation line separating Orthodoxy from other Jewish movements. As noted by researchers and communal leaders, Orthodox subgroups have a sense of commitment towards the Law, perceiving it as seriously binding, which is rarely visible outside the movement.

=== Law, custom, and tradition ===
The halakha, like any jurisprudence, is not a definitive set of rules, but rather an expanding discourse. Its authority is derived from the belief in divine revelation, but rabbis interpret and apply it, basing their mandate on biblical verses such as and thou shalt observe to do according to all that they inform thee. From ancient to modern times, rabbinic discourse was wrought with controversy (machloket) and sages disagreeing over various points of law. The Talmud itself is mainly a record of such disputes. The Orthodox continue to believe that such disagreements flow naturally from the divinity of Jewish Law, which is presumed to contain a solution for any possible question. As long as both contesting parties base their arguments on received hermeneutics and precedents and are driven by sincere faith, both these and those are the words of the Living God (Talmudic statement originally attributed to a divine proclamation during a dispute between the House of Hillel and House of Shammai). Majority opinions were accepted and reified, though many disagreements remain unresolved as new ones appear. This plurality of opinion allows decisors, rabbis tasked with determining the legal stance in subjects without precedent, to weigh a range of options, based on methods derived from earlier authorities. The most basic form of halakhic discourse is the responsa literature, in which rabbis answered questions directed from commoners or other rabbis, thus setting precedent.

The system's oldest and most basic sources are the Mishna and the Talmuds, augmented by the Geonim. Those were followed by the great codes which sought to assemble and standardize the laws, including Rabbi Isaac Alfasi's Hilchot HaRif, Maimonides' Mishneh Torah, and Rabbi Asher ben Jehiel's work (colloquially called the Rosh). These three works were the main basis of Rabbi Jacob ben Asher's Arba'ah Turim, which in turn became the basis of one of the latest and most authoritative codifications – the 1565 Shulchan Aruch, or "Set Table", by Rabbi Joseph Karo. This work gained canonical status and became almost synonymous, with the halakhic system. However, no later authority accepted it in its entirety (for example, Orthodox Jews wear phylacteries in a manner different from the one advocated there), and it was immediately contested or re-interpreted by various commentaries, most prominently the gloss written by Rabbi Moses Isserles named HaMapah ("The Tablecloth"). Halakhic literature continued to expand and evolve. New authoritative guides continued to be compiled and canonized, until the popular 20th century works such as the Mishnah Berurah arrived.

The most important distinction within halakha is between all laws derived from God's revelation (d'Oraita) and those enacted by human authorities (d'Rabanan), who are believed to have been empowered by God to legislate as necessary. The former are either directly understood, derived via various hermeneutics or attributed to commandments handed down to Moses. The authority to pass measures d'Rabanan is itself subject to debate – Maimonides stated that absolute obedience to rabbinic decrees is stipulated by the verse and thou shalt observe, while Nachmanides argued that such severity is unfounded, while accepting such enactments as binding, albeit less so than the divine commandments. A Talmudic maxim states that when in doubt regarding a matter d'Oraita, one must rule strenuously, but leniently when it concerns d'Rabanan. Many arguments in halakhic literature revolve over whether a detail is derived from the former or the latter source, and under which circumstances. Commandments or prohibitions d'Rabanan, though less stringent than d'Oraita, are an important facet of Jewish law. They range from the 2nd century BCE establishment of Hanukkah, to bypassing the Biblical ban on charging interest via the Prozbul, and up to the 1950 marital rules standardized by the Chief Rabbinate of Israel, which forbade polygamy and levirate marriage even in communities that still practiced them.

A third major component buttressing Orthodox and other practice is local or familial custom, Minhag. The development and acceptance of customs as binding, more than disagreements between decisors, is the main source of diversity in matters of practice across geographic or ethnic boundaries. While the reverence accorded to Minhag across rabbinic literature covers the extremes, including "a custom may uproot halakha" and wholly dismissive attitudes, it was generally accepted as binding by scholars, and drew its power from popular adherence and routine. Ashkenazim, Sephardim, Teimanim, and others have distinct prayer rites, kosher emphases (for example, by the 12th century, it became an Ashkenazi custom to avoid legumes in Passover) and other distinctions. The influence of custom upset scholars who noted that the common masses observe Minhag, yet ignore important divine decrees.

=== Rabbinic authority ===
Rabbinic leadership, assigned with implementing and interpreting tradition, changed considerably over the centuries, separating Orthodox from pre-modern Judaism. Since the demise of the Geonim, who led the Jewish world up to 1038, halakha was adjudicated locally, and the final arbiter was mostly the local rabbi, the Mara d'Athra (Master of the Area). He was responsible to judicially instruct his community. Emancipation and modern transport and communication made this model untenable. While Orthodox communities, especially the more conservative ones, have rabbis who technically fill this capacity, the public generally follows more broadly known authorities who are not limited by geography, and based on reverence and peer pressure more than coercion. These may be either popular chairs of Talmudic academies, renowned decisors, and, in the Hasidic world, hereditary rebbes.

Their influence varies considerably: In conservative Orthodox circles, mainly Haredi, rabbis possess strong authority, and often exercise leadership. Bodies such as the Council of Torah Sages, Council of Torah Luminaries, the Central Rabbinical Congress, and the Orthodox Council of Jerusalem are all held as the arbiters in their respective communities. In the more liberal Orthodox sectors, rabbis are revered and consulted, but rarely exert direct control.

=== Daily life ===
Orthodox Judaism emphasizes practicing rules of kashrut, Shabbat, family purity and tefilah (daily prayer).

Many Orthodox can be identified by their dress and family lifestyle. Orthodox men and women dress modestly, covering most of their skin. Married women cover their hair with scarves (tichel), veils, snoods, turbans, hats, berets or wigs.

Orthodox men wear a ritual fringe called Tzitzit and wear a head-covering. Many men grow beards, and Haredi men wear suits with black hats over a skullcap. Modern Orthodox Jews may adopt the dress of general society, although they, too, wear kippahs and tzitzit. On Shabbat, Modern Orthodox men wear suits (or at least a dress shirt) and dress pants.

Orthodox Jews follow the laws of negiah (touch). The Orthodox do not engage in physical contact with those of the opposite sex other than their spouse or immediate family members. Kol Isha prohibits a woman's singing to a man (except as per negiah).

Doorposts have a mezuzah. Separate sinks for meat and dairy have become increasingly common.

== Diversity ==
Orthodox Judaism lacks a central framework and a common leadership. It is not a "denomination" in the structural sense, but a spectrum of groups, united in broadly affirming matters of belief and practice, which share a consciousness and a common discourse. Individual rabbis often gain respect across boundaries, particularly recognized decisors, but each community largely elevates its own leaders (for example, the Haredi world shares a sense of common identity, while distinct subgroups include hundreds of independent communities with their own rabbis). The limits and boundaries of Orthodoxy are also controversial. No encompassing definition has found acceptance. Moderately conservative subgroups hotly criticize more liberal groups for deviation, while strict hard-liners dismiss the latter as non-Orthodox. Contentious topics range from the abstract and theoretical, such as the attitude toward the study of scripture, to the mundane and pressing, such as modesty rules.

As in any other broad religious movement, an intrinsic tension connects the ideological and the sociological dimensions of Orthodox Judaism – while elites and intellectuals define adherence in theoretical terms, the masses use societal, familial, and institutional affiliation. The latter may be neither strictly observant nor fully accept the tenets of faith.

== Demographics ==
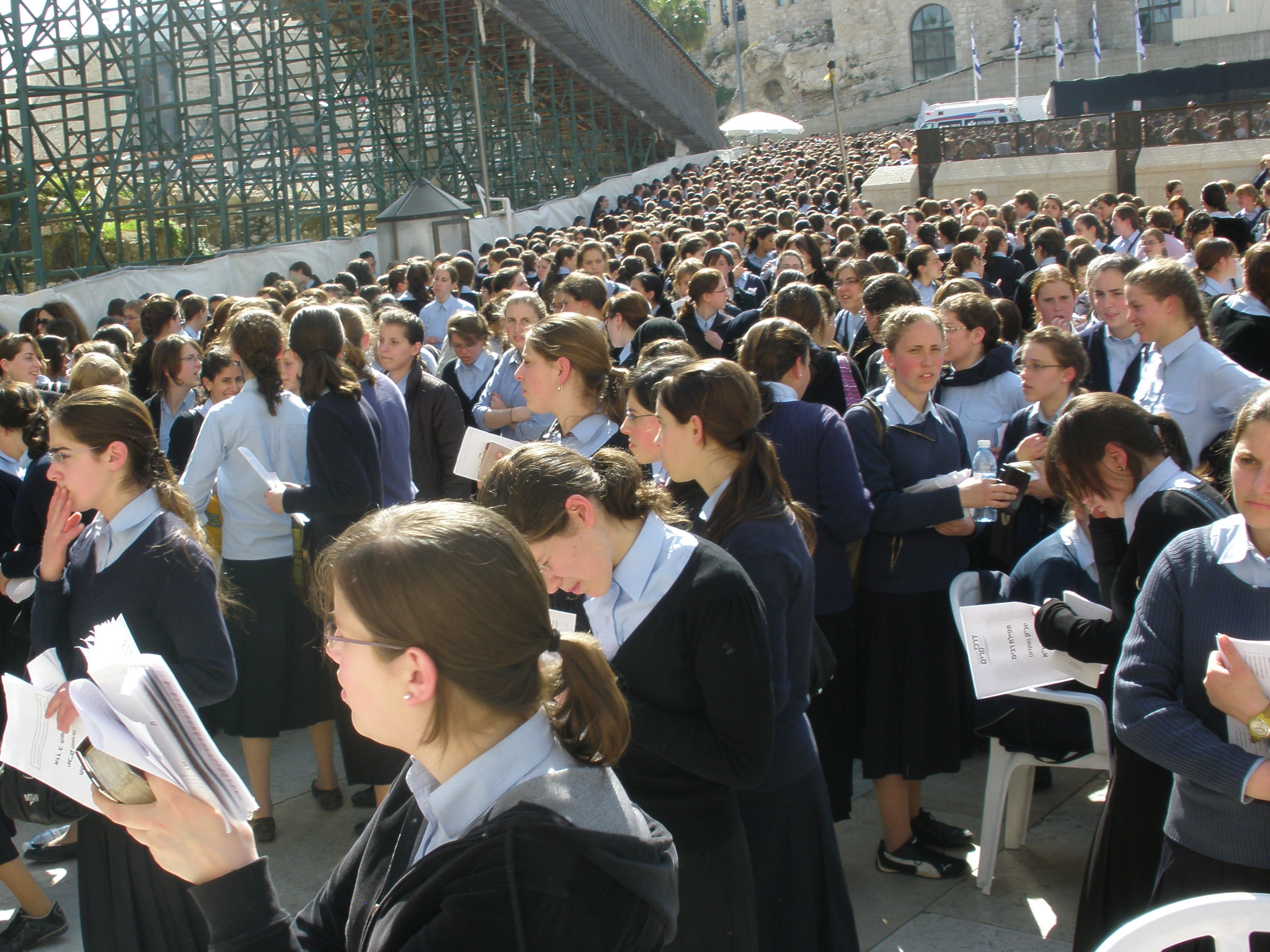
Haredi schoolgirls at the Western Wall in Jerusalem

Professors Daniel Elazar and Rela Mintz Geffen, according to calculations in 1990, found there to be at least 2,000,000 observant Orthodox Jews worldwide in 2012, and at least 2,000,000 additional members and supporters who identified as such. This estimate held Orthodoxy to be the largest Jewish group.

In the State of Israel, where the total Jewish population is about 6.5 million, 22% of all Jewish respondents to a 2016 Pew survey declared themselves as observant Orthodox (9% Haredim, 13% Datiim, "religious"). 29% described themselves as "traditional", a label implying less observance, but identification with Orthodoxy.

The Orthodox community of the United States is the second-largest in the world, concentrated in the Northeast and specifically in New York and New Jersey. A 2013 Pew survey found that 10% of respondents identified as Orthodox, among a total Jewish population of at least 5.5 million. 3% were Modern Orthodox, 6% were Haredi, and 1% were "other" (Sephardic, liberal Orthodox, etc.)

In the United Kingdom, of 79,597 households with at least one Jewish member that held synagogue membership in 2016, 66% affiliated with Orthodox synagogues: 53% in "centrist Orthodox", and 13% in "strictly Orthodox" (further 3% were Sephardi, which technically eschews the title "Orthodox").

The Orthodox have higher birth rates than others. Haredi communities have some of the world's highest birth rates, averaging six children per household. A nearly non-existent rate of intermarriage with members of other faiths (Orthodox vehemently oppose the phenomenon) contributes to their growing share of the world's Jewish population. Among American Jewish children, the Orthodox share is an estimated 61% in New York, including 49% Haredi. Similar patterns are observed in other countries. With present trends sustained, Orthodox Jews are projected to numerically dominate British Jewry by 2031, and American Jewry by 2058. However, large numbers of members leave their communities and observant lifestyle. Among the 2013 Pew respondents, 17% of those under 30 who were raised Orthodox disaffiliated (in earlier generations, this trend was far more prevalent, and 77% of those over 65 left).

== Groups ==
=== Haredim ===
The most recognizable sub-group is the Haredim (literally, 'trembling' or 'fervent'), also known as "strictly Orthodox" or "Ultra-Orthodox". They are the most traditional part of the Orthodox. Haredim have minimal engagement with/wholesale rejection of modern society, avow precedence to religious values, and accept a high degree of rabbinic involvement in daily life. Haredi rabbis and communities generally accept each other, and accord them legitimacy. They are organized in large political structures, mainly Agudath Israel of America and the Israeli United Torah Judaism party. Other organized groups include the Anti-Zionist Central Rabbinical Congress and the Edah HaChareidis. They are easily discerned by their mode of dress, often mostly black for men and very modest, by religious standards, for women (including hair covering, long skirts, etc.).

The Haredim may be roughly classified into three sub-groups:

==== Hasidic ====
Hasidic Jews originated in 18th-century Eastern Europe, where they formed as a revival movement that defied the rabbinical establishment. The threat of modernity turned the movement towards conservatism and reconciled it with traditionalist elements. Hasidism espouses a mystical interpretation of religion. Each Hasidic community aligned with a hereditary leader known as rebbe (who is almost always an ordained rabbi).

While the spiritualist element of Hasidism declined through the centuries, the rebbes' authority stems from the mystical belief that the holiness of their ancestors is inborn. They exercise tight control over their followers. Each of the hundreds of independent Hasidic groups/sects (also called "courts" or "dynasties") has its own line of rebbes. Groups range in size from large ones with thousands of member households to very small. Courts often possess unique customs, religious emphases, philosophies, and styles of dress. Hasidic men, especially on the Sabbath, don long garments and fur hats, which were once a staple of Eastern European Jews, but are now associated almost exclusively with them. As of 2016, 130,000 Hasidic households were counted.

==== Litvaks ====
The second Haredi group are the Litvaks, or Yeshivish. They originated, loosely, with the Misnagdim, the opponents of Hasidism, who were mainly concentrated in old Lithuania. The confrontation with the Hasid bred distinct ideologies and institutions, especially great yeshivas, learning halls, where the study of Torah for its own sake and admiration for the scholars who headed these schools was enshrined. With the advent of secularization, the Misnagdim largely abandoned their hostility towards Hasidism. They became defined by affiliation with their yeshivas, and their communities were sometimes composed of alumni. The prestige ascribed to them as centers of Torah study (after they were rebuilt in Israel and America, bearing the names of Eastern European yeshivas destroyed in the Holocaust) persuaded many who were not Misnagdic, and the term Litvak lost its original ethnic connotation. It is granted to all non-Hasidic Haredim of Ashkenazi descent. The Litvak sector is led mainly by heads of yeshivas.

==== Sephardic ====
The third Haredi movement consists of the Sephardic Haredim, who live mostly in Israel. There they are linked to the Shas party and the legacy of Rabbi Ovadia Yosef. Originating in the Mizrahi (Middle Eastern and North African Jews) immigrants to the country who arrived in the 1950s, most of the Sephardi Haredim were educated in Litvak yeshivas. They adopted their educators' mentality. Their identity developed in reaction to the racism they encountered. Shas arose in the 1980s, with the aim of reclaiming Sephardi religious legacy, in opposition to both secularism and the hegemony of European-descended Haredim. While living in strictly observant circles, they maintain a strong bond with non-Haredi masses of Israeli Mizrahi society.

=== Modern Orthodoxy ===
In the West, especially in the United States, Modern Orthodoxy, or "Centrist Orthodoxy", is an umbrella term for communities that seek an observant lifestyle and traditional theology, while at the same time ascribing positive value to engagement (if not "synthesis") with the modern world.

In the United States, the Modern Orthodox form a cohesive community, influenced by the legacy of leaders such as Rabbi Joseph B. Soloveitchik, and concentrated around Yeshiva University and institutions such as the OU or National Council of Young Israel. They affirm strict obedience to Jewish Law, the centrality of Torah study, and the importance of positive engagement with modern culture.

=== Religious Zionism ===
In Israel, Religious Zionism represents the largest Orthodox public and are fervent Zionists. Religious Zionism supports Israel and ascribes an inherent religious value to it. The dominant ideological school, influenced by Rabbi Abraham Isaac Kook's thought, regards the state in messianic terms. Religious Zionism is not a uniform group, and the split between its conservative flank (often named "Chardal", or "National-Haredi") and more liberal elements has increased since the 1990s. The National Religious Party, once the single political platform, dissolved, and the common educational system became torn on issues such as gender separation in elementary school or secular studies.

=== European Centrist Orthodoxy ===
In Europe, "Centrist Orthodoxy" is represented by organizations such as the British United Synagogue and the Israelite Central Consistory of France, both the dominant official rabbinates in their respective countries. The laity is often non-observant, retaining formal affiliation due to familial piety or a sense of Jewish identity.

=== Israeli Masorti (traditional) ===
Another large demographic usually considered Orthodox are the Israeli Masortim, or "traditionals". This moniker originated with Mizrahi immigrants who were secularized and reverent toward their communal heritage. However, Mizrahi intellectuals, in recent years, developed a more reflective, nuanced understanding of this term, eschewing its shallow image and not necessarily agreeing with the formal deference to Orthodox rabbis. Self-conscious Masorti identity is limited to small, elitist circles.

== See also ==
- Hashkafa
- Jewish fundamentalism
- List of Orthodox Jewish communities in the United States
- Open Orthodoxy
- Orthodoxy
