= Hildesheimer Rabbinical Seminary =

- בית המדרש לרבנים בברלין
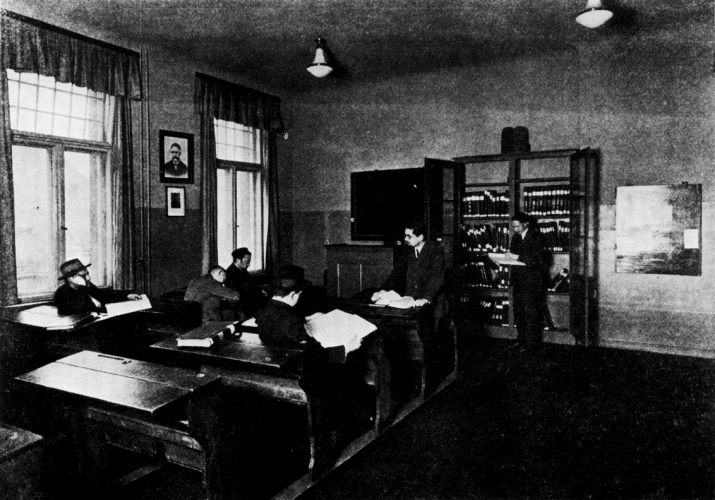
- Berlin Rabbinical Seminary, 25 years anniversary of work, 1898.
- Established: October 22, 1873
- Founder: Israel Hildesheimer
- Affiliations: Orthodox Judaism
- Location: Berlin, Germany; 52°31′36.9″N 13°23′36.8″E
- Dissolution: 1938
- Reestablishment: 2009
- Website: rabbinerseminar.de

The Hildesheimer Rabbinical Seminary (officially in German: Rabbinerseminar für das orthodoxe Judenthum in Berlin until 1880, thereafter Rabbiner-Seminar zu Berlin; in Hebrew: בית המדרש לרבנים בברלין, Bet ha-midrash le-Rabanim be-Berlin) was originally founded in Berlin on 22 October 1873 by Rabbi Dr. Israel Hildesheimer for the training of rabbis in the tradition of Orthodox Judaism. It was successfully reestablished in 2009 after having been dissolved in by the NSDAP in 1938.

== History ==
In accepting the call as the first rabbi of the new Berlin Orthodox congregation, the Israelite Synagogal Congregation of Adass Yisroel (Hebrew: עדת ישראל, German: Israelitische Synagogen-Gemeinde Adass Jisroel zu Berlin) in 1869, Israel Hildesheimer stipulated that he should be allowed to continue his activities as rabbinical teacher just as he had done at his former rabbinical office in Eisenstadt, Hungary. After delivering lectures which attracted a great many pupils, he addressed ten prominent persons in different parts of Germany in 1872, and explained to them the necessity of organizing an Orthodox rabbinical seminary at Berlin. These men at once took up the subject, and a central committee was formed, which included Rabbi Joseph Altmann (1818–1874) of Karlsruhe (since 1860 member of the Oberrat der Israeliten Badens, i.e. supreme council of the Israelites of Baden), Rabbi Dr. Auerbach of Halberstadt, Chief Rabbi Dr. Solomon Cohn of Schwerin, Aron Hirsch Heymann (a banker) of Berlin, Gustav Hirsch of Berlin, Sally Lewisohn of Hamburg, and Emanuel Schwarzschild of Frankfurt am Main.

The seminary was dedicated on 22 October 1873. At the opening of the institution the faculty included the rector, Dr. Israel Hildesheimer, and two lecturers, Dr. David Hoffmann (for the Talmud, ritual codices, and Pentateuch exegesis) and Dr. Abraham Berliner (for post-Talmudic history, history of literature, and auxiliary sciences). In 1874, Dr. Jacob Barth, subsequently son-in-law of Hildesheimer, was added to the faculty as lecturer in Hebrew, exegesis of the Bible with the exception of the Pentateuch, and religious philosophy. Dr. Hirsch Hildesheimer, son of the founder and a graduate of the seminary, was appointed in 1882 lecturer in Jewish history and the geography of Palestine. When Dr. Solomon Cohn removed to Berlin from Schwerin in 1876 he took charge of the courses in theoretic and practical homiletics, continuing them until he went to Breslau in 1894.

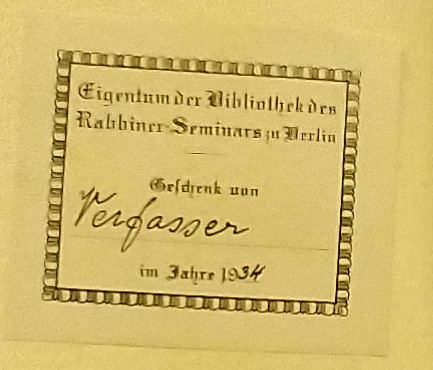
Bookplate, gift from the author to the seminary in 1934.

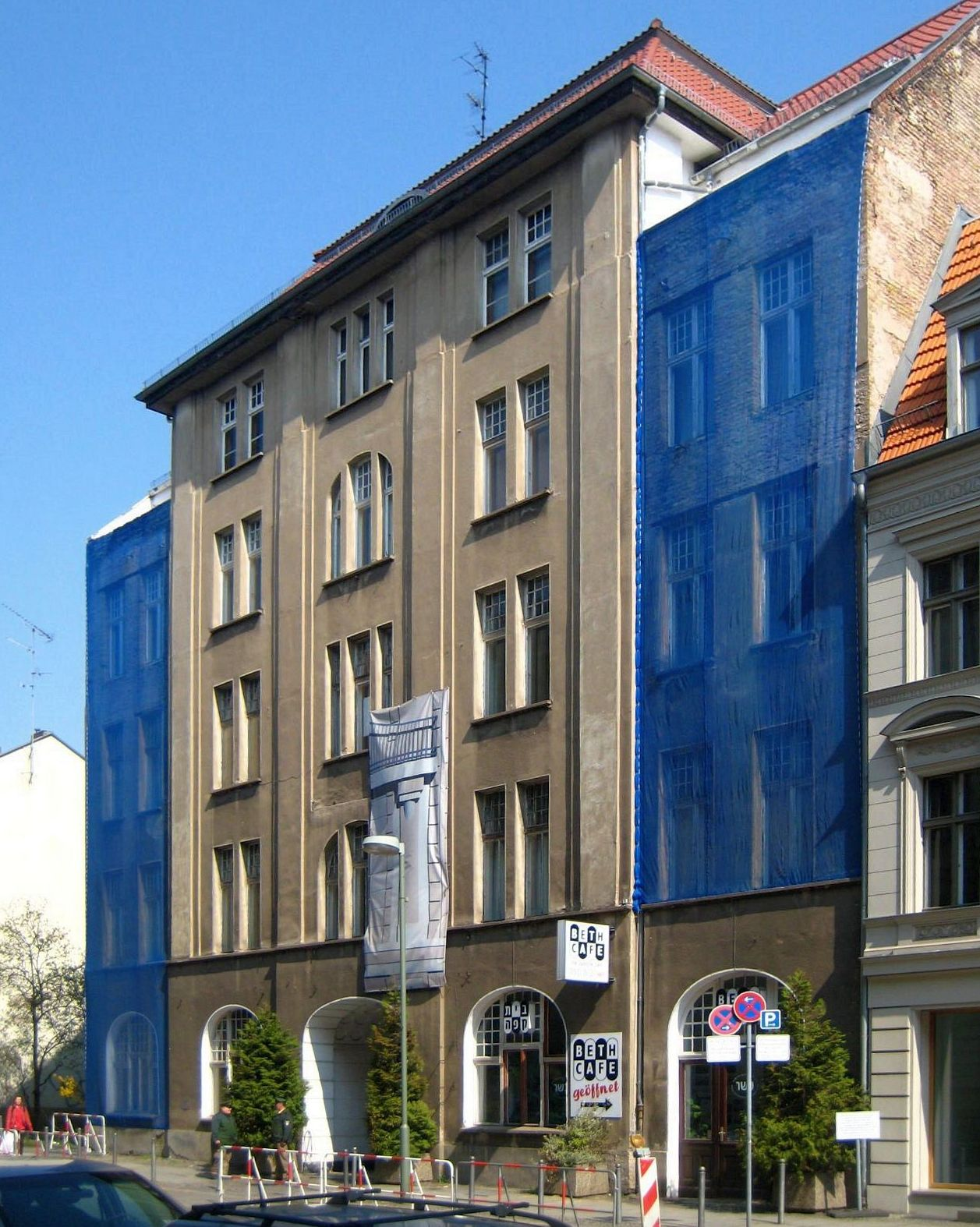
Modern view of the last location, now the community centre of Adass Jisroel

By this time, the attendance had greatly increased, and owing to the large number of pupils at the institution it became necessary to employ a new teacher; accordingly in 1895 Dr. J. Wohlgemuth, a former pupil, was appointed. After the death of the founder, Dr. Hildesheimer, on 12 June 1899, Rabbi David Z. Hoffmann was elected rector of the institution. During his rectorate the seminary, originally located on Gipsstraße 12a, moved into Adass Jisroel's new edifice on then Artilleriestraße 31–32 in 1904 (renamed and renumbered as Tucholskystraße 40 on 31 May 1951).

Hoffmann was succeeded by Rabbi Avrohom Eliyahu Kaplan, a graduate of the Slabodka yeshiva and a brilliant talmudist. Kaplan died young however after only four years as rector. He was succeeded by Rabbi Jechiel Jakob Weinberg, the last rector of the Seminary. The Seminary was closed by the Nazis in 1938.

=== Description ===
The seminary was divided into an upper and a lower division. Pupils in the lower division followed a two-year course, being promoted to the upper division on passing an examination; but pupils who had qualified in the principal branches were immediately admitted to the upper division. The course in this division lasted four years.

The conditions for admission to the seminary included the following: (1) the candidate had to prove by examination that he was able to understand a moderately difficult Talmudic text, Rashi and the Tosafot; (2) as regards the secular sciences he had either to have a certificate of graduation from a classical Gymnasium or to be able to show that he was fitted for the graduating class of such a Gymnasium.

At the end of the course, pupils who left the institution as qualified rabbis had passed special examinations showing that aside from their attainments in the various branches of Jewish learning they were sufficiently familiar with the ritual codices to decide correctly on ritual and religio-legal questions. See Yeshiva § Jewish law, Rabbi § Orthodox and Modern Orthodox Judaism and Halakha § Codes of Jewish law.

== Reestablishment ==
In 2009, the Seminary was reestablished with the blessing of Professor Dr. Meir Hildesheimer and Rabbi Azaria Hildesheimer, great grandsons of the founder, under the name Rabbinerseminar zu Berlin. The contemporary Seminary is funded by the Central Council of Jews in Germany and the Ronald S. Lauder Foundation, and occupies premises at the Skoblo Synagogue and Education Center in Berlin Mitte. Rector of the reestablished institution was Dayan Chanoch Ehrentreu, formerly the Rosh Beth Din of the London Beth Din. From 2020, Rav Moshe Mordechai Farbstein served as co-Rektor, and with the passing of Dayan Ehrentreu in 2022, became the only Rektor of the institution.

The Seminary first ordained Rabbis in 2009. Graduates serve as community rabbis and as educators in Freiburg im Breisgau, Köln, Leipzig, Osnabrück, Potsdam, Frankfurt am Main and Berlin.

The course of study is four years, and is divided into two major and one minor areas of study. The major areas are classical Talmud and Halacha, and a state accredited degree in social work offered by the University of Applied Sciences - Erfurt. The minor area includes professional qualifications such as pastoral care, bereavement counseling, and public speaking, as well as intellectual history and constitutional law.

In 2013, the Seminary established an affiliate institution in partnership with the Israelitische Religionsgemeinde zu Leipzig, the Institute for Traditional Liturgy, to train both rabbinical students and communal lay leaders to lead prayer services in accordance with halachic practice and normative ritual tradition; see Jewish liturgy and Nusach.

== Rectors ==
- 1873–1899 - Dr. Azriel Hildesheimer
- 1899–1920 - Dr. David Zvi Hoffmann
- 1920–1924 - Rabbi Avrohom Eliyahu Kaplan
- 1924–1938 - Dr. Yechiel Yaakov Weinberg
- 2009–2022 - Rabbi Chanoch Ehrentreu
- 2022–present - Rabbi Moshe Mordechai Farbstein

== Teachers ==
- Dr. Jacob Barth, Semitic philologist, lecturer for the Hebrew language, and namesake of Barth's law
- Dr. Abraham Berliner (1833–1915), lecturer for Jewish history and literature
- Dr. Solomon Cohn, lecturer for theoretic and practical homiletics
- Dr. Hirsch Hildesheimer, lecturer in Jewish history and geography of Palestine
- Dr. Joseph Wohlgemuth (1867–1942)

== Notable alumni ==
Among the Seminary's graduates were:

- Prof. Dr. Alexander Altmann (1906–1987), son of the Chief Rabbi of Trier, served as rabbi in Berlin and Manchester, England, founder of the Institute of Jewish Studies at University College London, and longtime professor at Brandeis University
- Dr. Eduard Baneth (1855–1930), lecturer at the Lehranstalt für die Wissenschaft des Judentums ("Institute for the Study of the Science of Judaism") at Berlin
- Dr. Eliezer Berkovits (1908–1992), rabbi, theologian and author
- Pinchas Biberfeld, (1915–1999), Chief Rabbi of Munich and rosh kollel of Zlatipol-Chortkov
- Haim-Moshe Shapira (1902–1970), signatory of Israel's declaration of independence, minister in 1948–1970
- Dr. Yosef Burg (1909–1999), Rabbi, Israeli politician, among others Israeli Minister of Health, Minister of Postal Services, Minister of Welfare, Minister of Internal Affairs, Minister without Portfolio and Minister of Religious Affairs.
- Dr. Joseph Zvi Carlebach (1883–1942), Chief Rabbi of Lübeck, Altona and Hamburg
- Josef Hirsch Dunner (1913–2007), Chief Rabbi of East Prussia, head of the Union of Orthodox Hebrew Congregations, European President of Agudath Israel
- Prof. Dr. Israel Friedlander (1876–1920), professor at the Jewish Theological Seminary of America in New York
- Dr. David Herzog, lecturer at the University of Prague
- Dr. Hirsch Hildesheimer, lecturer in Jewish history of the Seminary
- Prof. Dr. Hartwig Hirschfeld (1854–1934), lecturer for Judaeo-Arabic studies at the Jews' College, London, translator of the Kuzari into English
- Dr. David Zvi Hoffmann (1843–1921) Rector of the Seminary (successor of Hildesheimer)
- Dr. Jacob Horowitz, lecturer at the University of Berlin
- Dr. Leo Jung (1892–1987), rabbi and influential figure of American Orthodox Judaism
- Rabbi Philip Klein (1849–1926) rabbi in Libau and New York City
- Prof. Jacob Zallel Lauterbach Talmudic scholar and Reform rabbi.
- Prof. Dr. Alexander Marx (1878–1953), professor at the Jewish Theological Seminary of America in New York
- Rabbi Shlomo Wolbe (1914–2005), rabbi and mashgiach of Yeshivas Be'er Yaakov and Lakewood yeshiva in Israel.
- Rabbi Dr. David Ochs, Chief Rabbi of Leipzig, Tel Aviv, and founder of Israel's religious public schools. https://www.invaluable.com/auction-lot/holocaust-a-photograph-of-rabbi-david-ochs-the-ra-55-c-b0e4386bff
- Rabbi Menachem Mendel Schneerson, the last Lubavitcher Rebbe, was a student in the 1920s while he was living in Berlin, Germany.
- Dr. Elieser Berlinger (1904–1985), rabbi in Schönlanke (Germany), rabbi in Malmö (Sweden), chief rabbi of Helsinki (Finland), chief rabbi of Utrecht (Holland)
- Rabbi Dr. Arthur Cohn (Asher Michoel), rabbi of Basel, Switzerland from 1885–1926
