= Azriel Hildesheimer =

German Orthodox rabbi (1820–1899)

Rabbi Dr. Azriel Hildesheimer
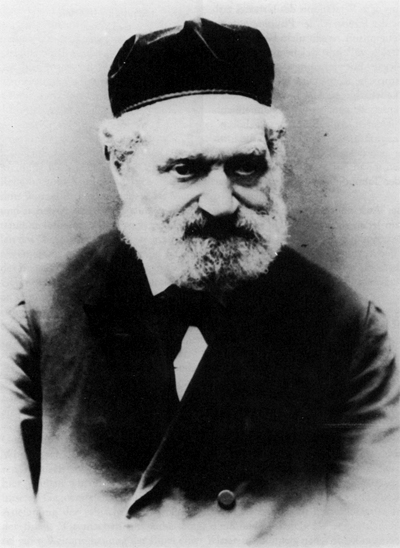
- Photograph of Azriel Hildesheimer
- Title: Rabbi, Educator, Modern Orthodox Leader

Personal life
- Born: Azriel Hildesheimer; 11 May 1820 Halberstadt, Province of Saxony, Kingdom of Prussia
- Died: 12 June 1899 (aged 79) Berlin, Germany
- Buried: Weißensee Cemetery, Berlin
- Spouse: Henrietta Hirsch
- Children: Hirsch Hildesheimer
- Parent: Rabbi Löb Glee Hildesheimer (father)
- Education: University of Halle-Wittenberg
- Occupation: Rabbi, Educator, Leader of Modern Orthodox Judaism

Religious life
- Religion: Judaism
- Denomination: Modern Orthodox Judaism

Jewish leader
- Successor: Rabbi David Zvi Hoffmann
- Position: Rabbi
- Synagogue: Adass Jisroel (Berlin)
- Yeshiva: Hildesheimer Rabbinical Seminary
- Organisation: Adass Jisroel, Hildesheimer Rabbinical Seminary
- Began: 1869
- Ended: 1899
- Other: Rabbi of Eisenstadt (1851–1869)
- Yahrtzeit: 12 June 1899
- Residence: Berlin, Germany
- Semikhah: Rabbi Jacob Ettlinger

Azriel Hildesheimer (also Esriel and Israel, Yiddish: עזריאל הילדעסהיימער; 11 May 1820 – 12 June 1899) was a German rabbi and leader of Orthodox Judaism. He is regarded as a pioneering moderniser of Orthodox Judaism in Germany and as a founder of Modern Orthodox Judaism.

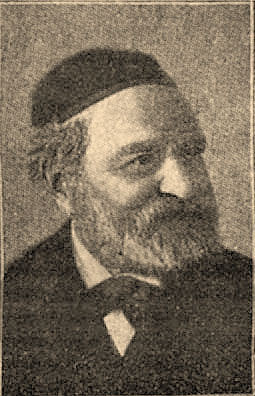
Headshot of Rav Hildesheimer

== Biography ==
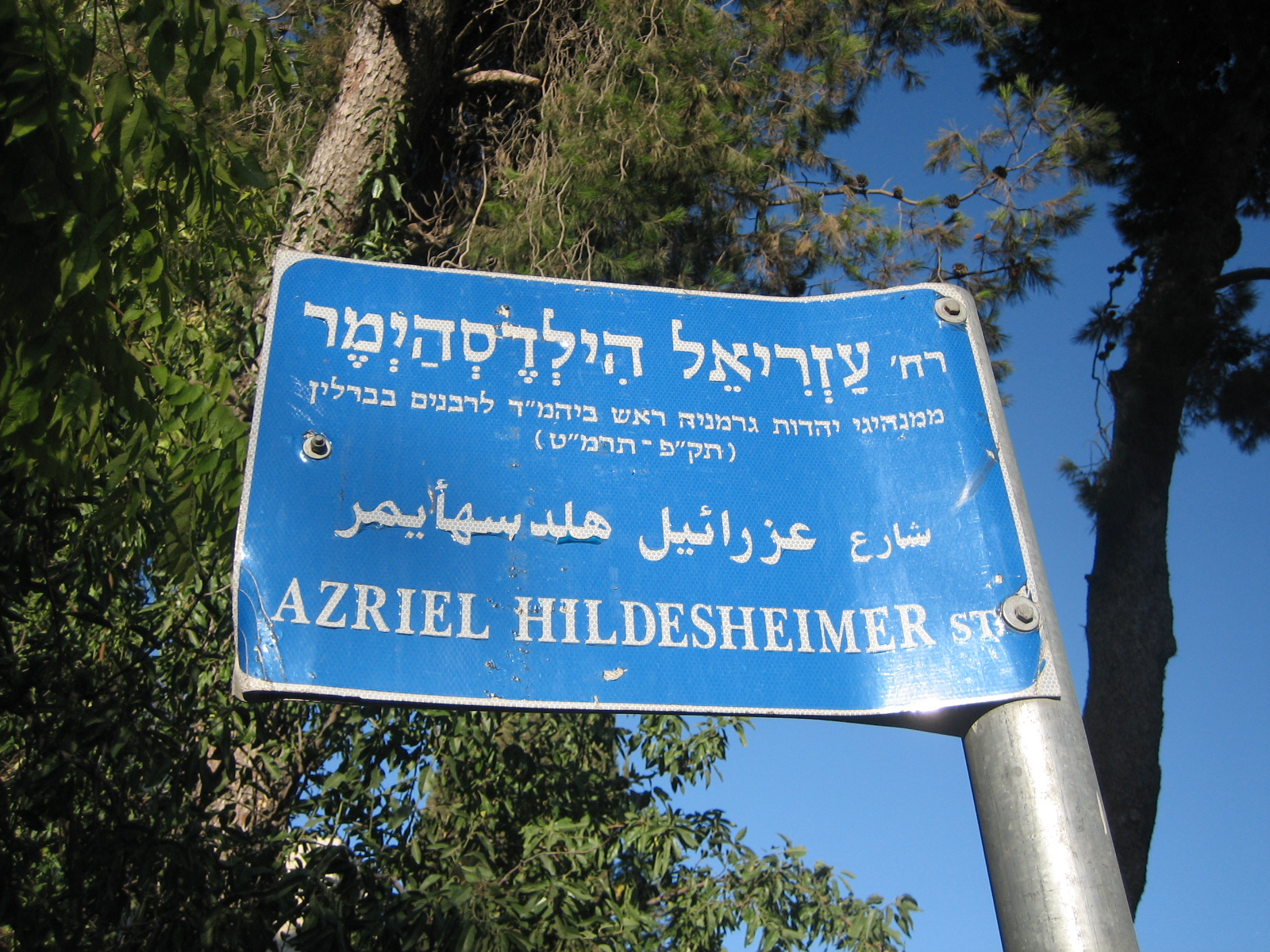
Street in Jerusalem named after Hildesheimer

Hildesheimer was born in Halberstadt, Province of Saxony, Kingdom of Prussia, the son of Rabbi Löb Glee Hildesheimer, a native of Hildesheim, Electorate of Hanover, a city near Hanover. He attended the Hasharat Zvi school in Halberstadt, and, from age seventeen, the yeshiva of Rabbi Jacob Ettlinger in Altona; chacham Isaac Bernays was one of his teachers and his model as a preacher. While studying in yeshiva Hildesheimer also studied classical languages. In 1840 he returned to Halberstadt, took his diploma at the public Königliches Dom-Gymnasium, and entered the University of Berlin; he became a disciple of the dominant Hegelian school. He studied Semitic languages and mathematics, and continued his study in Talmud. In 1842 he went to Halle upon Saale where he earned his doctorate from the University of Halle-Wittenberg in 1844 under Wilhelm Gesenius and Emil Rödiger (Ueber die rechte Art der Bibelinterpretation, English: On the Right Kind of Bible Interpretation). He then returned to Halberstadt, where he married Henrietta Hirsch, whose dowry made them financially independent.

In 1851 he became Rabbi of Eisenstadt (Kis Marton), Hungary (now located in Austria); the principal city of the Siebengemeinden or Sheva kehillot. His first notable act there was to found a parochial school, where correct German was used, and modern principles of pedagogy were adopted in teaching secular, as well as Jewish, subjects. Hildesheimer initially introduced limited secular studies in the elementary school; the older students received a secular education as well, but with a focus on mathematics and other subjects that would enhance their understanding of gemara.

Next, Hildesheimer established a yeshiva. The yeshiva was unusual in that it was the only Orthodox institution where students were required to have a significant secular education before they were admitted. Also, the curriculum devoted time to studying Tanach and the Hebrew language. Despite this approach, within a few years the Yeshiva attracted a large number of pupils. After beginning with six students in 1851, the seminary had 128 students in 1868, including one from the United States. His son, Hirsch Hildesheimer, was a professor there.

In 1869 the Orthodox minority in Berlin was granted government permission to found a separate Orthodox synagogal congregation, the Israelite Synagogue Congregation Adass Jisroel in Berlin (extant from 1869 to 1939, and again since 1989), then comprising about 200 families. They were dissatisfied with Rabbi Joseph Aub, appointed in 1867 by the Jüdische Gemeinde zu Berlin (till 1869 the only Jewish congregation in Berlin). Adass Jisroel chose Hildesheimer to represent them as an "Orthodox rabbi of standing". Here, he similarly established a religious school and a yeshiva (Rabbinerseminar für das orthodoxe Judenthum in Berlin 1873–1880, then the name was shortened to Rabbiner-Seminar zu Berlin, known as the Hildesheimer Rabbinical Seminary), which immediately attracted thirty former pupils. Hildesheimer was thus the real intellectual founder and leader of the Adass Jisroel congregation.

Aided by Meyer Lehmann, the editor of Israelit in Mainz (Mayence), Hildesheimer "exerted his whole energy" in the fight against Reform Judaism. In 1861 he took his stand against Abraham Geiger by criticising Geiger, Die Geiger'sche Broschüre Notwendigkeit und Maass einer Reform des jüdischen Gottesdienstes (under the name variant Israel Hildesheimer, Mayence: Verlag der Le Roux'schen Hofbuchhandlung, 1861). (In fact, as early as 1847—as the representative of the communities in the Magdeburg district—he had energetically opposed the Reform attempts of Ludwig Philippson.)

Hildesheimer was "simple in his habits and fearless"; he had an unusual capacity for work; and his great Talmudic learning "was joined to practical administrative ability". He was financially independent, and never accepted remuneration for his rabbinical activity. He was frequently engaged in philanthropic activities connected with his own congregation, but additionally, "no labor was too great and no journey too long for him" in the service of the Jews of Germany, Austria, Russia, and even Abyssinia and Persia, so that he came to be known as the "international schnorrer". Hildesheimer also took a special interest in the welfare of the Jews of Palestine. In 1860, when the missionary society of Palestine provided seventy free dwellings for homeless Jews, Hildesheimer himself built houses in Jerusalem for the free use of Jewish pilgrims and for the poor.

Hildesheimer died in Berlin on 12 July 1899. His grave is preserved in the Cemetery of the Synagogal Congregation of Adass Jisroel on Wittlicher Straße, Berlin-Weißensee.

In Israel, the moshav (settlement) Azri'el is named after him, as well as streets in Jerusalem and Tel Aviv.

=== Writings ===
Hildesheimer contributed articles to various journals and newspapers: the Jüdische Presse, Ha-Lebanon, He-Chalutz and Archives Israélites. During his lifetime he wrote his name in his books usually as Israel Hildesheimer. His son Hirsch was editor of the Jüdische Presse.

Other writings include:

- "Materialien zur Beurtheilung der Septuaginta", in: Literaturblatt des Orients, 1848, Nos. 30 et seq.;
- Die Epitaphien der Grabsteine auf dem Hiesigen [of Halberstadt] Jüdischen Friedhofe, 1846;
- Verwaltung der Jüdischen Gemeinde Halberstadt, Halberstadt: Dölle, 1849.
- Offener Brief an den Redacteur der Monatsschrift "Ben-Chananja", Leopold Löv, Vienna, 1858;
- ספר מנחה טהורה: כולל דינים מהלכות מליחה נדה חלה והדלקה / Minchah Tehorah, Solomon ben Moses Bonhard, Hildesheimer (ed.) Pressburg: 1860;
- Halachoth gedoloth: nach dem Texte der Handschrift der Vaticana /הלכות גדולות : על פי כתב יד רומי, with Simeon Ḳayara, Berlin: Itzkowski, 1888.
- Hukkat HaPesach

On the celebration of his seventieth birthday, in 1890, his friends and pupils published a literary Jubelschrift zum siebzigsten Geburtstag des Dr. Israel Hildesheimer, Rabbiner und Rector des Rabbiner-Seminars zu Berlin: Gewidmet von Freunden und Schülern / Hebrew: שי למורה: מאמרי תורה ודעת מחוברים לאות תודה ואהבה מובלים להרב עזריאל הילדעסהיימער... ביום מלאת לו שבעים שנה לימי חייו, יום כ״ז אייר שנת תר״ן (Berlin: H. Engel, 1890).

== Modernisation within Orthodoxy ==
Hildesheimer is regarded as a pioneering "Moderniser" of Orthodox Judaism in Germany. He was insistent that for Orthodox Jews living in the Western world, there was no possibility to segregate oneself behind ghetto walls. On the contrary, he felt that modern Jewish education must teach Jews how best to confront and deal with modernity in all of its aspects .

His firm conviction that traditional Judaism need have no fear of the light of European culture determined his attitude and his activity in Hungary and Germany from the start, and gave him a definite aim. In an address delivered at his rabbinical seminary and defining his position he said:

Unconditional agreement with the culture of the present day; harmony between Judaism and science; but also unconditional steadfastness in the faith and traditions of Judaism: these constitute the program of the New Community, the standard round which gather the Israelites of Berlin who are faithful to the Law.

He thus undertook a variety of actions which render him a "modern" activist and institution-builder. The most important of these, as discussed above, are:

1. Jewish education for males and females which included both religious and secular studies.
2. The seminary which incorporated not only secular studies but academic scholarship.
3. Maintaining traditional Jewish attachments to the Land of Israel and working with the non-Orthodox on its behalf.
4. Working with communal leaders, even non-Orthodox ones, on issues that affected the community, such as anti-Semitism and ritual slaughtering.

=== Orthodox opposition ===
The introduction into the Eisenstadt School of modern methods of education and of secular learning was resented by the Orthodox. Hildesheimer's "liberal tendencies and sympathy with modern culture" soon changed this resentment "to positive antipathy". Eventually his Yeshiva was denounced before the representatives of the government at Oedenburg, the result being that the Hungarian government ordered the school closed within twenty-four hours and the pupils removed from the city. Soon afterward (in 1858), however, Hildesheimer succeeded in obtaining state recognition for the Yeshiva. Interestingly, the Yeshiva also had opponents on the left: Reform saw it as a threat because its graduates would be equipped to defend Orthodoxy against Reform's inroads. In 1860, the “zealot” Akiva Yosef Schlesinger placed Hildesheimer under a ban as "not truly a sincere Jew" ("emessdiger Jüd"). Hildesheimer, however, seems to have cared little for the ban.

At the Hungarian Jewish Congress of 14 December 1868, Hildesheimer at first endeavored to associate himself with the existing Orthodox party. When the impossibility of this union became evident, he formed a separate group, with thirty-five followers, which has been described as "Cultured Orthodox". In the Hungarian Jewish Congress held at Budapest in 1869 he defined this party as representing a "faithful adherence to traditional teachings combined with an effective effort to keep in touch with the spirit of progress".

== See also ==
- Modern Orthodox Judaism
- Samson Raphael Hirsch
- Torah im Derech Eretz
- Torah Umadda
