= David Zvi Hoffmann =

German rabbi and scholar (1843–1921)

Rabbi David Zvi Hoffmann
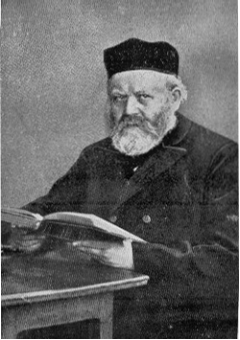
- Rabbi David Zvi Hoffmann
- Title: Rector

Personal life
- Born: November 24, 1843 Verbó, Austrian Empire
- Died: November 20, 1921 (aged 77) Berlin
- Notable work(s): Die wichtigsten Instanzen gegen die Graf-Wellhausensche Hypothese, Melamed Le-ho'il, Commentary on the Pentateuch
- Education: University of Tübingen
- Known for: Opposition to the Documentary Hypothesis, Commentary on the Pentateuch
- Occupation: Rabbi, Torah Scholar

Religious life
- Religion: Judaism
- Denomination: Orthodox

Jewish leader
- Post: Rector of the Rabbinical Seminary of Berlin (1899–1921)

David Zvi Hoffmann (November 24, 1843, Verbó, Austrian Empire – November 20, 1921, Berlin) (Hebrew: דוד צבי הופמן), was an Orthodox Rabbi and Torah scholar. He headed the Yeshiva in Berlin, wrote on tannaitic literature and the Mishnah, and produced commentaries on the Pentateuch that responded to contemporary biblical criticism. He is referred to as רד"צ הופמן - Radatz Hoffmann - in later Rabbinic writing.

He was an expert in Midrash halakha and the foremost halakhic authority in Germany in his generation.

He is well known for his strident literary opposition to the Graf-Wellhausen theories of Biblical origin, while he quotes prominent Wissenschaft figures in his researches on Mishnah and Talmud.

His commentary on the Pentateuch is still often referred to.

== Education and career ==
Born in Verbó in 1843, he attended various Yeshivas in his native town before he entered the college at Pressburg, from which he graduated in 1865. He then studied philosophy, history, and Oriental languages at Vienna and Berlin, taking his doctor's degree in 1871 from the University of Tübingen. His rabbinical training was under Moshe Schick and Azriel Hildesheimer.

Shortly after obtaining his degree, he became employed as a teacher in Samson Raphael Hirsch's Realschule school in Frankfurt am Main, and in 1873 moved to Berlin to join the faculty of the Rabbinical Seminary of Berlin where he eventually became rector (Rosh Yeshiva) in 1899 after the death of Azriel Hildesheimer.

== A selective Wissenschaft practitioner ==
David Hoffmann is in some ways the prototype of the contemporary Orthodox Jewish scholar, facing the ubiquitous tension between faithfulness to tradition and the demands of critical inquiry. Though born in Hungary, he adapted the German-Jewish approach of openness towards general culture, world and society.

He employed the critical scientific method to the Talmud and wrote about the history of the development of the form of the Oral law (as opposed to the development of the Law itself, the latter being an enterprise antithetical to traditional Jewish beliefs; see below). Despite this, he was an original member of the more traditionally oriented Moetzes Gedolei HaTorah (council of great Torah sages), and was also known to be "of great moral conduct and piety".

Hoffman was the leading authority on traditional halakha (Jewish law) in Germany in his lifetime, as well as an expert in the area of midrash halakha (legalistic Biblical exegesis). He was also known for his efforts to disprove the Documentary Hypothesis, as expressed by the Graf-Wellhausen theory, with his arguments presented in the work Die wichtigsten Instanzen gegen die Graf-Wellhausensche Hypothese (1903/1916).

A. Altmann, however, sees Hoffmann's writings on these matters (though evidencing great expertise) as pure apologetics, the cause of which may be seen as laid out in his introduction to Leviticus (Ellenson & Jacobs 1988), where Hoffmann makes the following remarks:

I willingly agree that, in consequence of the foundation of my belief, I am unable to arrive at the conclusion that the Pentateuch was written by anyone other than Moses...

We believe that the whole Bible is true, holy, and of divine origin. That every word of the Torah was inscribed by divine command is expressed in the principle Torah min Ha Shamayim... We must not presume to set ourselves up as critics of the author of a biblical text or doubt the truth of his statements or question the correctness of his teaching...

The Jewish commentator must (therefore) constantly be on guard against interpreting the passage in such a way as to appear to be in conflict with traditional Halachah. Just as the Torah as a divine revelation must not contradict itself, in the same way it must not contradict the Oral Law which is of divine origin.

Yet, despite the piety of the above sentiments, and his repeated proclamations regarding the divinity of the Oral Law, Hoffmann was still very much the Wissenschaft scholar. He cites in his work scholars such as Z. Frankel, A. Geiger, S.J. Rapoport, and H. Graetz, he studies the influences of Ancient Near Eastern culture on the evolution of the Talmud, and he identifies problems in the transmitted text. For example, Hoffmann in The First Mishna (discussed below) sees the present Mishna Avot as having been redacted from three different sources, a Mishna of Rabbi Akiva, a Mishna of Rabbi Meir, and a Mishna of Rabbi Judah Ha-Nasi, the originals of which cannot be completely reconstructed due to their thoroughgoing fusion and subsequent manipulation.

The extent to which Hoffmann resided in the Wissenschaft movement can also be seen from the criticism he received from such opponents of the movement as Samson Raphael Hirsch. Hildesheimer notes regarding Hirsch's opinion of his Rabbinical Seminary (where Hoffmann worked after leaving Hirsch's institution) that "a question certainly exists as to whether Rabbi Hirsch considers the seminary to be an Orthodox institution." Hirsch's opposition extended to Hoffmann's own work, judging Hoffmann's book Mar Samuel to contain heresies (Ellenson & Jacobs 1988).

Hoffmann's resolution of this tension between faithfulness to tradition and textual criticism is found by Ellenson & Jacobs (1988) in the following passage from the introduction to The First Mishna:

Thus, in the study of the Holy Scriptures on the one hand, we consider the authenticity and integrity to be absolute, and we can recognize as true only such results as do not question that premise. With the Mishna, on the other hand, any criticism (unless it contradicts a halachah fixed in the Talmud) as well as any research as to the age of the Mishna and the time of its expression in the extant form is not only considered permissible to us, but even required for the scientific examination of the tradition.

== Writings ==
Hoffman produced the Die Erste Mishna (The First Mishna), mentioned above, a historical and linguistic analysis of the Mishnah. Die Erste Mishna posits an early, uniform, undisputed, and therefore authoritative collection of the Oral Law, attempting to understand the historical development of the Mishnah from within itself and from rabbinic and non-rabbinic sources related to it. In this and the below work, Hoffmann draws on his expertise in midrash halakha and Semitic languages. For further context, see Oral Torah § In rabbinic literature and commentary.

His commentary on the Pentateuch that included a translation of the text into German, is still widely cited. In it, he addresses erstwhile biblical criticism, particularly questions of God's names and of the Torah's antiquity. The work began as a series of lectures which he gave in the Rabbinical Seminary. Originally, commentaries on Genesis, Leviticus, and Deuteronomy were published, starting in 1904; his commentary on Exodus was published by Mossad Harav Kook only in 2010. The commentaries on Leviticus and Deuteronomy were written by Radatz himself, while the commentaries on Genesis and Exodus were written by his students, based on manuscripts of his lectures.

Hoffmann's Melamed Le-ho'il, are responsa on then contemporary issues, as based on historical evidence of tradition. He also published a translation of two of the orders of the Mishna into German.

Most of his writings were in German and remain so to this day. The First Mishna was translated into English, and a selection of his comments on the Passover Haggada have been published in Hebrew as well. His Pentateuch commentary was later translated into Hebrew; though today some volumes are out of print. Sefer Shemos has been recently reprinted; other volumes are available online.
