= Invalidity of gentile courts =

Invalidity of gentile courts (he:ערכאות של גויים) is a Talmudic rule regarding gentile courts in Judaism. The rule states that gentile courts are invalid for ruling over Jews.

Jewish law requires disputes to be settled by a Jewish court (beth din) under the laws of the Torah. It is forbidden to settle disputes in a court ruled by gentile laws. Jewish law permits settling disputes in gentile courts in exceptional cases and these cases usually require approval from Jewish religious authority.

There is ongoing halachic dispute regarding the status of the courts in modern state of Israel and whether the courts are religiously binding.

== Source of the ban ==
The prohibition comes from the tractate Gittin of the Babylonian Talmud which states:

"Rabbi tarpon says: Wherever you find courts of gentiles, even though the rulings by Israel's policies, you may not resort to them, as it is written ( Exodus) these are the ordinances which you shall put before them, before them and not before the Gentiles."

The punishment for breaking this rule is herem or excommunication. This rule was instated so that Jews would not be subjected to the courts of the gentile nations which were idolatrous.

== Exceptions ==
If a Jew is robbed or cheated by a gentile and the only option to get the money back is to be present in the gentile courts the Jew is allowed to settle the dispute in the court.

== In modern Israel ==
The courts in modern-day nation of Israel do not rule according to the laws of the Torah. However most of the judges are Jews with sufficient knowledge in Judaism. Some Jewish scholars believe that in the absence of religious courts these courts can be binding. However the majority believe that since these courts do not rule according to the Torah, they are not religiously binding.

== See also ==
- Lex loci
- Dina d'malkhuta dina
