= Sofer (surname) =

Sofer and variants are Jewish occupational surnames derived from the occupation of sofer, is a ritual scribe in Judaism. Notable people with the surname Sofer, Sofaer, Sopher include:

- Aaron Sopher (1905–1972), American painter
- Abraham Sofaer (1896–1988), British actor
- Abraham David Sofaer (born 1938), American judge
- Anna Sofaer (born 1940), American archaeologist
- Anne Sofer (born 1937), British politician
- Ariela Sofer, Israeli and American operations researcher
- Avraham Shmuel Binyamin Sofer (1815–1871), Hungarian rabbi
- Chaim Sofer (1821–1886), Hungarian rabbi and scholar
- Dalia Sofer (born 1972), Iranian-born American writer
- Daniel Sofer (born 1988), Israeli footballer
- David Sopher (1929–2019), Indian water polo player
- Eva Sopher (1923–2018), Brazilian theatre manager
- Gregg N. Sofer, American lawyer
- Jekuthiel Sofer, 18th century Dutch Sephardic scribe
- Joanna Sofaer (born 1970), British archaeologist and professor
- Mark Sofer (born 1954), Israeli diplomat
- Moses Sofer (1762–1839), Orthodox rabbi
- Moshe Sofer (II) (1885–1944), Hungarian rabbi
- Ofir Sofer (born 1975), Israeli politician
- Opal Sofer (born 1997), Israeli footballer
- Rena Sofer (born 1968), American actress
- Sam Sofer (born 1945), Iranian-born American scientist
- Shimon Sofer (Hungarian rabbi) (1850–1944), Hungarian rabbi
- Shimon Sofer (1820–1883), Austrian rabbi
- Shoval Sofer (born 1998), Israeli acrobatic gymnast
- Solomon Sopher, Baghdadi Jewish leader
- Yaakov Chaim Sofer (1870–1939), Sephardic rabbi, kabbalist, talmudist and poseq
- Yehoshua Sofer (born 1958), Israeli-Jamaican hip hop and martial artist
- Yochanan Sofer (1923–2016), Hungarian-born Israeli rabbi
- Yozef Yozpa Sofer (1819–1883), Jewish merchant

== Fictional characters ==
- Rube John Sofer, in the American TV series Dead Like Me

== See also ==
- Sofer of Prague (Abraham Niederländer), 16th-century Jewish-Austrian mathematician
- Soifer
