= Erlau (Hasidic dynasty) =

Hungarian Hasidic dynasty

Erlau Hasidic Dynasty
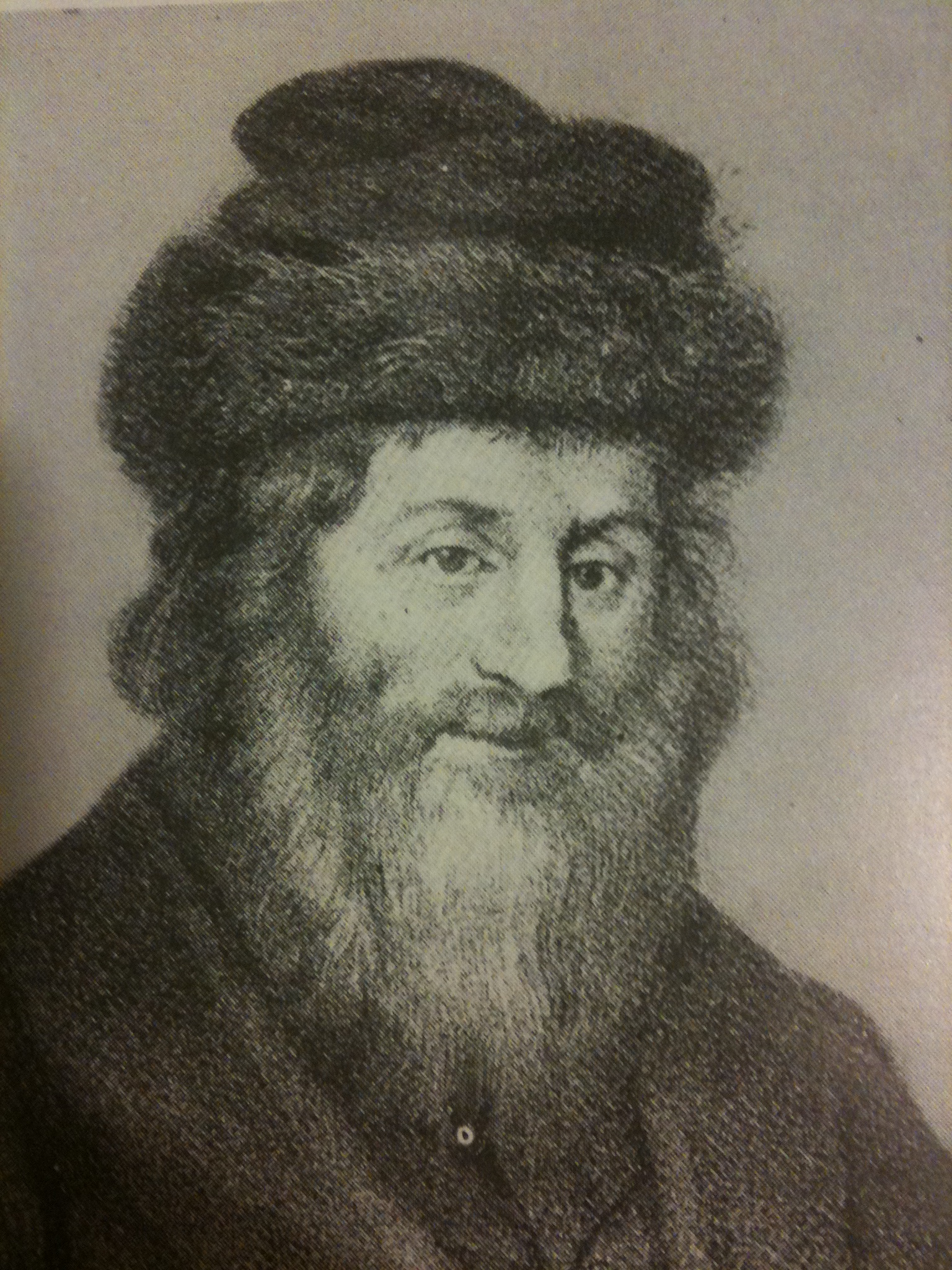
- Rabbi Moshe Sofer, the Chasam Sofer

Total population
- over 500 families

Founder
- Rabbi Yochanan Sofer

Regions with significant populations
- Israel, United States, United Kingdom, Belgium

Religions
- Hasidic Judaism

Languages
- Yiddish, Hebrew

Erlau (Hebrew: ערלוי, also spelled Erloi), is a Haredi dynasty of Hungarian origin, which follows the teachings of the Chasam Sofer and is often considered Hasidic.

The Erlau community was established by Rabbi Yochanan Sofer in Jerusalem after World War II to continue the legacy of his grandfather, Rabbi Shimon Sofer, who was Chief Rabbi of Erlau and rosh yeshiva of the Yeshivas Chasam Sofer there. This community uniquely follows Ashkenazic tradition blended with Hasidic customs.

== Name ==
Erlau (dt.) (also spelled Erloy and Erloi) is the Yiddish and German name of the Hungarian city Eger, which is situated between Miskolc and Pest, Hungary. During the early Middle Ages, the town was named Erlau by the German, Avar, and Slavonic tribes living there. This name was adapted to Yiddish and was used by the Jewish population there until World War II.

== History ==
=== Rabbi Moshe Sofer – Chasam Sofer ===
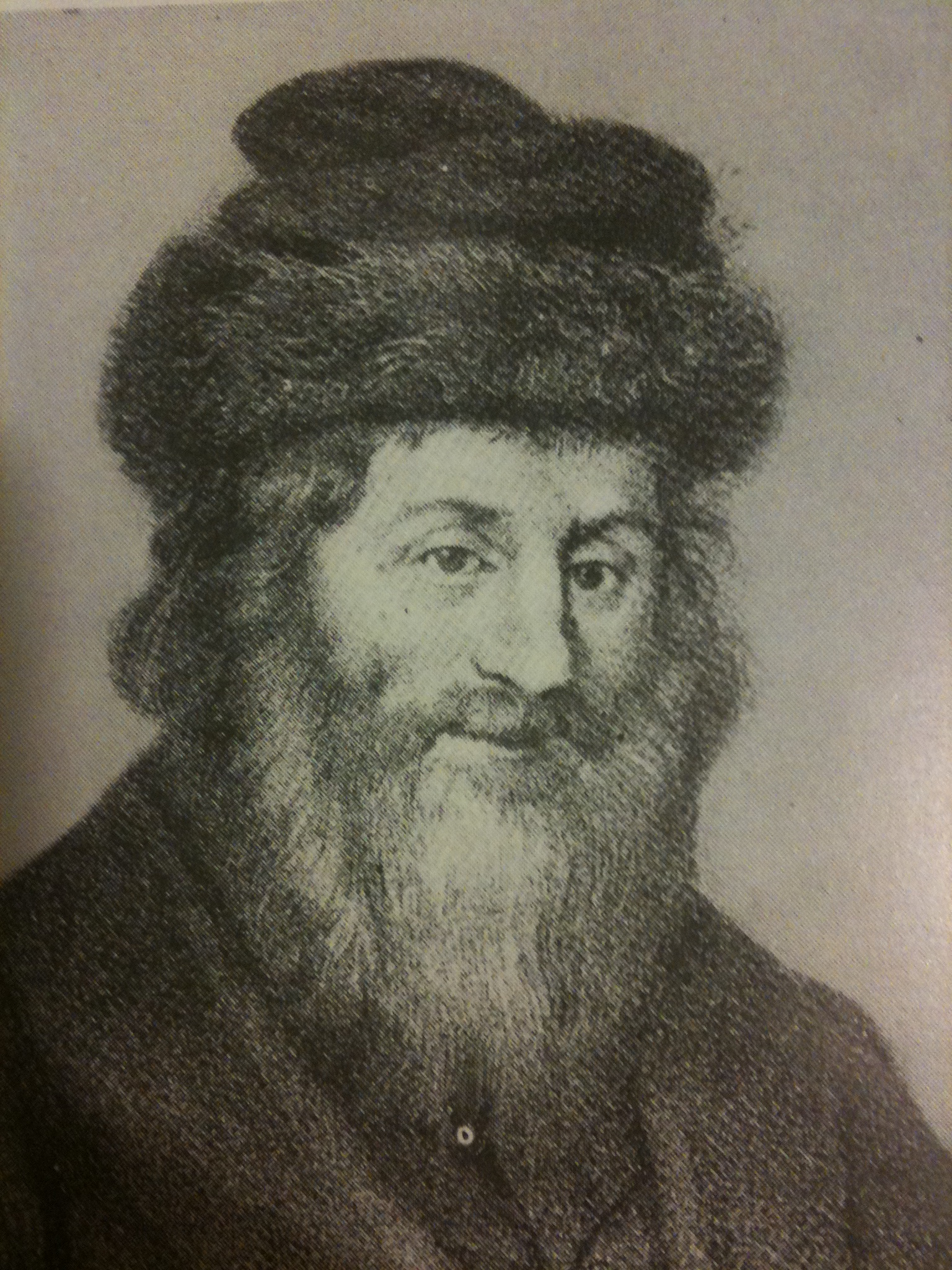
Rabbi Moshe Sofer

Rabbi Moshe Sofer, (German: Moses Schreiber), (1762–1839) and his teachings are the cornerstone and foundation of the Erlau dynasty, whose leaders were genealogically descended from him.

Moshe Sofer was a descendant of the Yalkut Shimoni and the son-in-law of the famous Talmudist Rabbi Akiva Eger (1761–1837). He was a disciple of the kabbalist, Rabbi Nathan Adler (1741–1800), and of talmudist Rabbi Pinchas Horowitz (circa 1731–1805). A talmudist and posek of his own right, Moshe Sofer became an undisputed halakhic authority and one of the leading Orthodox rabbis in the first half of the nineteenth century.

He established a yeshiva in Pressburg which became the most influential yeshiva in Central Europe. This Yeshiva was considered the largest since the time of the Babylonian Talmud and produced hundreds of future leaders of Orthodox Jewry. He became known by the name of the Sefarim he authored; Chasam Sofer ("Seal of the Scribe" and acronym for Chidushei Toras Moshe Sofer),

Moshe Sofer's students continued his legacy, spreading throughout Europe and the Land of Israel (then Ottoman Palestine) teaching his approach to Torah whilst maintaining an uncompromising opposition to most though not all forms of acculturation, religious reform or any breach in tradition. The yeshiva in Pressburg was the forerunner of many yeshivas, such as Rabbi Moshe Schick's 800-student yeshiva in Khust.

=== Rabbi Avraham Shmuel Binyomin Sofer – Ksav Sofer ===
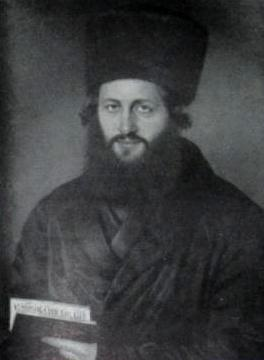
Rabbi Avrohom Shmuel Binyamin Sofer

Rabbi Avraham Shmuel Binyamin Sofer (German: Wolf Schreiber), (1815–1871) succeeded his father, Moshe Sofer, as Chief Rabbi of Pressburg and rosh yeshiva.

Avraham Shmuel Binyamin Sofer was the son-in-law of the tzadik, Rabbi Yitzchok Weiss of Görlitz. After his marriage in 1833, he became actively involved in running of the yeshiva. Together with his younger brother, Rabbi Shimon Sofer, he started editing and publishing their father's Torah commentary.

At the age of 25, upon the death of his father in 1839, he was appointed as chief rabbi Of Pressburg and Rosh Yeshiva of the already famous Pressburg Yeshiva. He led the Pressburg community for some 33 years and became renowned as a brilliant Torah commentator and halakhist. His works are known as Ksav Sofer ("Writing of the Scribe"),

Of his 10 children, Rabbi Simcha Bunim Sofer (author of Shevet Sofer), succeeded him as rabbi of Pressburg and rosh yeshiva after his death in 1871. Another son, Rabbi Shimon Sofer, founded a yeshiva in the Hungarian town of Eger (Erlau) continuing the heritage of his father and grandfather.

The yeshiva continued to function in Pressburg until World War II, and was reopened in Jerusalem, Israel by Rabbi Akiva Sofer (the Daas Sofer) in 1950.

=== Rabbi Shimon Sofer - Hisorerus Tshuva ===
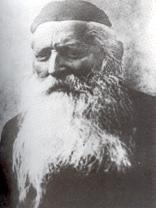
Rabbi Shimon Sofer

Rabbi Shimon Sofer (1850–1944) was the progenitor of the Erlau dynasty. He was the son of Shmuel Binyamin Sofer (Ksav Sofer) and grandson of Moses Sofer (the Chasam Sofer).

After spending time in Uman and Kiev, Shimon Sofer spent two years (circa 1873) in Kraków in the company of his uncle, Rabbi Shimon Sofer (1820–1883), author of the Michtav Sofer. From there he returned to his birthplace, Pressburg.

In 1881, he was appointed chief rabbi of Eger (Erlau). There he founded a large yeshiva, naming it Yeshivas Chasam Sofer. This yeshiva which was attended by elite Torah scholars from throughout Hungary, remained true to the philosophy and teachings of the Chasam Sofer and the Ksav Sofer.

Shimon Sofer spent most of his life editing and publishing the works of the Chasam Sofer and Ksav Sofer. The Michtav Sofer encouraged many to turn over handwritten manuscripts of the Chasam Sofer to Shimon Sofer for publishing. He also authored his own sefarim; Musrei Harambam, Shir Maon and Hisorerus Tshuva. Hence he is known to many simply as "the Hisorerus Tshuva".

In all, Shimon Sofer led the Jewish community in Erlau for some 64 years. His official title was av beit din, and he was referred to by his community as Rebbe.

=== Rabbi Moshe Sofer – Yad Sofer ===
Rabbi Moshe Sofer (1885–1944), author of Yad Sofer ("Hand of the Scribe"), was dayan (rabbinic judge) of the Beth Din in Erlau. As his father aged, he became the active rav and supervised the cheder and yeshiva

Moshe Sofer edited and published the works of the Chasam Sofer, Ksav Sofer and Sofer Mahir (authored by Rabbi Yitzchak Leib Sofer of Drohobych, son of Ksav Sofer) and authored many of his own works on the Torah, most of which were lost during the war.

Remaining today is his responsa on the Shulchan Aruch which he named Yad Sofer (Hand of the Scribe). This responsa was published by his son, Rabbi Yochanan Sofer, who added his own commentary and notations named Itur Sofrim (Ornament of the Scribes). These sefarim were printed in 1949 in Budapest at Gewirtz Brothers Printery.

The Erlau Jewish community was deported to Auschwitz by the Nazis in 1944. On 12 June 1944 (21 Sivan 5704), at the age of 94, Shimon Sofer was murdered by the Nazis together with his son, Moshe Sofer, and many others from the city of Erlau. Some of Shimon Sofer's other children survived the Holocaust. Moshe Sofer's wife and four daughters were murdered by the Nazis, but he was survived by his sons, Avraham Shmuel Binyamin and Yochanan.

==== Rabbi Avraham Shmuel Binyamin Sofer (II) – Divrei Sofer ====
Rabbi Avraham Shmuel Binyamin (son of Rabbi Moshe Sofer (II)) was a Torah genius who received semicha (rabbinic ordination) from Rabbi Chaim Mordechai Roller (Be'er Chaim Mordechai) of Piatra Neamţ, Romania. Due to his humility, he refused an offer to head the renewed Yeshivas Chasam Sofer in Pest or to assume the mantle of leadership of the remaining Erlau community, most of which found refuge there. He bequeathed this task to his younger brother, Yochanan.

Thereafter, they returned to Erlau where Yochanan was appointed rabbi and was married. Avraham Shmuel Binyamin Sofer took an active role in the re-founding of the community and yeshiva together with his brother Yochanan, supporting this endeavor with personal savings from the business he established. He spent his spare time at the yeshiva engaged in Torah study with the students. He was known as a philanthropist and aided Jewish war refugees. Never married, he died in 1948 and was buried in the Jewish cemetery in Erlau. His legacy remains in his handwritten Torah works, Divrei Sofer, later published by his brother Yochanan and printed by the Institute for Research of the Teachings of the Chasam Sofer (Hebrew: מכון חת"ם סופר).

=== Rabbi Yochanan Sofer – Imrei Sofer ===
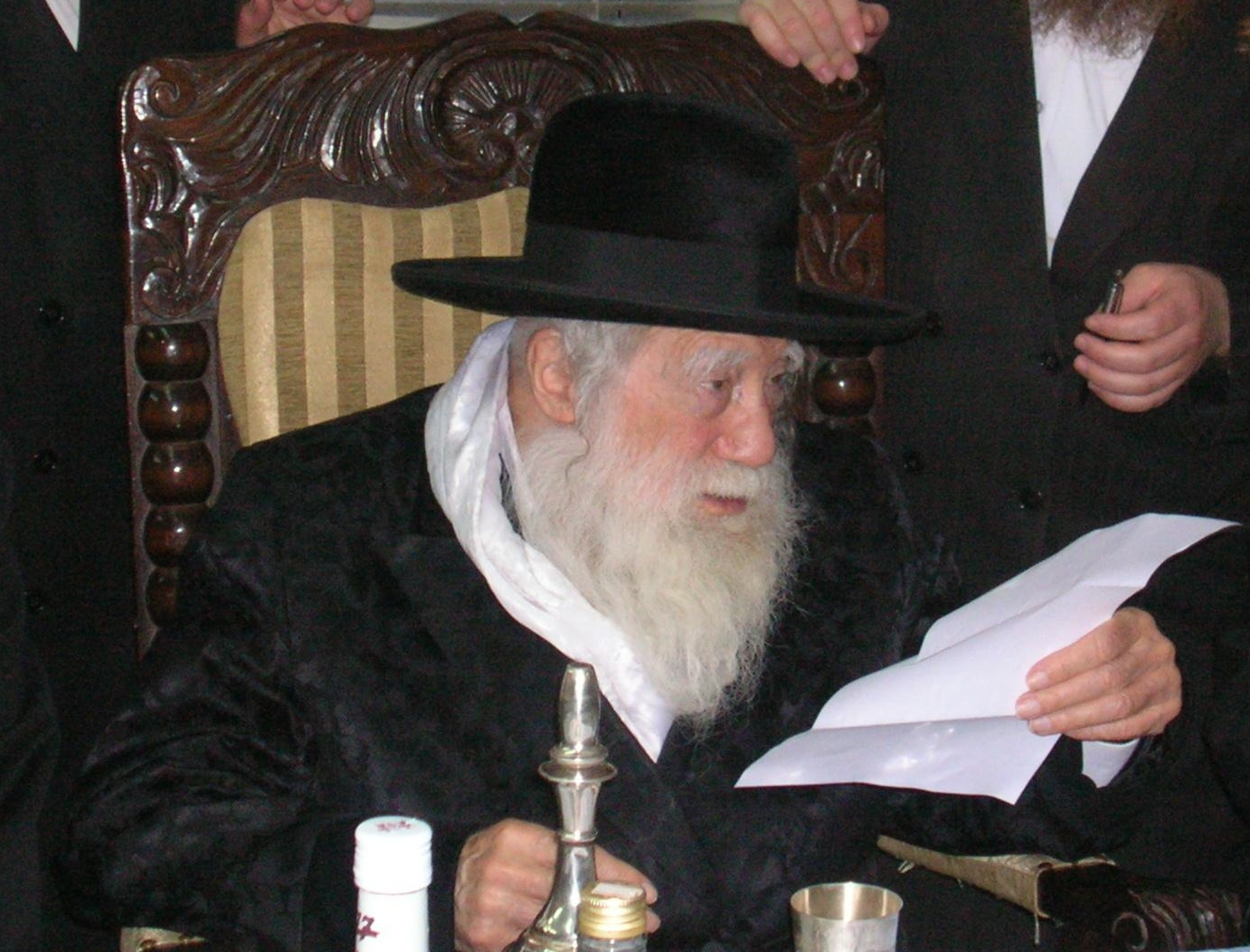
Rabbi Yochanan Sofer

Rabbi Yochanan Sofer was born to Rabbi Moshe Sofer (Yad Sofer) in Erlau in 1923. He was raised by his father and grandfather, from whom he received his rabbinical education. He also studied at the Verpleleter Yeshiva in Verpelét, Hungary, whose rosh yeshiva was Rabbi Yosef Usher Pollack (1888–1944), (author of Shearis Yosef Usher).

Yochanan Sofer survived Auschwitz and returned to Pest after the war to rebuild the Jewish community and Yeshiva. There he reinstated the Yeshivas Chasam Sofer together with Rabbi Moshe Stern of Debrecen.

In 1947, he re-established the yeshiva in Erlau, with a small group of boys and adolescents (mostly orphans). He married and was appointed rabbi of the fledgling Orthodox Jewish community there.

Yochanan Sofer authored many Torah works. His main work is a commentary on the Talmud entitled Imrei Sofer (Proverbs of the Scribe). He was one of the main leaders of the Ashkenazi Orthodox Jewish community in Israel and was one of five senior members presiding over the Moetzes Gedolei HaTorah of Agudath Israel.

He died in 2016.

== Move to Jerusalem ==
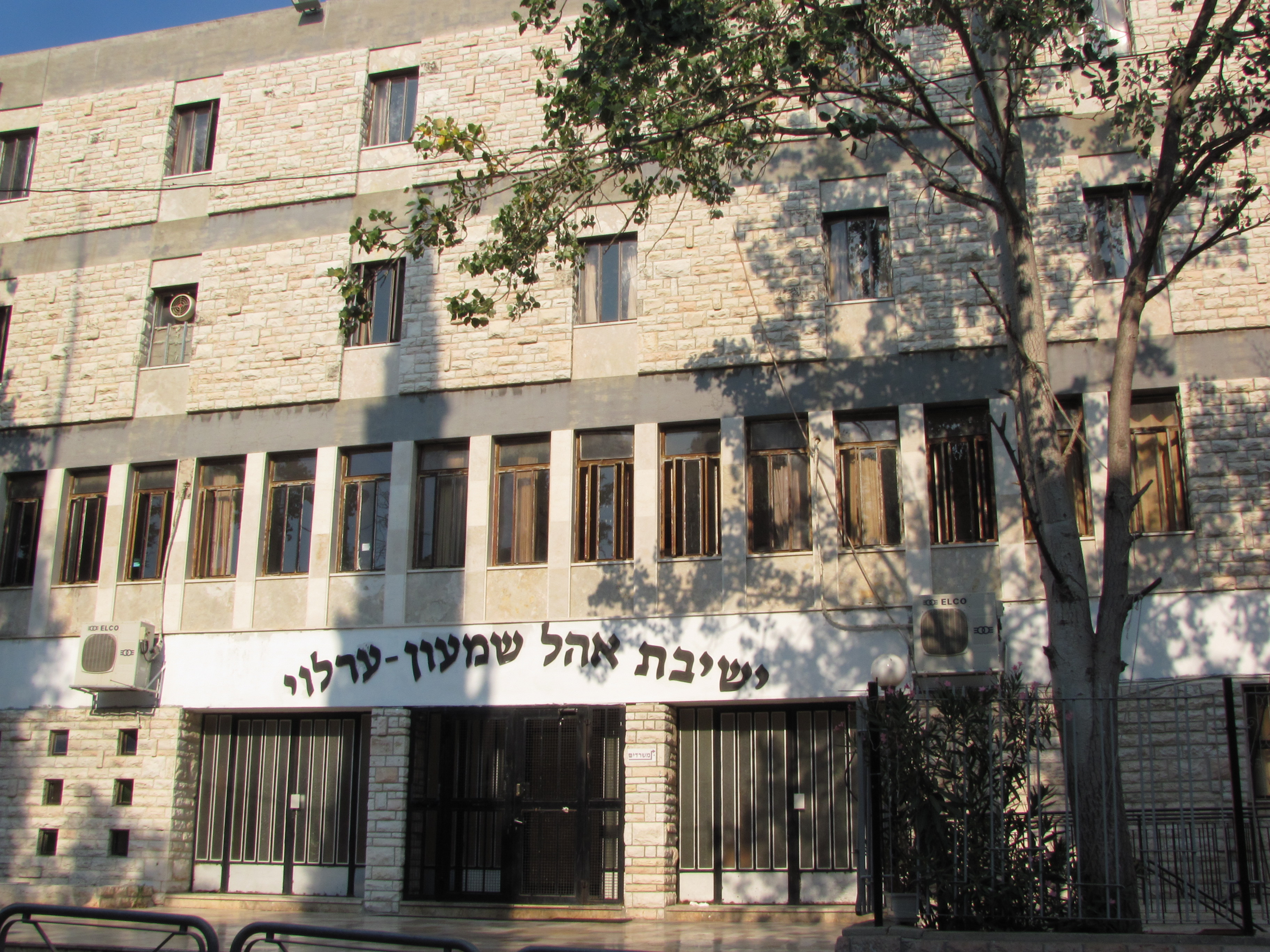
Ohel-Shimon Erlau campus in Katamon, Jerusalem.

Due to the Communist grip on Hungary and oppression of Judaism there, Sofer immigrated to Israel together with his yeshiva in 1950. For a short period of time, the yeshiva merged with the Pressburg Yeshiva in Jerusalem, which was headed by Akiva Sofer (Daas Sofer), a great-grandson of the Chasam Sofer. Yochanan Sofer served there as a maggid shiur.

During this time, Yochanan Sofer became a close disciple of Rabbi Aharon Rokeach, the Belzer Rebbe. From him, Sofer acquired extensive knowledge of Hasidut, which eventually led him to adopt and preach numerous Hasidic customs.

In 1953 he founded the Erlau yeshiva and community in the Katamon neighbourhood of south-central Jerusalem, starting with the purchase of a few rooms in the building of the former Syrian Consulate on Yotam Street. The yeshiva was named "High Yeshiva of Rabbi Akiva Eiger" after the father-in-law of the Chasam Sofer. Later this yeshiva expanded to the whole building, where Sofer founded a dormitory and orphanage for Holocaust survivors and students from needy families.

In 1961, Sofer constructed a new building in the empty lot adjacent to the yeshiva. It was named Ohel Shimon-Erlau after his grandfather, Shimon Sofer. This new campus includes a beth midrash which serves until today as the main synagogue and study hall for the yeshiva gedola, a smaller study hall for the yeshiva ketana, dormitory, classrooms, library, kitchen, offices and the Rebbe's sanctuary. In addition, he opened the Institute for Research of the Teachings of the Chasam Sofer. This institute researches and deciphers handwritten documents of the Chasam Sofer, his pupils and descendants. It has brought to light and printed hundreds of sefarim and distributed them worldwide.

== Erlau dynasty today ==
Today the Erlau community numbers well over 500 families in Israel and many more abroad. The largest Erlau communities are located in Jerusalem (Katamon and Ezrat Torah), Bnei Brak, Ashdod, Beitar Illit, Elad, Haifa in Israel and Antwerp and Borough Park, New York in the diaspora.

Besides the main yeshiva campus in Katamon, there are a score of Erlau synagogues, schools and kindergartens, across Israel and in the United States and Europe. All Erlau synagogues are named after the Rebbe's father as "Kehillot Yad Sofer" whilst the chadarim (schools) are named after his great-grandfather as "Talmud Torah Ksav Sofer". The Erlau campus in Jerusalem's Ezrat Torah neighborhood is called "Beis Chasam Sofer".

Yochanan Sofer assumed the mantle of leadership as "Rebbe" until his passing. He was known to the community and to the Jewish population as the Erlauer Rebbe (Yiddish) or Admor of Erlau (Hebrew). He was actively involved in all aspects of the yeshiva, giving daily Torah lectures to both students and elderly members of the Erlau community and surrounding neighbourhood, and prayed the daily prayers together with his pupils. In the late 1990s, he appointed his son, Rabbi Avraham Shmuel Binyomin Sofer (III), to head the main Erlau yeshiva in the Katamon neighborhood of Jerusalem, appointing him rosh yeshiva (dean). Thousands of students from Israel and abroad have graduated the yeshiva, many of whom have become famous rabbis. To date, some 200 students study and live on campus.

In late 2010, Yochanan Sofer travelled to Zurich, Switzerland to attend a fundraising convention. There he suffered a cerebral hemorrhage and was in critical condition. After stabilising his situation, he was flown to Israel and was hospitalised. Miraculously, within weeks, he made a full recovery. In early 2011, in a private event celebrating his recovery, he expressed his will that his eldest son, Rabbi Moshe Sofer, assist him with spiritual guidance of the Erlau community. Moshe Sofer moved from London to Israel and now resides in Katamon, Jerusalem and succeeded his father as Rebbi. Another son, Rabbi Aharon Sofer, also moved to Katamon to be closer to their father and assist at the yeshiva. Another son, Rabbi Avraham Shmuel Binyomin Sofer, continues to preside as rosh yeshiva. Yochanan Sofer died in February 2016, with his son Moshe Sofer taking over leadership of the community.

=== Orientation ===
Though the Erlau dynasty is not historically connected to the Baal Shem Tov, the founder of Hasidut, it is categorized as Hasidic. This may be due to its traditional code of dress and many of its members using pronunciation of Hebrew literature and prayer identical to that of the Hasidim. The Rebbe also conducts a tish on Shabbat and Yom Tov, and the community identifies politically with the Hassidic Agudat Yisrael party, rather than the non-Hasidic Degel HaTorah party. Notwithstanding, the nusach of the prayers at the Erlau synagogues are traditionally nusach Ashkenaz, with daily practice and customs preached according to the teachings of the Chasam Sofer. In his later years, Rabbi Yochanan Sofer publicly observed the origianal Ashkenazic custom to put on Tefillin on Chol Hamoed, a custom that was previously unheard of in Israel, and is generally not practiced by Chassidim worldwide.

== Family ==
Yochanan Sofer has 7 sons, who all hold rabbinical positions:

1. Moshe Sofer (III)(Erlau Congregation – Katamon, Israel (previously London, UK))
2. Yaakov Sofer (Erlau Congregation – Beitar Illit A, Israel)
3. Avraham Shmuel Binyomin Sofer (III) (Rosh Yeshiva – Katamon, Israel)
4. Shimon Sofer (III) (Baka Congregation – Baka, Jerusalem)
5. Akiva Sofer (Erlau Congregation – Bnei Brak)
6. Zalman Sofer (Erlau Congregation – Borough Park, New York)
7. Aharon Sofer (Erlau Congregation – Elad, Israel)

The Sofer family has married into many distinguished rabbinical families and Hasidic dynasties such as Vizhnitz, Seret Vizhnitz, Dushinsky, Ungvar, Minchas Yitzchok, Strikov, Bobov, Biala, Linsk, Zutchke, Nadvorna and Zvhil.

== Lineage of Erlau dynastic leadership ==
1. Rabbi Moshe Sofer (1762–1839), known as the Chatam Sofer, Rabbi of Pessburg and rosh yeshiva of Pressburg Yeshiva son in law of Rabbi Akiva Eiger, (born: Akiva Güns), (1761–1837).
2. Rabbi Avraham Shmuel Binyamin Sofer (1815–1871), known as the Ketav Sofer, Rabbi of Pessburg and rosh yeshiva of Pressburg Yeshiva son of Rabbi Moshe Sofer.
3. Rabbi Shimon Sofer (1850–1944), Rav and dayan of Erlau, Hungary. Son of the Ksav Sofer and grandson of the Chasam Sofer.
4. Rabbi Moshe Sofer (II) (1885-1944), known as the Yad Sofer, presided as Rav and dayan of Erlau, alongside his aging father Rabbi Shimon Sofer.
5. Rabbi Yochanan Sofer (1923-2016), son of Rabbi Moshe Sofer (II) and First Erlauer Rebbe from 1945 until his death.

Rabbi Moses Sofer; Chasam Sofer (1762–1839)
Rabbi Avraham Shmuel Binyamin Sofer; Ksav Sofer (1815–1871)
Rabbi Shimon Sofer; Hisorerus Tshuva (1850–1944)
Rabbi Moshe Sofer (II); Yad Sofer (1885–1944)
Rabbi Yochanan Sofer; Imrei Sofer (1923–2016)
