= Abraham Sofaer (disambiguation) =

Abraham/Avraham Sofaer/Sofer may refer to:

- Abraham Sofaer (1896–1988), British stage actor
- Abraham David Sofaer (born 1938), federal judge for the United States District Court
- Avraham Shmuel Binyamin Sofer (1815–1871), Hungarian rabbi also known as the Ktav Sofer
