= History of the Jews in Verpelét =

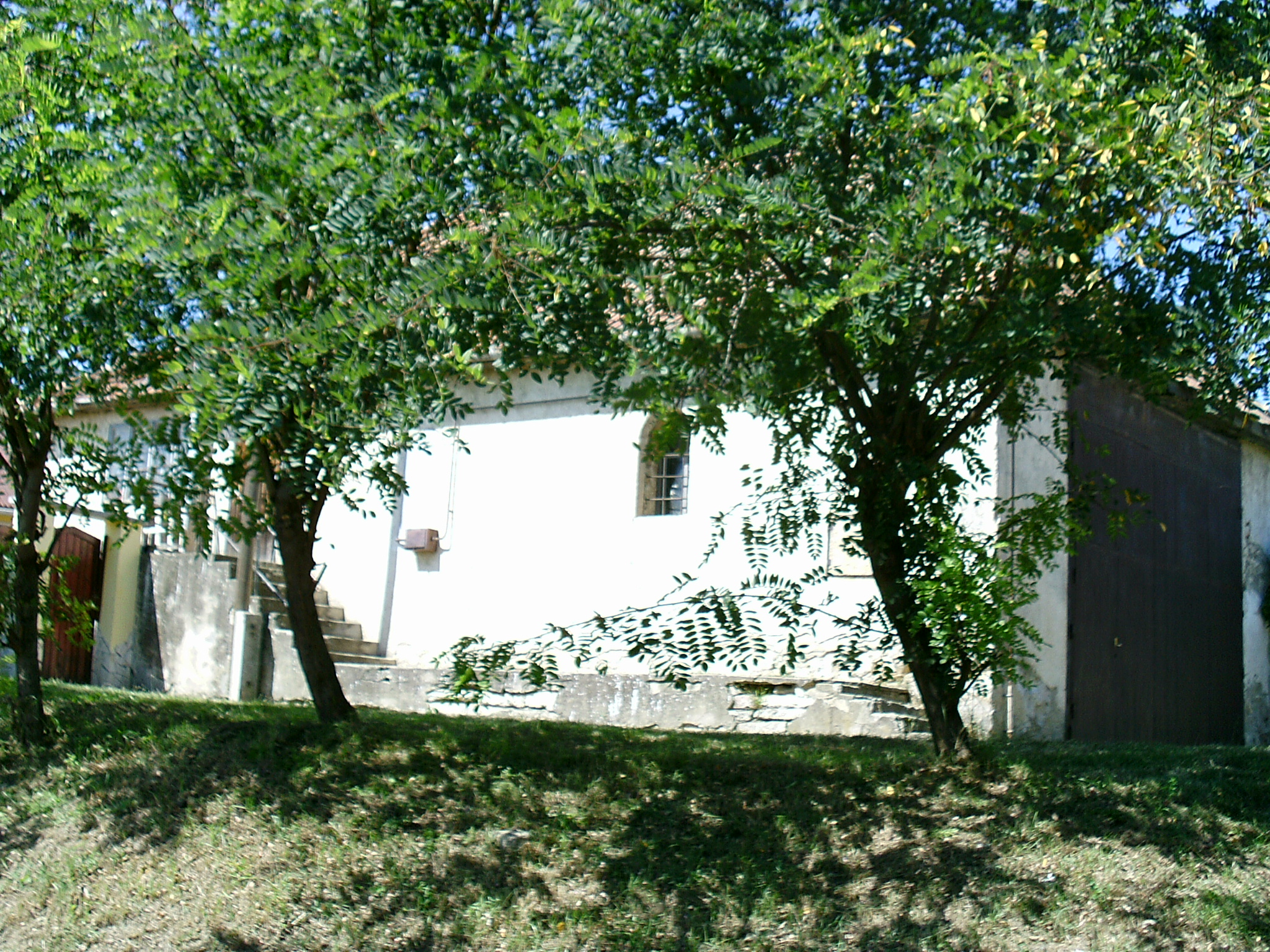
The synagogue now as a volunteer firefighting base

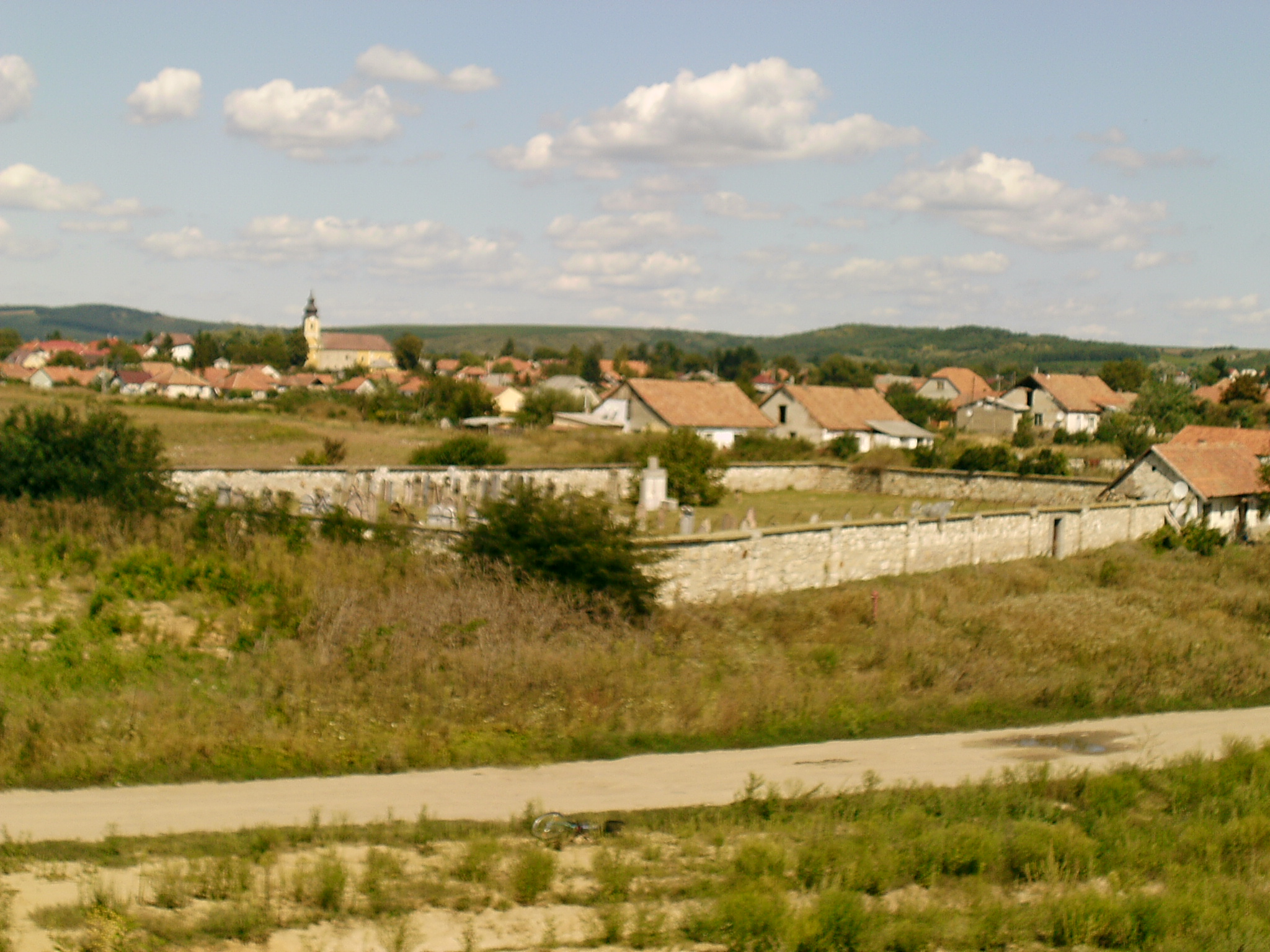
Jewish cemetery

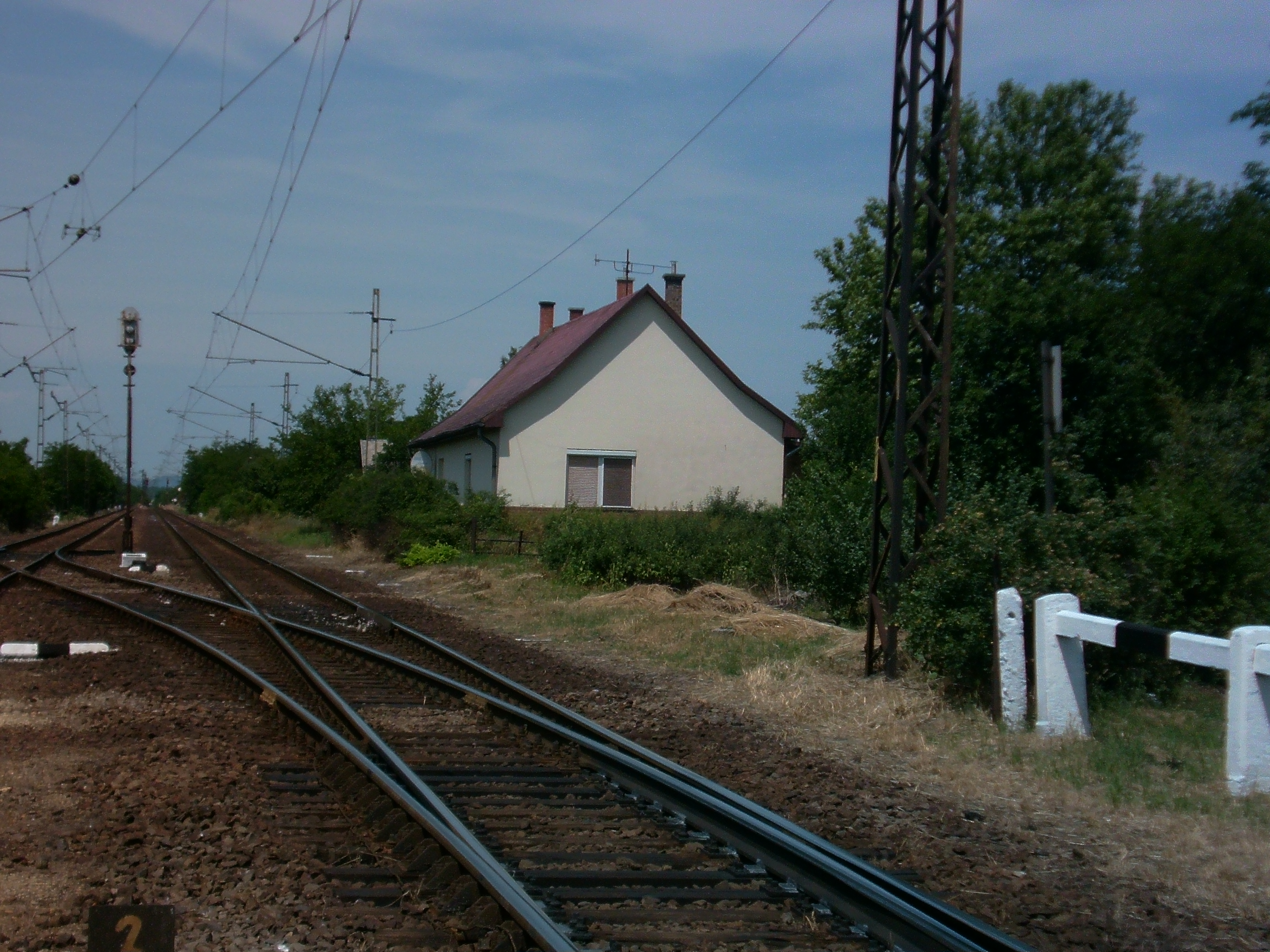
Maklár station (the former)

Jews lived in the northern Hungarian town of Verpelét and the surrounding Heves county from the 15th century or earlier up to the late 17th century, after which they were excluded from the area. During the 19th century the Jewish population increased in the area, with 174 living in the town itself in 1880. Hungary's only wooden synagogue was in Verpelét. Jewish students also travelled in to study at the yeshiva established there in the early 20th century, which was closed down by the government in 1942. In 1944 under the German occupation the Jews of the area were sent for forced labour or killed at Auschwitz; only eleven returned to the town, and the synagogue has been converted for other use.

== Location ==
Verpelét (Yiddish: ווערפעלעט) is a small town in Heves county, Northern Hungary, east of the Mátra Mountains, 50 km (31 mi) southwest of Miskolc, and 13 km (8 mi) west-southwest of Eger.

== Early history ==
The first indication of the settlement of Jews in Heves county is from written documents, dating back to the 15th century. The Verpelét Jewish cemetery, which has been preserved, contains some 40 graves, the oldest of which dates back to 1628.

In the 16th–17th century, under the rule of the Ottoman Empire, Hungarian Jews lived under relatively safe conditions enjoying religious tolerance, though there is no record of Jews living in Verpelét during that time. After the Battle of Mohács (1687), Jews were generally driven out of Hungary and presumably the same was the case with the Jews of Verpelét.

Under the Habsburg monarchy, Jews were discriminated against, and amongst many restrictions, were not allowed to live near mining towns or in Heves county.

== 19th century ==
Starting in 1816, the seat district of Eger published bulletins from which one learns of the dramatic increase of Jewish presence in the Heves and Külső-Szolnok counties.

Accordingly, the census of Jews in the counties of Heves and Külső-Szolnok:

- In 1816 1,592 Jews lived in 46 villages.
- In 1851, 6,879 Jews lived in 145 villages.
- In 1869 11,533 Jews lived in 166 villages.

In 1840, the Jews of Verpelét numbered 139 persons, Rabbi Wolf Tannenbaum (1787–1873) was Rabbi of Verpelét at this time (as seen in his authored book Kirya N’emana printed in 1850). This indicates that the Jews had formed a formal community and framework. His grandson Rabbi Moshe Tannenbaum (1850–1916) succeeded him there as rabbi.

The Austro-Hungarian Compromise of 1867 facilitated the Jewish emancipation by the new Hungarian Parliament and heralded a golden era for Hungarian Jewry, politically, economically and culturally. This lasted until World War I.

In 1880, 174 Jews lived in Verpelét.

From documented records, it may be noted that Jews in the Heves area were an accepted and respected part of the population and engaged in labor, commerce and education as equal and prominent citizens.

== 20th century ==
The beginning of World War I broke this peaceful period for the Jewish communities. In 1918 Jewish properties were looted and the archives destroyed, and the looting continued during the White Terror from 1919 to 1921. The pogroms against the Jews during these revolutionary times made their situation harsh.

More than a hundred Jewish soldiers from Heves county took part in the battles of World War I. Many died in action and countless returned crippled.

Seemingly, the years thereafter were peaceful, and Jews continued to live there, freely participating in commerce and religious practice.

In 1931, 146 Jews lived in Verpelét. They maintained a synagogue, a school, and a Yeshiva or religious study centre founded by Rabbi Yosef Asher Pollack (1888–1944) (author of She'eris Yosef Asher). In 1935, the Yeshiva students numbered over 100 boys, most of whom had come from nearby towns. These boys ate their meals at the homes of the local Jews. Samuel Feuerstein (1894–1983) of Massachusetts, United States, donated funds for a new building which housed the Beth Midrash and a dormitory. Each dormitory room had been built with a sink and shower, though the town still did not have a plumbing system and water was drawn from pumps.

The laying of the cornerstone ceremony for this yeshiva took place with the participation of scores of leading area chief rabbis, as well as hundreds of former yeshiva students, and thousands of Jews from cities in the immediate area. Notable amongst attendees was Rabbi Moshe Sofer (II) of Eger, whose two sons learned at the yeshiva.

== Holocaust of Verpelét Jewry ==
The German occupation brought a radical turning point to the Jews of Verpelét. The yeshiva was closed by governmental decree in 1942, and many of the students were conscripted into forced labor battalions.

On 26 April 1944, the Nazis confined some 6,601 persons from the Heves County to various ghettos in the area. Between 8 and 13 May, the Jews of Verpelét were moved to the deserted Bagólyuk mining area, near Szúcs. They were housed there in the abandoned workers' quarters.

At the end of May, all men in the ghettos fit to work were selected and transported for labour service. The remaining people, mostly women, children and elderly, were taken to the brickyard at Kerecsend for a few days and then to the Maklár Railway Station. From there, they were transported to the Auschwitz concentration camp.

Jewish records cite the date 21 Sivan, 5704 (12 June 1944) as the date Rabbi Yosef Asher Pollack and his wife were killed at Auschwitz. This is the same date recorded for the deaths of Eger residents, Rabbi Shimon Sofer, Rabbi Moshe Sofer (II) and their family.

In 1956 only one Jewish family remained.

According to the Verpelét town council website, eleven Jews returned after the Holocaust. The former synagogue is now the fire department's storage room. Hungary's only wooden synagogue, which was in Verpelét, was torn down in 1961.
