= Soifer =

Soifer is a surname. Notable people with the surname include:

- Alexander Soifer (born 1948), Russian-born American mathematician and mathematics author
- Aviam Soifer (born 1948), American legal scholar and academic administrator

== See also ==
- Sofer (surname)
