= Shimon Sofer (Hungarian rabbi) =

Hungarian rabbi (1850–1944)

Rabbi Shimon Sofer
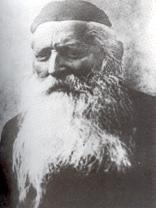
- Title: Rabbi of Erlau

Personal life
- Born: Shimon Sofer; 1850 Pressburg, Kingdom of Hungary, Austrian Empire (today Bratislava, Slovakia)
- Died: 12 June 1944 (aged 94) Auschwitz-Birkenau, Nazi Germany
- Spouse: Esther Fried; Glikle Birnbaum; Malka Esther Spitzer
- Children: 15
- Parent(s): Rabbi Samuel Benjamin Sofer and Chava Leah Weiss
- Occupation: Rabbi, rosh yeshiva

Religious life
- Religion: Judaism
- Denomination: Orthodox Judaism

Jewish leader
- Successor: Rabbi Moshe Sofer II
- Began: 1881
- Ended: 1944

Shimon Sofer (1850 – 2 June 1944) was the rabbi of the Hungarian city of Eger (Erlau) and the progenitor of the Erlauer Hasidic dynasty. His grandson Yochanan Sofer was the Erlauer rebbe in Israel.

== Early life and family ==
Sofer was one of 10 children of Samuel Benjamin Sofer (1815 – 1872), a rabbi known as the Ksav Sofer, who was the son of Moses Sofer (1762 – 1839), known as the Chasam Sofer, the rabbi of Pressburg (present-day Bratislava).

Sofer lived the early part of his life in Kisvárda (Kleinwardein) in Hungary.

In 1870 he married Esther Fried. The couple had a daughter. Esther died after two years of marriage. In 1874 Sofer married his cousin, Glikle Birnbaum. The couple had a son, Akiva, but divorced soon after his birth.

During this period, Sofer lived both in Uman and Kiev.

He then lived in the Polish city of Kraków, where his uncle, also a rabbi named Shimon Sofer (author of Michtav Sofer).

In approximately 1875 Sofer returned to Pressburg and married another cousin, Malka Esther Spitzer, with whom he had 13 children.

In 1881, Sofer became rabbi of the Hungarian city of Eger (Erlau) where he founded a large yeshiva. He also fought Neolog Judaism, a Hungarian reform movement.

Later one of his sons, Moses Sofer (author of Yad Sofer) became rabbi and dayan (rabbinical judge) of Erlau.

== Death and legacy ==
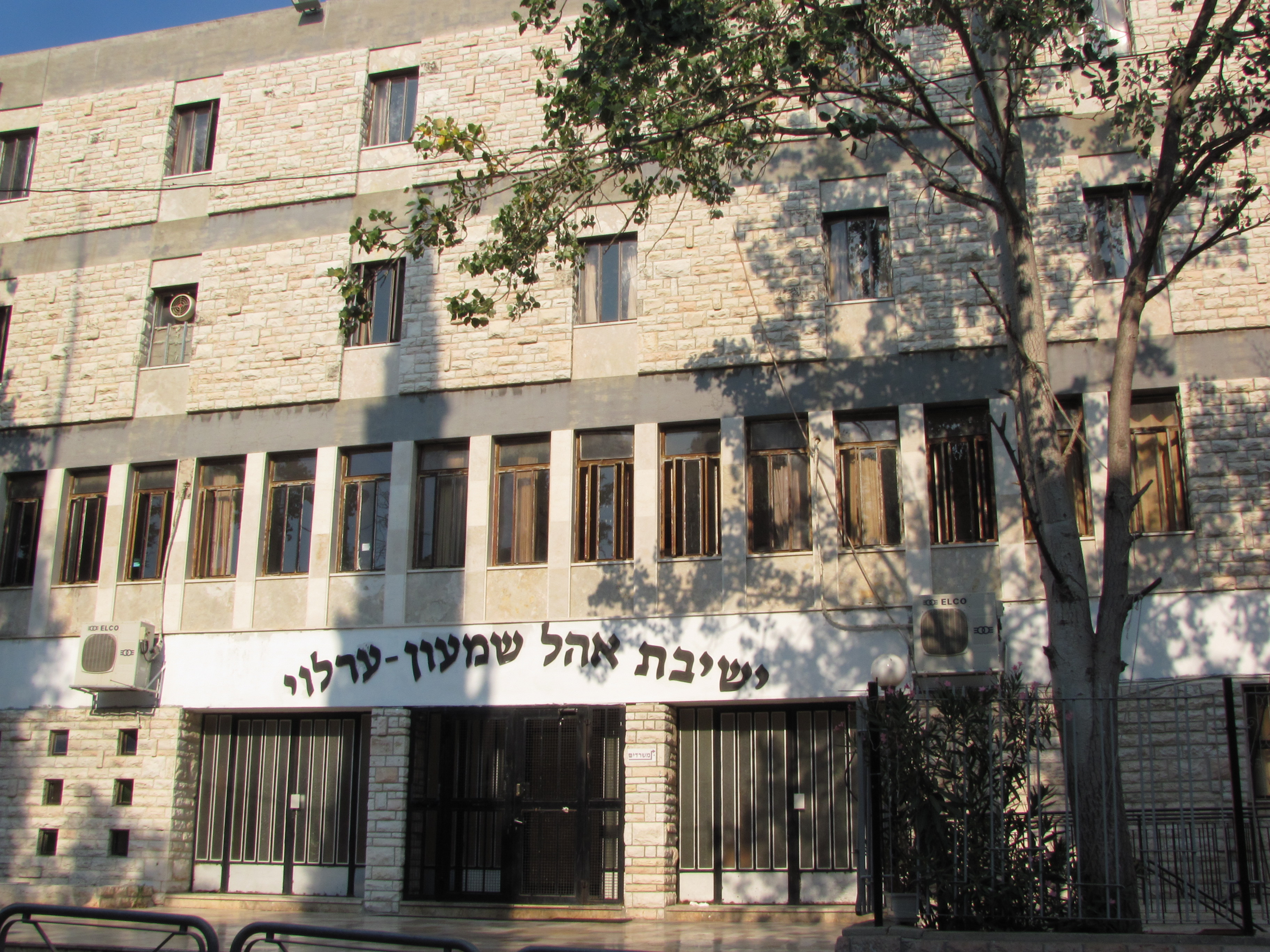
Ohel Shimon-Erlau Yeshiva in Katamon, Jerusalem, named after Sofer.

Sofer led the Jewish community in Erlau for some 63 years. Shortly after the Germans occupied Hungary in May 1944, they placed the Jewish population in ghettos. In June, the Germans deported Sofer and his entire community – some 3,000 Jews – to Auschwitz. They arrived on 21 Sivan (June 2), and were gassed a few hours later. Sofer was 94 at the time of his death. His son, Rabbi Moshe Sofer, was murdered at the same time.

Sofer authored a book of responsa, Hisorerus Teshuva (hence he is known as "The Hisorerus Teshuva"), and Shir Maon on the Torah. He also edited the works of his father and grandfather and prepared them for publication.

Sofer's grandson, Yochanan Sofer, re-founded the Erlau community in Israel in 1953. Yochanan printed his grandfather's sefarim at the Institute for Research of the Teachings of the Chasam Sofer (Hebrew: מכון חת"ם סופר), which he established and also presided over the Ohel Shimon-Erlau Yeshiva, named in memory of Shimon Sofer.

== Children ==
Sofer had 15 children from his three wives, including Moshe Sofer. His son Avraham, a Torah literature scholar, won of the Israel Prize for Torah Literature in 1981, and the Rabbi Kook Prize in 1943.
