= Machzikei Hadass =

Orthodox Jewish political party

Machzikei Hadass was a Haredi Jewish political party in 19th-century Austria-Hungary. At the 1879 Reichsrat election, the party ran on a joint list with the Polish nationalist Polenklub. Krakow's chief rabbi, Shimon Sofer, was elected in the Kolomea-Buczacz-Sniatyn district. He served until his death in 1883.
