= Yochanan Sofer =

Rabbi Yochanan Sofer יוחנן סופר
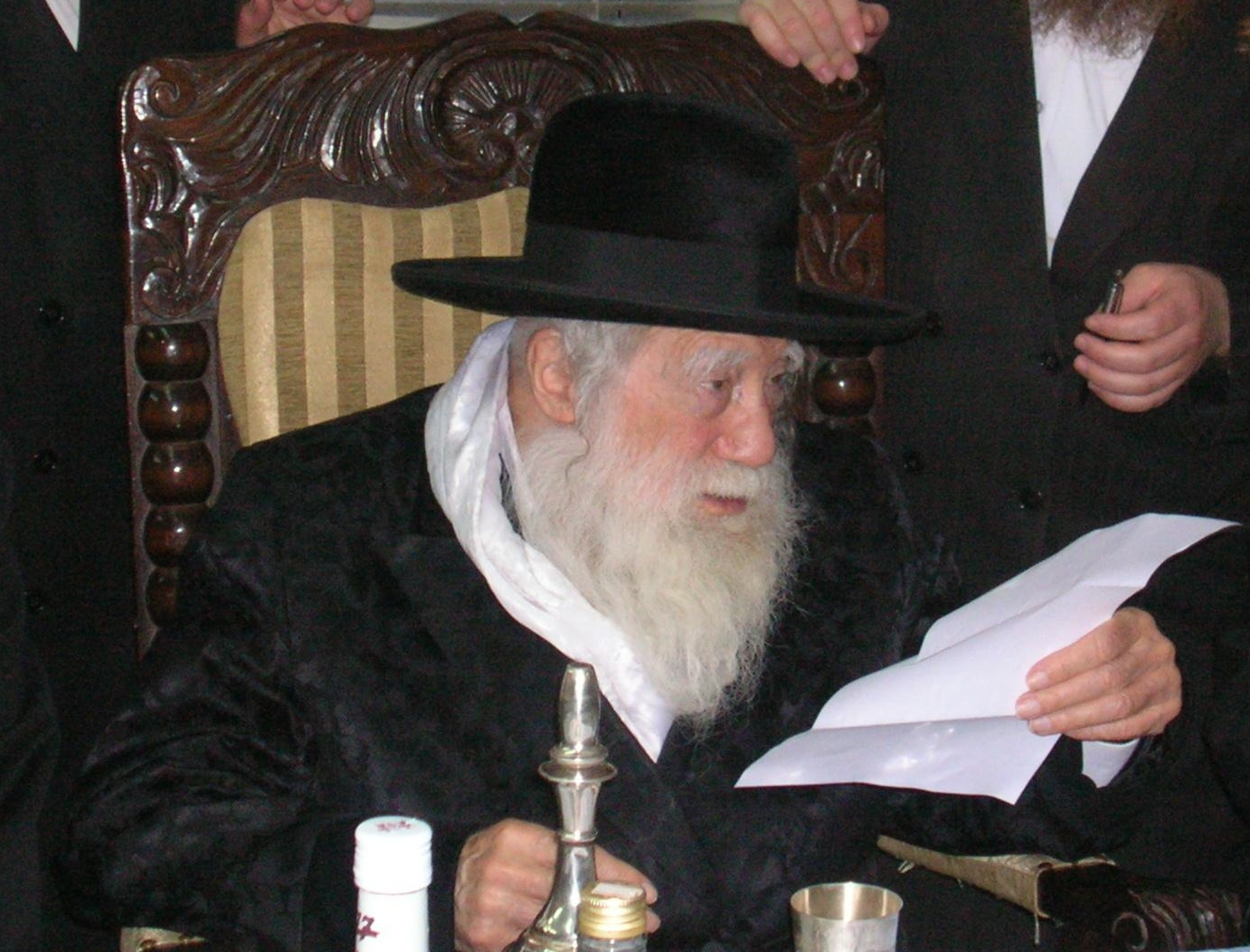
- Title: Erlau Rebbe

Personal life
- Born: January 1, 1923 Eger, Hungary
- Died: February 22, 2016 (aged 93) Israel
- Buried: Mount of Olives
- Spouse: Miriam Pall
- Children: Moshe; Yaakov; Avraham Shmuel Binyomin; Shimon; Akiva Menachem; Zalman Yeshaya Dovid; Aharon
- Parent(s): Rabbi Moshe Sofer; Tushena Schoenfeld
- Dynasty: Erlau / Chassam Sofer

Religious life
- Religion: Judaism
- Denomination: Orthodox Judaism

Jewish leader
- Predecessor: Rabbi Moshe Sofer (II)
- Yeshiva: Ohel Shimon-Erlau
- Began: 1945
- Ended: 2016
- Other: Presiding member of Moetzes Gedolei HaTorah
- Residence: Katamon, Israel
- Dynasty: Erlau / Chassam Sofer

Yochanan Sofer (Hebrew: יוחנן סופר; January 1, 1923 – February 22, 2016) was the rebbe of the Erlau dynasty. He was born in Eger, Hungary, where his father and grandfather were also rebbes. After surviving the Holocaust, he founded a yeshiva, first in Hungary and then a few years later in Jerusalem.

== Family history ==
Sofer's father Moshe Sofer, grandfather Shimon Sofer, great-grandfather Samuel Benjamin Sofer and great-great-grandfather Moses Sofer (known as the Chasam Sofer) were all rabbis.

Shimon Sofer led the Jewish community in Eger for some 64 years. He and his community were deported to Auschwitz by the Nazis in 1944 where at the age of 94 he was murdered by the Nazis, as was his son, Moshe Sofer, and many others from the city of Eger.

== Early life ==
Yochanan Sofer was born in Eger in 1923. He received his rabbinical education from his father, and at yeshivas.

His father and grandfather were murdered at Auschwitz, but he survived the war in the "Glass House" in Budapest and returned to Eger to lead the few Jewish survivors.

In 1946 he and Moshe Stern, the rabbi of Debrecen became co-roshei yeshiva of the year-old Yeshivas Chasam Sofer, the only yeshiva in Hungary at that time, with Sofer serving as rosh yeshiva Sunday, Monday, and Tuesday and Stern for the second half of the week, while serving their respective communities the rest of the time. Sofer slept in the dormitory with the students and refused to accept a salary. After a year and a half he opened a yeshiva in Eger. After the Budapest yeshiva closed, the rest of the students moved to Eger.

In 1947, he re-established the yeshiva in Eger with a small group of boys and adolescents (mostly orphans). He married and was appointed rabbi of the Orthodox Jewish community there.

== Move to Israel ==
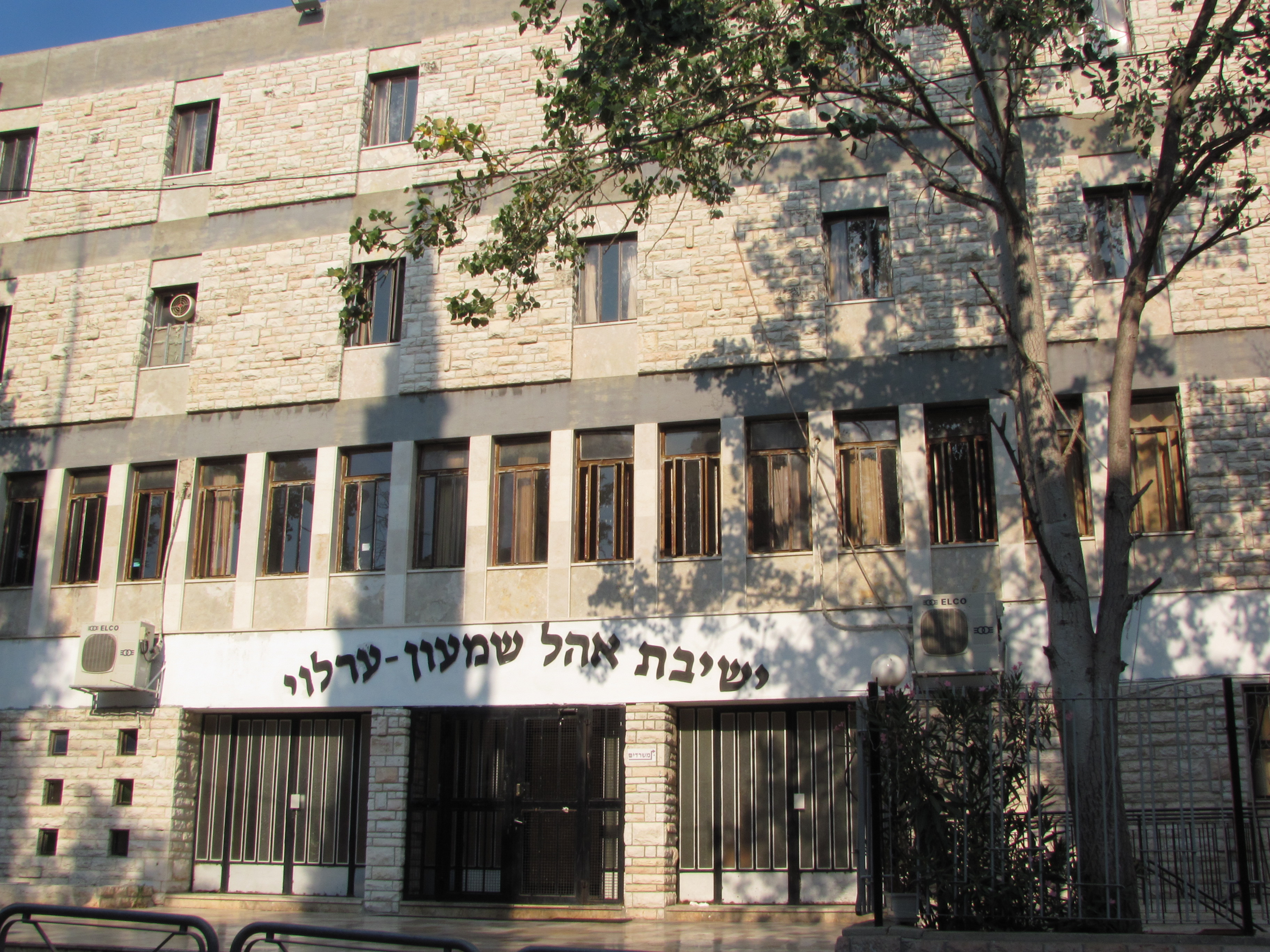
Ohel Shimon-Erlau campus in Jerusalem

Due to Communist Hungary's oppression of Judaism, Sofer and members of his community escaped Hungary. For a short period of time, the yeshiva merged with the Pressburg Yeshiva in Jerusalem, which was headed by Akiva Sofer (known as the Daas Sofer), a great-grandson of the Chasam Sofer. Yochanan Suffer served there as a maggid shiur.

During this time he became a close disciple of Aharon Rokeach, the Belzer rebbe. Although Sofer's ancestors were not hasidic, he was influenced by Rokeach and the Skverer rebbe to adopt numerous hasidic customs. Sofer named his youngest son Aharon after Rokeach.<name=obit/>

In 1953 Sofer founded the Erlau yeshiva and community in the Katamon neighbourhood of south-central Jerusalem, starting with the purchase of a few rooms in the building of the former Syrian Consulate on Yotam Street. The yeshiva was named the High Yeshiva of Rabbi Akiva Eiger after the father-in-law of the Chasam Sofer and later expanded to the whole building, where Sofer founded a dormitory and orphanage for Holocaust survivors and students from needy families. According to the Jerusalem Post, "He never moved from the non-haredi neighborhood, unlike other hassidic leaders who once lived in the area but who moved to haredi neighborhoods elsewhere in Jerusalem."

In 1961, Sofer constructed a new building in the empty lot adjacent to the yeshiva, named Ohel Shimon-Erlau after his grandfather. The campus includes a beth midrash, which serves as the main synagogue and study hall for the yeshiva gedola, a smaller study hall for the yeshiva ketana, dormitory, classrooms, library, kitchen and offices. In addition, Sofer opened the Institute for Research of the Teachings of the Chasam Sofer. This Institute researches, deciphers, and distributes handwritten documents of the Chasam Sofer, his pupils and descendants.

He died on February 22, 2016. Streets in Jerusalem were closed as thousands attended the funeral procession. Israeli President Reuven Rivlin said he was

a unique figure, beloved and admired by secular, religious and ultra-Orthodox Jews. With his pleasant ways, he represented both the Hasidim and Mitnagdim of Hungarian Jewry. The death of a public leader and head of a dynasty who was a Holocaust survivor and refugee who lost his father, mother and sisters in the labor and death camps, must also remind us of the respect and concern for the Holocaust survivors whose numbers are steadily dwindling, and the obligation to tell our people's history until the last generation.

== Erlau communities ==
Sofer set up a network of communities around Israel and abroad, including batei medrash (called by the name Yad Sofer), Talmud Torahs (known as Ksav Sofer) and kollelim (called by the name Chasam Sofer). The main communities are in Katamon, Ezrat Torah, El'ad, Bnei Brak, Beitar Illit, Ashdod and Haifa. The community in Israel is estimated to number 500 families.

Sofer was known to the Jewish population as the Erlauer Rebbe (Yiddish) or Admor of Erlau (Hebrew). He was actively involved in all aspects of the yeshiva, giving daily shiurim to both students and elderly members of the Erlau community and surrounding neighbourhood, and prayed the daily prayers together with his pupils.

== Opinion and politics ==
Sofer was considered a leading halakhic authority with enormous influence on the Orthodox Jewish community, as well as an expert in Israeli politics and security issues. He was often called upon to voice his opinion on global Jewish issues.

He was appointed to the Moetzes Gedolei HaTorah of Agudath Israel by Yisrael Alter when he was 38 years old after the protocol was amended to allow him, as the original protocol allowed only rabbis above the age of 40 to join. He was also appointed a member of the administration of Mifal HaShas by its founder, Yekusiel Yehudah Halberstam, the Klausenberger rebbe.

The rabbinical authorities of the Sofer family and their disciples opposed Zionism. They did not approve of the formation of a Jewish state nor the use of Hebrew for mundane purposes. They believed that the Messiah must arrive prior to the liberation of the Holy Land and that the Hebrew language was designated solely for the use of Torah study and prayer.

Sofer adopted an approach to Zionism similar to that of Aharon Rokeach. This ideology allows for dialogue with the Zionist leaders and for representation in the Knesset, though it does not give mandate or halachic justification to the legislative system of the State of Israel.

Sofer maintained that as a matter of Jewish law, any territorial concession to Arabs by Israel would endanger the lives of all the Jews in the Land of Israel and was therefore forbidden. He also insisted that even discussing the possibility of such concessions shows weakness and would encourage Arab attacks, and thus endanger Jewish lives. He was quoted as saying to Israeli Foreign Affairs Minister Silvan Shalom: "I am not prepared to cede even one grain of the Land of Israel to the Arabs." Sofer was also opposed to the unilateral pullout from Gaza and was quoted as saying, "Whoever leads to the transfer (of Jews from parts of Israel) is destroying the country".

He also came out publicly against the Hebron Protocol of 1997 which divided the city into H1 and H2. He was quoted as saying that if not for the existence of the Jewish community of Hebron, regular visits to the Tomb of Machpela would not be possible.

Sofer's wife Miriam Pall, died in 1999. They had seven sons.
