= Moshe Sofer (II) =

Hungarian rabbi

Rabbi Moshe Sofer HY"D
- Title: Dayan of Erlau

Personal life
- Born: Moshe Schreiber; 10 May 1885 Eger, Kingdom of Hungary
- Died: 12 June 1944 (21 Sivan 5704) Auschwitz-Birkenau, Nazi Germany
- Spouse: Tushene Schoenfeld
- Children: 6, including Yochanan
- Parent(s): Rabbi Shimon Sofer (II) and Malkah Esther Spitzer
- Dynasty: Erlau (Hasidic Dynasty), Chassam Sofer
- Occupation: Rabbi, Dayan (rabbinic judge)

Religious life
- Religion: Judaism
- Denomination: Orthodox Judaism
- Yeshiva: Yeshivas Chassam Sofer - Erlau
- Ended: 1944
- Dynasty: Erlau (Hasidic Dynasty), Chassam Sofer

Moshe Sofer (II) (May 10, 1885 – June 12, 1944) (German; Moses Schreiber) was a prominent Orthodox Jewish (Charedi) Rabbi in the early 20th century. He was Dayan of Erlau, Hungary and author of a halachic responsa sefer named Yad Sofer.

He was the son of Rabbi Shimon Sofer (II) (Hisorerus Tshuva), grandson of Rabbi Avraham Shmuel Binyamin Sofer (Ksav Sofer) and great-grandson of Rabbi Moshe Sofer (Chasam Sofer).

He was the father of Rabbi Yochanan Sofer, the rebbe of Erlau until his death in 2016.

Sofer edited and published the works of the Chassam Sofer, Ksav Sofer and Sofer Mahir (by Rabbi Yitzchak Leib Sofer of Drohobych, son of the Ksav Sofer) He was murdered at Auschwitz during the Holocaust.

== Family ==
Sofer was born on 10 May 1885 to his father Shimon (Chief Rabbi of Erlau) and mother Malka Esther Spitzer. He married Tushene Schoenfeld and they had six children, four of whom were murdered in the Holocaust.

== Death and legacy ==
In 1944, Sofer and his family were deported to Auschwitz by the Nazis (with the exception of his son Avraham Shmuel Binyamin) together with the Jews of Erlau.

On 12 June 1944 (21 Sivan 5704), Sofer, his wife, daughters and his father Rabbi Shimon were murdered by the Nazis.

After World War II, his sons Avraham Shmuel and Yochanan reunited in Budapest where they re-established the Yeshivas Chassam Sofer.
