= Ariela Sofer =

Israeli and American operations researcher

Ariela Sofer (Hebrew: אריאלה סופר) is an Israeli and American operations researcher whose research expertise includes algorithms for mathematical optimization and their application to the reconstruction of three-dimensional shapes from positron emission tomography. She is a professor of systems engineering and operations research at George Mason University, and Divisional Dean for the Volgenau School of Engineering at George Mason University.

== Education and career ==
Sofer has a bachelor's degree in mathematics and a master's degree in operations research from the Technion – Israel Institute of Technology. She completed a Ph.D. in operations research at the George Washington University in 1984, with the dissertation Efficient matrix methods for solving nonlinearly constrained optimization problems via Newton's method when the projected Lagrangian Hessian is given in dyadic form.

As a faculty member at George Mason University, she chaired the Systems Engineering and Operations Research Department for nearly 16 years before becoming associate dean in 2018, interim dean in 2020, and divisional dean in 2023.

== Books ==
Sofer's books include:

- Linear and Nonlinear Programming (with Stephen G. Nash, McGraw Hill, 1996)
- Linear and Nonlinear Optimization (with Stephen G. Nash and Igor Griva, Society for Industrial and Applied Mathematics, 2008)

== Recognition ==
Sofer was named as a Fellow of the Institute for Operations Research and the Management Sciences (INFORMS) in 2016. She is also a 2018 Fellow of the Institute of Industrial and Systems Engineers (IISE) and a 2022 Fellow of the International Council on Systems Engineering (INCOSE), "for significant contributions to systems engineering education and advancing the recognition of systems engineering in academia".
