= Avraham Shmuel Binyamin Sofer =

Hungarian rabbi

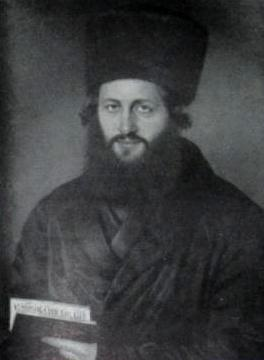
- Born: March 13, 1815 (1 Adar II 5575 Anno Mundi); Pressburg, Kingdom of Hungary, Habsburg monarchy, now Bratislava, Slovakia
- Died: December 31, 1871 (aged 56) (19 Teves 5632 Anno Mundi); Pressburg
- Resting place: Bratislava
- Other name: Ksav Sofer
- Occupation: Rabbi
- Known for: Ksav Sofer Responsa on Shulchan Aruch; Ksav Sofer on Gittin; Ksav Sofer on the Pentateuch
- Spouse: Chavah Leah Weiss
- Children: Yaakov Akiva Sofer – (d. 1912); Moshe M. Sofer (d. 1927); Simcha Bunim Sofer – (d. 1907); Yitzchak Leib Sofer – (d. 1907); Shimon Sofer (1850–1944); Shlomo Sofer; Sarel Sofer; Rachel Sofer; Hindel Sofer; Rosa Sofer
- Parent(s): Moshe Sofer & Sara Eger

Avraham Shmuel Binyamin Sofer (German: Abraham Samuel Benjamin Schreiber; Hungarian: Szófér Ábrahám Sámuel), also known by his main work Ksav Sofer or Ketav Sofer (trans. Writ of the Scribe), (1815–1871), was one of the leading rabbis of Hungarian Jewry in the second half of the nineteenth century and rosh yeshiva of the famed Pressburg Yeshiva.

== Early years ==
Shmuel Binyomin Sofer was born in Pressburg (now Bratislava) on March 12, 1815. His father, the famed Chasam Sofer, Rabbi of Pressburg, was the leader of Hungarian Jewry and one of the leading Rabbi's of European Jewry. His mother Sara (1790–1832) was the daughter of Rabbi Akiva Eger, Rabbi of Posen, one of the greatest Talmudic scholars of his time.

When he was six years old, his family fell ill and among them little Shmuel Volf, as he was called. The doctors had already given up on him. As a segulah they added "Avraham" to his name, but to no avail. They already called the Chevra Kadisha and lit candles as was the custom of the time and they said the last rites. Then the doctors approached his father the Chasam Sofer and said "We know that you are a Godly and holy man; if with your prayers you cannot help your son; on our part, all hope is lost". After hearing this; the Chasam Sofer went to a corner where all his manuscripts were; and said a short prayer. At that time the sick child Avraham Shmuel Binyomin in his great weakness started screaming the Shema, and their prayers were answered; Shmuel Binyomin's condition took a turn for the better. The bewildered doctors said to the Chasam Sofer; now we truly know that you are a Godly man; to which he answered, "I hadn't given up hope, not even for a second." The great pupils of the Chasam Sofer later testified that the Chasam Sofer said at the time that "for one Jubilee, I begged him out"; as Shmuel Binyomin lived for another fifty years and died at age fifty six.

He first studied under Rabbi Mordechai Ephraim Fishel Sofer (not a relation, as far as is known) and then entered his father's famous Yeshiva; and became one of its outstanding students.

== Adulthood ==
At age eighteen in 1833 he married Chavah Leah Weiss, daughter of Rabbi Yitzchok Weiss of Gorlitz, who was well known for his piety. The latter gave him a large dowry and promised to support him for 15 years. The wedding was held in the town of Kamaren after which the couple settled in Pressburg where Sofer continued his studies and helped his father with the yeshiva.

He succeeded his father as rabbi of Pressburg in 1839.

== Death and legacy ==
On December 31, 1871 the Ksav Sofer died in Bratislava and the mantle as Rabbi of Pressburg passed to his son, Rabbi Simcha Bunem Sofer known as the Shevet Sofer.

Another son, Rabbi Shimon Sofer was appointed as Rabbi of Erlau (Eger). Shimon's grandson Rabbi Yochanan Sofer has established numerous Synagogues in Israel and one in the USA, naming them Kehila Kdosha (trans. Holy Congregation) Ksav Sofer.

A street in the Givat Shaul neighborhood in Jerusalem is named after him.
