= Michael Dov Weissmandl =

Hungarian rabbi (1903–1957)

Rabbi Michael Dov Weissmandl (Note: Also known as Michael Ber Weissmandl, he took the forename Chaim after surviving the Holocaust. His surname is sometimes spelled Weissmandel or Weismandel.)
- Weissmandl before the war

Personal life
- Born: 25 October 1903 Debrecen, Hungary
- Died: 29 November 1957 (aged 54) Mount Kisco, New York
- Spouse: Bracha Rachel Ungar; Leah Teitelbaum
- Parent(s): Yosef and Gella Weissmandl

Religious life
- Religion: Judaism
- Denomination: Orthodox
- Yeshiva: Nitra Yeshiva, Mount Kisco, New York
- Position: Rosh Yeshiva
- Began: 1946
- Ended: 29 November 1957

Michael Dov Weissmandl (Yiddish: מיכאל בער ווייסמאנדל; 25 October 1903 – 29 November 1957) was an Orthodox rabbi of the Oberlander Jews of present-day western Slovakia. Along with Gisi Fleischmann he was the leader of the Bratislava Working Group which attempted to save European Jews from deportation to Nazi death camps during the Holocaust and was the first person to urge Allied powers to bomb the railways leading to concentration camp gas chambers. Managing to escape from a sealed cattle car headed for Auschwitz in 1944, he later emigrated to America where he established a yeshiva and self-sustaining agricultural community in New York known as the Yeshiva Farm Settlement. Accusing the Zionist Jewish Agency of having frustrated his rescue efforts during the Holocaust, he became a staunch opponent of Zionism after the war.

== Early life ==
Michael Ber was born in Debrecen, Hungary on 25 October 1903 (4 Cheshvan 5664 on the Hebrew calendar) to Yosef Weissmandl, a shochet. A few years later his family moved to Tyrnau (now Trnava, Slovakia). In 1931 he moved to Nitra to study under Rabbi Shmuel Dovid Ungar, whose daughter, Bracha Rachel, he married in 1937. He was thus an oberlander (from the central highlands of Europe), a non-Hasidic Jew.

Weissmandl was a scholar and an expert at deciphering ancient manuscripts. In order to carry out his research of these manuscripts, he traveled to the Bodleian Library in Oxford, England. It is related that he was treated with great respect by the Chief Librarian of the Bodleian after an episode when he correctly identified the author of a manuscript that had been misattributed by the library's scholars.

== World War II and the Holocaust ==
While at Oxford University, Weissmandl volunteered on 1 September 1939 to return to Slovakia as an agent of World Agudath Israel. When the Nazis gathered sixty rabbis from Burgenland and sent them to Czechoslovakia, Czechoslovakia refused them entry and Austria would not take them back. Weissmandl flew to England, where he was received by the Archbishop of Canterbury and the Foreign Office. Explaining the tragic situation, he succeeded in obtaining entry visas to England for the sixty rabbis.

=== The Working Group ===
When the Nazis, aided by members of the puppet Slovak government, began their moves against the Slovak Jews in 1942, members of the Slovak Judenrat formed an underground organization called the Bratislava Working Group. It was led by Gisi Fleischmann and Weissmandl. The group's main activity was to help and save Jews as much as possible, in part through payment of bribes and ransom to German and Slovak officials. In 1942, the Working Group initiated high-level ransom negotiations with the Germans (ref. Fuchs and Kranzler books). The transportation of Slovak Jews was in fact halted for two years after they arranged a $50,000 (in 1952 dollars) ransom deal with the Nazi SS official Dieter Wisliceny.

Largely with the help of diplomats, Gisi Fleischmann and possibly also Weissmandl was able to smuggle letters or telegrams to people he hoped would help save the Jews of Europe, alerting them to the progressive Nazi destruction of European Jewry. He and Gisi Fleischmann managed to send letters to Winston Churchill and Franklin D. Roosevelt, and he entrusted a diplomat to deliver a letter to the Vatican for Pope Pius XII. He originated the proposal via Rabbi Solomon Schonfeld in London to bomb the rails leading to Auschwitz, but this, along with subsequent suggestions from others, were ignored.

The Working Group helped distribute the Auschwitz Protocols. Kasztner was the first to get it in April 1944 during his Bratislava visit. The recipients didn't do anything meaningful with the report except Moshe Krausz in Budapest who sent it to George Mantello in Switzerland around 19 June 1944 via Romanian diplomat Florian Manilou who was Mantello's friend. Mantello received the reports early 21 June 1944 and publicized its content right away. This immediately triggered large-scale grass roots demonstrations in Switzerland, sermons in Swiss churches about the barbarism, tragic plight of Jews and starting 24 June 1944 an extraordinary Swiss press campaign of about 400 articles in German, French, Italian protesting the atrocities against Jews.

The events in Switzerland and possibly other considerations led to threats of retribution against Hungary's Regent Miklós Horthy by President Roosevelt, Winston Churchill and others. This was one of the main factors which forced Horthy to order on 7 July 1944 stopping the death camp transports by Hungary, which until then took about 12,000 Hungarian Jews a day to Auschwitz.

=== Deportation ===
In October 1944, Weissmandl and his family were rounded up and put on a train headed for Auschwitz. Weissmandl escaped from the sealed train by opening a hole with a saw he had secreted in a loaf of bread. He jumped from the moving train and made his way to Bratislava. There he found shelter in a bunker in a storage room of a private house, along with 17 other Jews who included the Rebbe of Stropkov Menachem Mendel Halberstam.

Rezső Kasztner visited the bunker several times, once, to the consternation of the inhabitants, in the company of SS officer Max Grüson. In April 1945, Kasztner visited again, this time in the company of another SS officer who took the party to Switzerland in a truck with an escort of German soldiers. On arriving in Switzerland, Weissmandl suffered a major heart attack.

== Post-war America ==
=== Personal recovery ===
After the war, Weissmandl arrived in the United States having lost his family and having been unable to save Slovak Jewry. At first, he was so distraught that he would pound the walls and cry bitterly on what had befallen his people. Later he remarried and had children, but he never forgot his family in Europe and suffered from depression his entire life because of the Holocaust.

His second marriage was to Leah Teitelbaum (1924/5–9 April 2009), a daughter of Rabbi Chaim Eliyahu Teitelbaum and a native of Beregszász, Hungary. With his second wife, Weissmandl had five children.

=== Establishment of an American yeshiva ===
See: Yeshiva of Nitra

In November 1946, Weissmandl and his brother-in-law, Rabbi Sholom Moshe Ungar, re-established the Nitra Yeshiva in Somerville, New Jersey, gathering surviving students from the original Nitra Yeshiva. With the help of Rabbi Shraga Feivel Mendlowitz, Weissmandl bought the Brewster estate in Mount Kisco, in Westchester County, New York and moved his Yeshiva there in 1949. There he established a self-sustaining agricultural community known as the "Yeshiva Farm Settlement". At first, this settlement was not welcome by its neighbors, but in a town hall meeting, Helen Bruce Baldwin (1907–1994) of nearby Chappaqua, wife of New York Times military correspondent and Pulitzer Prize winner, Hanson W. Baldwin, impressed by Weissmandl, defended its establishment and wrote a letter-to-the-editor to the New York Times regarding it. Weissmandl designed the community's yeshiva to conform with Talmudic accounts of agricultural settlements, where a man would study Torah continuously until an age suitable for marriage, whereupon he would farm during the day and study in the evenings. While this novel approach was not fully realized, the yeshiva flourished. Currently, the settlement is known as the Nitra community. (See also Kashau (Hasidic dynasty)).

=== Later life ===
During his later years, Weissmandl suffered from chronic heart disease and was frequently hospitalized. He suffered a severe heart attack in the early winter of 1957 and was hospitalized for several weeks. Upon his release, he attended the yeshiva's fundraising banquet, and then was readmitted to the hospital. His health deteriorated and he died on Friday, 29 November 1957 (6 Kislev 5718) at the age of 54. His second wife never remarried.

Weissmandl is buried in the Beth Israel Cemetery - also known as Woodbridge Memorial Gardens - in Woodbridge New Jersey, in the Khal Adas Yereim Vien section. On 1 September 2021, his son Rabbi Shmuel Dovid Weissmandl died aged 69 in floodwaters in Elmsford, New York.

== Religious work ==
=== Books ===
Two of Weissmandl's books were published posthumously.

- Toras Chemed (Mt. Kisco, 1958) is a book of religious writings that includes many commentaries and homilies, as well as hermeneutic material of a kabbalistic nature. Included in this book are the observations that led to what is called the Torah Codes.
- Min HaMeitzar (Jerusalem, 1960) is a book that describes Rabbi Weissmandl's war-time experiences. The title consists of the first two words of Psalm 118:5, meaning "from the depths of despair", literally "From the Straits". This is the main publication in which Weissmandl's accusations against the Zionist organizations appear. In the book Rabbi Weissmandl quotes part of a letter sent to the Bratislava Working Group by Nathan Schwalb of the Jewish Agency "Pioneer" (Hehalutz) group. The letter essentially says that the Allies are shedding their blood on the battle field and after defeating the Nazis will divide Europe, as happened after World War I. The Jews of Europe too must shed their blood in order to have right to claim a post-war state: Israel. The letter then states that money is enclosed for the Bratislava Jewish leaders to go on an "outing" (escape to Palestine).

According to Yehuda Bauer, the book reflects Weissmandl's ideological biases and was edited by Weissmandl's relatives after his death, limiting the historical reliability of the book. For example, it does not mention the last two transports from Slovakia in October 1942, which contradict Weissmandl's belief that the Working Group's bribes were responsible for the cessation of deportation.

In 1958, Rabbi Weissmandl republished the magnum opus of Rabbi Jonah Teomim-Frankel, Kikayon D'Yonah with his own footnotes and glosses. In the introduction to this volume, Rabbi Weissmandl gives an emotional history lesson.

== Sources ==
- Fuchs, Dr. Abraham (1984). The Unheeded Cry (also in Hebrew as Karati V'ein Oneh). Mesorah Publications.
- Hecht, Ben. Perfidy (also in Hebrew as Kachas)
- Kranzler, Dr. David. Thy Brother's Blood
- Kranzler, David (1991). "Three who tried to stop the Holocaust". Judaica Book News. 18 (1): 14–16, 70–76. On Rabbi Michael-Ber Weissmandl, Recha Sternbuch and George Mantello
- Kranzler, Dr. David. Holocaust Hero: Solomon Shoenfeld - The Untold Story of an Extraordinary British Rabbi who Rescued 4000 during the Holocaust
- Fatran, Gila. The "Working Group", Holocaust and Genocide Studies, 8:2 (1994:Fall) 164–201; also see correspondence in issue 9:2 (1995:Fall) 269–276
- Satinover, Jeffrey (1997). Cracking the Bible Code. William Morrow. ISBN 0-688-15463-8
