= Julius Steinfeld =

Austrian Jewish leader who helped Jews emigrate from Austria (1884–1974)

Julius (Hebrew: יעקב שלמה Yaakov Shlomo/ Jacob Solomon) Steinfeld (October 10, 1884 – March 25, 1974) was born in Neunkirchen, Austria to Wilhelm (Binyamin Zeev) and Rosalia (Seril) (nee Deutsch). He later moved to Vienna where he became the head of the community's Agudath Israel. He was also known as the shtadlan from Vienna.

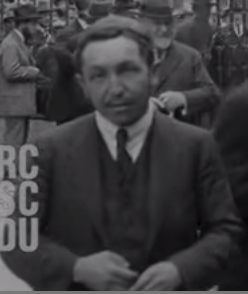
Julius Steinfeld at the First World Congress (Knessia Gedolah) of the World Agudath Israel - Vienna 1923

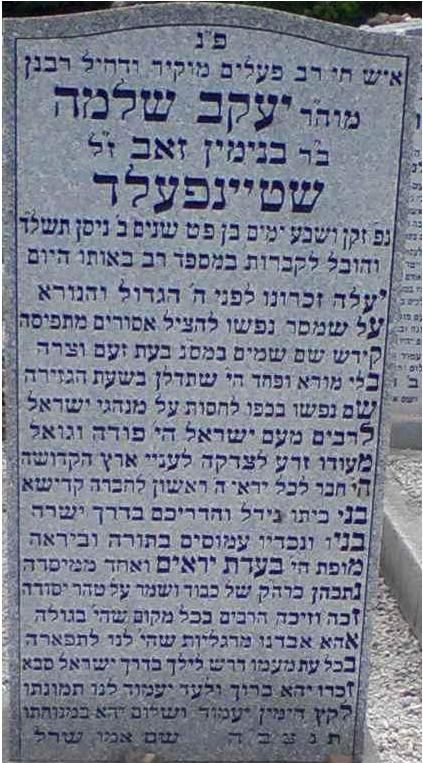
Tombstone of Julius Steinfeld

After the Anschluss in 1938, Steinfeld toiled to help Jews emigrate from Austria. With great personal risk Julius negotiated with Adolf Eichmann to obtain exit visas for Jews trying to flee Nazi-controlled Austria. His courageous interventions on behalf of his fellow Jews, led to his imprisonment by Eichmann. His cousin Emil Deutsch succeeded in bailing him out of prison. In coordination with Rabbi Dr. Solomon Schonfeld, Julius was instrumental in arrangements for the Kindertransport where thousands of Jewish children were sent from Vienna to England. Julius had left Vienna and returned many times during the Nazi period in order to procure entry visas to nearly 30 countries throughout the world including Palestine, the United States and England. All in all almost 9,000 Jews were helped to emigrate due to his efforts.

Steinfeld endangered his life by staying in Nazi Austria until he was informed that he would be deported if he did not leave. He left Vienna on May 9, 1941. Due to his extensive negotiations with the Nazis the U.S. Department of State initially suspected he was a German spy and refused to grant him a visa. He found refuge in Havana, Cuba until 1942 when the State Department was convinced that his contacts with the Nazis were used only to save lives. He settled in the Williamsburg section of Brooklyn, NY.

In the U.S. he continued his rescue work to save European Jews from the Holocaust by joining the Vaad Hatzalah of the Agudath Harabbanim. Julius was active in the Vienner shul of Williamsburg which was founded by his son-in-law Karl Richter and was modeled after the famous Ashkenaz Schiff Shul in Vienna of which Julius and Karl were active members of and that was destroyed by the Nazis on Kristallnacht.

Due to his negotiations during the Holocaust, Steinfeld was asked to testify at the Eichmann trial in Israel. On the basis of his religious anti-Zionism, which was an initial founding point of Agudath Israel, Steinfeld refused.

Steinfeld died in Brooklyn, New York, on March 25, 1974. He is buried in the Viennese Section (ווינער חלקה) at Beth Israel Cemetery and Mausoleum in Woodbridge, New Jersey.

== Bibliography ==
- They Called Him Mike by Yonason Rosenblum, Mesorah Publications, 1995. ISBN 0-89906-623-2.
- Holocaust Hero: The Untold Story of Solomon Schonfeld, an Orthodox British Rabbi by David Kranzler, Ktav Publishing House, 2003. ISBN 0-88125-730-3.
- Thy Brothers Blood: The Orthodox Jewish Response During the Holocaust by David Kranzler, Mesorah Publications, 1987. ISBN 0-89906-858-8.
