= Central Rabbinical Congress =

American rabbinical organization

- Founded: 1953
- Headquarters: 85 Division Ave, Brooklyn, NY 11249
- Key People: Rabbi Lipa Klein
- Website: crckashrus.org

The Central Rabbinical Congress (in full: Central Rabbinical Congress of the US and Canada, commonly abbreviated to CRC; Hebrew: התאחדות הרבנים דארצות הברית וקנדא, romanized: Hisachdus HaRabbonim DeArtzos HaBris VeCanada) is an American rabbinical organization that is a consortium of various Haredi Jewish groups, with offices in Brooklyn, New York.

== History ==
In the aftermath of World War II, when thousands of Jewish survivors arrived in the United States and began the process of rebuilding the dozens of communities which were decimated in the Holocaust, this organization was founded in 1953, with the stated goal of serving as an umbrella rabbinical body to unite the newly transplanted Haredi communities, and to provide said communities with all of their religious needs.

The organization was founded by the rebbe of Satmar, Rabbi Joel Teitelbaum, alongside Rabbi Levi Yitzchok Greenwald of Tzehlim, Rabbi Yosef Greenwald of Pupa, Rabbi Shimon Yisroel Posen of Shopron, Rabbi Yonasan Steif of Vien, and Rabbi Moshe Teitelbaum of Siget, who later assumed the title of rebbe of Satmar. These Rabbis formed the executive board of the organization.

The organization established a special panel to maintain and enforce traditional Jewish law, called Vaad L'Chizuk Hadas (in Hebrew: ועד לחיזוק הדת), led by Rabbi Rafael Blum of Kashau (Hasidic dynasty), Rabbi Hillel Lichtenstein of Krasna, Rabbi Yakov Lebowitz of Kapish, and Rabbi Moshe Bick of Mezhbizh.

An advisory board named Vaad L'inyonei Hora'ah (in Hebrew: ועד לעניני הוראה), was directed by Rabbi Naftali Hertzka Henig of Sharmash. The first dean was Rabbi Mordcha Shabse Berkowitch, who served until 1979.

Throughout the years, the organization grew exponentially, and quickly turned into one of the most recognized rabbinical organizations, currently having over 300 communal rabbis as members, representing a reported collective constituency of over 250,000 people throughout the US and Canada.

The kashrus division was founded in 1975 by Rabbi Rotenberg, the Voideslove Rav. In 1980 Rabbi Yidel Gruber was appointed for the general development of the kashrus department. Rabbi Gruber resigned in about 1998.

Activities of the organization include a Kashrus division, a Beth Din, co-ordinating big rabbinical conventions and assemblies, addressing Jewish issues of importance to the general Jewish population.

The executive director of the entire organization was Rabbi Yitzchok Glick a/k/a Rabbi Bela Gluck, who served in this position for over 50 years, assisted by the first Beth Din secretary Rabbi Shabse Mordche Berkowitz, replaced in 1979 by Rabbi Yishay Buchinger as secretary until his death, then by Rabbi Mattes Berkowitz as secretary and Chaim Shlomo Ilowitz as co-ordinator.

== Kasher supervision ==
With many Jews arriving from Europe, whose Kashrut standards differed from those generally accepted in America, the need for a kosher certification agency was felt, and the organization established a division to supervise food industry establishments and grant hechshers, which was led by Rabbi Yissachar Ber Rottenberg of Wodzislaw and Rabbi Asher Babad of Tartikov. One of the first major Kashrus projects was the founding of a Shechita, to produce poultry and beef in line with the high standards of these communities.

This division certifies hundreds of food manufacturing plants, producing thousands of kosher products, as well as many bakeries, catering halls, and eateries, two large poultry plants, and five meat processing plants, employing 50 shochtim (slaughterers), a few dairy farms, and famous wineries.

This division, currently the biggest of the organization, consists of a large team of Mashgichim who travel across the world supervising and certifying the plants and food production facilities, physically monitoring and ensuring that all requirements are met.

In 2018, this division expanded and modernized the laboratory with new machinery and equipment, employing workers in the field of chemical research, analyzing various ingredients to ascertain their Kashrus viability, and analyzing the various plants and seeds for bug infestation.

Once a year, prior to Passover, this division published the highly acclaimed Mafteach Ha'Kashrus, which includes all laws relevant to the Passover holiday, and general Kashrus information. Throughout the year, the division publishes a magazine with articles about topics of interest in the field of Kashrut and updates.

The Kashrut division is currently headed by the Chief Rabbi of Mount Kisco, New York, Rabbi Hillel Weinberger of Serdahely, who serves as the Chief Justice of said division, and Rabbi Shia Heschel Bick of Mezhbizh, and Rabbi Yishai Lieberman Rabbi of Maate Yisuscher. Rabbi Lipa Klein serves as Executive Rabbinic Administrator of kashrut division.

== Rabbinical services ==
The organization has a full-service Beth Din, providing arbitration and mediation services mainly in marital and business disputes, settling hundreds of cases annually, and co-ordinating tens of Gittin (Jewish divorces). The Beth Din also handles all matters pertaining to Kidushin (Jewish weddings), ensuring the couple is allowed to be married in accordance with Halacha.

The Beth Din division is currently headed by Rabbi Mendel Zilber, widely known as the Freimaner Rav, who serves as the Chief Justice, and some of the Dayanim (rabbinical judges) are Rabbi Yitzchak Menachem Eichenstein of Galanta, Rabbi Meshulam Polatchek (Av Beis Din Meged Yehuda in Brooklyn, New York), and Rabbi Abraham Gross.

The first Beth Din secretary was Rabbi Shabse Mordche Berkowitz, who was succeeded after his death by Rabbi Yishay Buchinger.

The organization also maintains, in a separate office, a full-time Beis Hora'ah, with rabbis taking shifts from early morning until midnight to answer questions from the public on Jewish law. This division was led for many years by Rabbi Shalom Kraus of Udvari.

== Views ==
In October 2025, the CRC organized the "Cry of the Exile" protest in New York City against the potential end of the Haredi community in Israel's exemption from service in the IDF. Two rival leaders of the anti-Zionist Satmar Hasidic sect, Aaron and Zalman Teitelbaum, urged their followers to participate in the protest, a rare deviation from their traditional policy not to protest Israel during wartime.
