= David Kranzler =

American professor of library science (1930–2007)

David H. Kranzler
- Kranzler in or around 1977
- Born: May 19, 1930; Frankfurt am Main, Germany
- Died: November 29, 2007 (aged 77); Poughkeepsie, New York
- Citizenship: American
- Education: BA and MA, Brooklyn College; MLS, Columbia University; PhD, Yeshiva University
- Occupations: Professor of library science, Queensborough Community College
- Known for: Holocaust research
- Notable work: The Man Who Stopped the Trains to Auschwitz (2001)

David H. Kranzler (May 19, 1930 – November 29, 2007) was an American professor of library science at Queensborough Community College, New York, who specialized in the study of the rescue of Jews during the Holocaust.

== Early life and education ==
Kranzler was born in Germany, one of seven children, to Yerachmiel and Chana Kranzler of Würzburg. His family emigrated to the United States in 1937 to avoid Nazi persecution, and he was raised in Brooklyn, New York. He studied at the Yeshiva Torah Vodaath in Williamsburg, Brooklyn and in 1953 he obtained his BA from Brooklyn College, followed by an MA in 1958, also from Brooklyn, and an MLS degree in 1957 from Columbia University.

In 1971 Kranzler was awarded a doctorate by Yeshiva University, for a thesis entitled The History of the Jewish Refugee Community of Shanghai: 1938–1945, the result of a seven-year study of the 17,000 Jews who fled to Shanghai from Nazi Germany. His dissertation mentor was Dr. Abraham G. Duker. Duker, who had prepared his own dissertation under Salo W. Baron at Columbia University, was University Professor of Jewish History and Social Institutions and Director of Libraries at Yeshiva from 1962 to 1972, and a long-time editor of Jewish Social Studies. Kranzler's manuscript was published by Yeshiva University Press in 1976 as Japanese, Nazis & Jews: The Jewish Refugee Community of Shanghai, 1938–1945. Reviewing the book for The American Historical Review, Leona S. Forman called it a "painstaking documentation of a vignette in Jewish history".

== Career ==
=== Positions held ===
After working as a school librarian, Kranzler joined the faculty of Queensborough Community College (QCC) of the City University of New York in 1969, and was a professor in the library department until his retirement in 1988. He was one of the founders and the first director of QCC's Holocaust Resource Center and Archives (now known as the Harriet and Kenneth Kupferberg Holocaust Center).

He served as scholar-in-residence in numerous congregations, college campuses, and centers, including the Spanish-Portuguese Synagogue (under Rabbi Marc D. Angel) in Manhattan; Kodima Synagogue in Springfield, Massachusetts (under his brother-in-law Rabbi Alex Weisfogel); and the Ohio State University Holocaust Center (under Professor Saul S. Friedman). From October 2002 to January 2003, Kranzler was a Baron Friedrich Carl von Oppenheim Research Fellow for the Study of Racism, Antisemitism, and the Holocaust at Yad Vashem's International Institute for Holocaust Research; the title of his research project was "A Comparative Study on the Worldwide Rescue Effort by Orthodox Jewry During the Holocaust Within the Context of Rescue in General".

=== Research ===
Kranzler became the leading historian on the subject of Jews aiding and rescuing the Jews during the Holocaust, and was among the first to document the efforts of Orthodox Jewish organizations, such as the Vaad Ha-hatzala and Agudath Israel. Historian Alex Grobman referred to him as "the pioneer of research on Orthodox Jewry during the war." Kranzler's books Solomon Schonfeld: His Page in History, co-authored with Gertrude Hirschler, and his later Thy Brother's Blood (1987) were the first to focus on this area. He wrote a paper, "Orthodox Ends, UnOrthodox Means", for American Jewry during the Holocaust (1983), a report organized by the American Jewish Commission, led by Arthur J. Goldberg.

Kranzler lectured on the subject in America, Israel, Europe and the Far East. He interviewed and recorded over a thousand people, including some of the major Jewish rescuers, such as Hillel Kook (also known as Peter Bergson), George Mantello, Rabbi Solomon Schonfeld, Julius Kuhl, and close family and associates of rescuers no longer alive, including Rabbi Michael Ber Weissmandl and Recha Sternbuch. He established a research archive of about a million pages and interviews (mostly audio on about 1,000 cassettes) which were at his Brooklyn home. By 1978 the archive held over 10,000 documents on Jewish residents of Shanghai. After Dr. Kranzler's death the archive was transferred to Yad Vashem.

In his book Thy Brother's Blood: The Orthodox Jewish Response During the Holocaust (1987), Kranzler argued that more lives could have been saved if American-Jewish leaders had lent more support to efforts in Europe to halt the deportations, including the attempts, in Slovakia and Hungary, to bribe and/or pay ransom to the SS. Criticizing the book's factual accuracy, Efraim Zuroff described it as "an extremely one-sided polemic" and "a popular invective of limited scholarly value". (Zuroff would go on to write The Response of Orthodox Jewry in the United States to the Holocaust: The Activities of the Vaad Ha-Hatzala Rescue Committee, 1939-1945, a book that accused Orthodox groups of not cooperating with non-Orthodox and Zionist organizations.) In the view of historian Robert Moses Shapiro, the defects of Thy Brother's Blood, particularly its bitter tone and poor editing, undermined its "important and gripping story".

The mid-1944 grassroots protests in Switzerland, including street demonstrations, Sunday sermons and the Swiss press campaign of about 400 headlines about the atrocities were triggered by George Mantello making public a summary of the Auschwitz Report (Vrba–Wetzler report) is the subject of Kranzler's book The Man Who Stopped the Trains to Auschwitz: George Mantello, El Salvador and Switzerland's Finest Hour (2000), which has a foreword by Joe Lieberman. The Vrba–Wetzler report, written by two Auschwitz escapees, Rudolf Vrba and Alfred Wetzler, and distributed mostly by the Bratislava Working Group, provided a detailed account of the mass murder taking place inside the Auschwitz concentration camp. Kranzler was convinced that Mantello's campaign to publicize the report led to the stopping of the mass transports of Jews from Hungary to Auschwitz in July 1944, and enabled the Raoul Wallenberg mission and other important initiatives in Hungary and elsewhere. The manuscript won the 1998 Egit Prize from the Histadrut for the best manuscript on the Holocaust.

During his fellowship with Yad Vashem's International Institute for Holocaust Research in 2002–2003, Kranzler engaged in a research project entitled "A Comparative Study on the Worldwide Rescue Effort by Orthodox Jewry During the Holocaust Within the Context of Rescue in General."

== Recorded talks ==
Some of David Kranzler's talks about rescue are on YouTube:

- Rabbi Weissmandl (ed)
- George Mantello & the Swiss people stopping the Hungarian Auschwitz transports (At Hebrew University)
- Rescue by El Salvador, its diplomat George Mantello & Swiss People (Feb 2003)
- Recha Sternbuch - Heroine of Rescue
- Rabbi Solomon Schoenfeld
- Interview with Rabbi Solomon Schonfeld (London)
- Interview with Hillel Kook (New York)

== Selected publications ==
- (1974). "Restrictions against German-Jewish Refugee Immigration to Shanghai in 1939". Jewish Social Studies, 36.
- (1976). Japanese, Nazis & Jews: The Jewish Refugee Community of Shanghai, 1938–1945. New York: Yeshiva University Press. ISBN 978-0893620004
- (1979). My Jewish Roots: A Practical Guide to Tracing and Recording Your Genealogy and Family History. New York : Sepher-Hermon Press. ISBN 978-0872030732
- (1982) with Gertrude Hirschler. Solomon Schonfeld: His Page in History. Judaica Press. ISBN 978-0910818469
- (1983) "The Japanese Ideology of Anti-Semitism and the Holocaust". In Braham, Randolph L. (ed). Contemporary Views on the Holocaust. Holocaust Studies Series. Dordrecht: Springer. ISBN 978-94-009-6683-3
- (1984) with Joseph Friedenson. Heroine of Rescue: The Incredible Story of Recha Sternbuch Who Saved Thousands from the Holocaust. Brooklyn: Mesorah Publications Ltd. ISBN 978-0899064604
- (1984). "The Role in Relief and Rescue during the Holocaust by the Jewish Labor Committee", in Seymour Maxwell Finger (ed.). American Jewry during the Holocaust. New York: Holmes and Meier. Appendix 4–2.
- (1984). "Orthodox Ends, Unorthodox Means: The Role of the Vaad Hatzalah and Agudath Israel during the Holocaust", in Seymour Maxwell Finger (ed.). American Jewry during the Holocaust. New York: Holmes and Meier. Appendix 4–3.
- (1987). Thy Brothers' Blood: The Orthodox Jewish Response During the Holocaust. Brooklyn: Mesorah Publications. ISBN 978-0-89906-858-9
- (1988). "The Swiss Press Campaign That Halted Deportations to Auschwitz and the Role of the Vatican, the Swiss and Hungarian Churches". In Bauer, Yehuda (ed.). Remembering for the Future: International Scholars' Conference, Oxford. Oxford: Pergamon. 1:156–170.
- (1991). "Three Who Tried to Stop the Holocaust". Judaica Book News 18(1): 14-16, 70-76.
- (1991) with Eliezer Gevirtz. To Save a World: Profiles in Holocaust Rescue (2 volumes). New York: CIS Publications. ISBN 978-1560620600 and ISBN 978-1560620891
- (1998). Rav Breuer: His Life and His Legacy. New York: Philipp Feldheim. ISBN 978-1583301630
- (2000). The Man Who Stopped the Trains to Auschwitz: George Mantello, El Salvador, and Switzerland's Finest Hour. Syracuse: Syracuse University Press. ISBN 978-0-8156-2873-6
- (2002). "Orthodoxy's Finest Hour." [A review article of The Response of Orthodox Jewry in the United States to the Holocaust: The Activities of the Vaad Ha-Hatzala Rescue Committee, 1939-1945, by Efraim Zuroff.] Jewish Action, 63, no. 1.
- (2003). Holocaust Hero: The Untold Story of Solomon Schonfeld, an Orthodox British Rabbi. Brooklyn: Ktav Publishing House. ISBN 978-0-88125-730-4
- (2005) with Gutta Sternbuch. Gutta: Memories of a Vanished World. New York: Feldheim Publishers. ISBN 978-1583307793

== See also ==
- Rescuers of Jews during the Holocaust
- Righteous Among the Nations
