= Schiffschul =

Former synagogue in Vienna, Austria

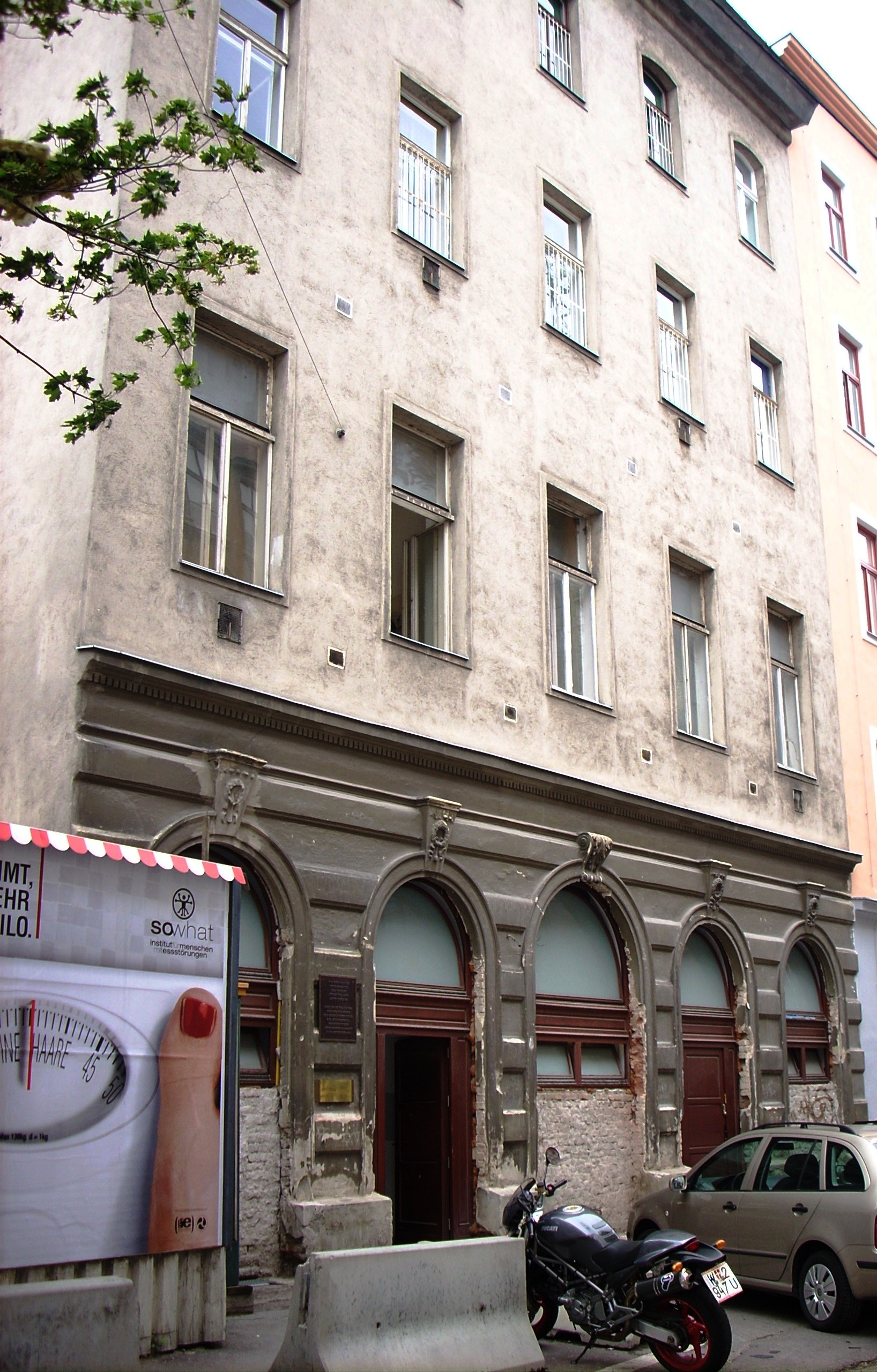
- Adjacent building to the former synagogue, as it looked prior to renovations

- Location of the former synagogue in Austria

Religion
- Affiliation: Orthodox Judaism (former)
- Rite: Nusach Ashkenaz
- Ecclesiastical or organizational status: Synagogue (1864–1938)
- Status: Destroyed

Location
- Location: Grosse Schiffgasse 8, Second district, Leopoldstadt, Vienna 1020
- Country: Austria
- Interactive map of Schiffschul
- Coordinates: 48°12′59″N 16°22′33″E

Architecture
- Architects: unknown (1864); Ignaz Reiser (1923)
- Type: Synagogue architecture
- Established: 1852 (as a congregation)
- Completed: 1864
- Destroyed: 9 November 1938 on Kristallnacht
- Capacity: 750 worshipers

Schiffschul, officially Khal Adas Yisroel, was a former Orthodox congregation and synagogue, located at Grosse Schiffgasse 8, in the second district, known as Leopoldstadt, Vienna, Austria. The synagogue was destroyed by the Nazis on Kristallnacht in 1938. The congregation worshiped in the Ashkenazi rite.

Located adjacent to the Schiffshul and was a building that currently houses a shul called Bet Hamidrasch Khal Chassidim. This shul is led by Rabbi Avraham Yona Schwartz. The upper level of the building has been functioning as a yeshiva since the 1940s and is headed by Rabbi Michoel Pressburger. It also serves as temporary spiritual refuge to thousands of Jewish refugees from Iran who have transited through Vienna over the past 30 years.

There is a memorial plaque the site of the former synagogue that reads "This Jewish place of worship was destroyed by the Nazis in the pogrom of November 1938."

== History ==
With the constitution of the Israelitsche Cultus-Gemeinde (official Jewish community) in 1852, the shul was established. The first rabbi was Rabbi Shlomo Zalman Spitzer (d. 1894) who was elected in 1852. He was a son in law of the Chasam Sofer 1763-1839 (Rabbi Moshe Sofer). As such, the community had a direct connection to the Pressburg Orthodox community. The liberal contingent grew in influence, and subsequently Rabbi Spitzer led the observant Orthodox secessionist congregation to a new location, built from 1858 to 1864. The new synagogue accommodated seats for 750 worshipers (500 for men, 250 for women).

Rabbi Yeshaya Fuerst (d. 1943) succeeded Rabbi Spitzer in 1894. He was a disciple of the Ksav Sofer 1815-1872 (Rabbi Avrohom Shmuel Binyamin Sofer) and he too had close ties to the Pressburg Orthodox community.

The Cantor of the shul prior to the Holocaust was Avrohom Braun, who was hired in 1922. The shamash (sexton) was Reb Hersh Lipschutz, who immigrated to the United States, where he was active in the Vienner Shul.

With the approach of the Holocaust and the March 1938 Anschluss, Rabbi Fuerst fled for his life from Vienna and died in England in 1943.

== Community in the United States ==
Some members of the persecuted community succeeded in reaching America and settled in Williamsburg. These refugees reestablished a kernel of the Vienner community in the then Agudath Israel headquarters on Bedford Avenue on May 15, 1941. They named the new congregation Khal Adas Yereim and invested great energy in its development. In 1948 the Vienner Shul moved to a new building on Rodney and South 5th Street, and appointed Rabbi Yonasan Steif as its Rabbi. Due to the community's growth they moved in the mid 50s to a larger building on 27 Lee Avenue. Today the Williamsburg congregation bears little resemblance to its predecessor due to the mostly Chassidic nature of the community. There is a branch of the Vienner shul in Borough Park at 1350 50th St.

== Gallery ==
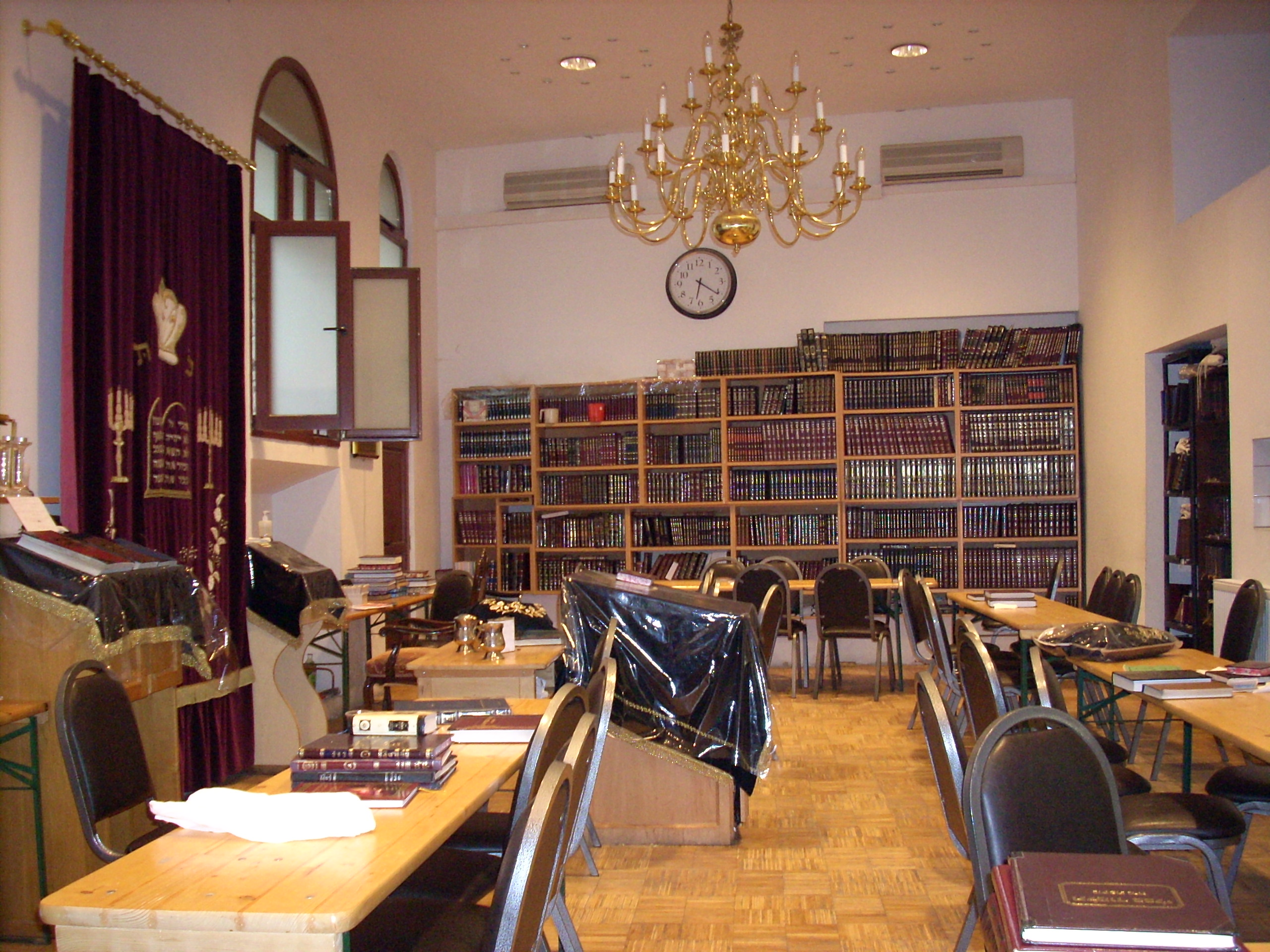
Bet Hamidrasch Khal Chassidim

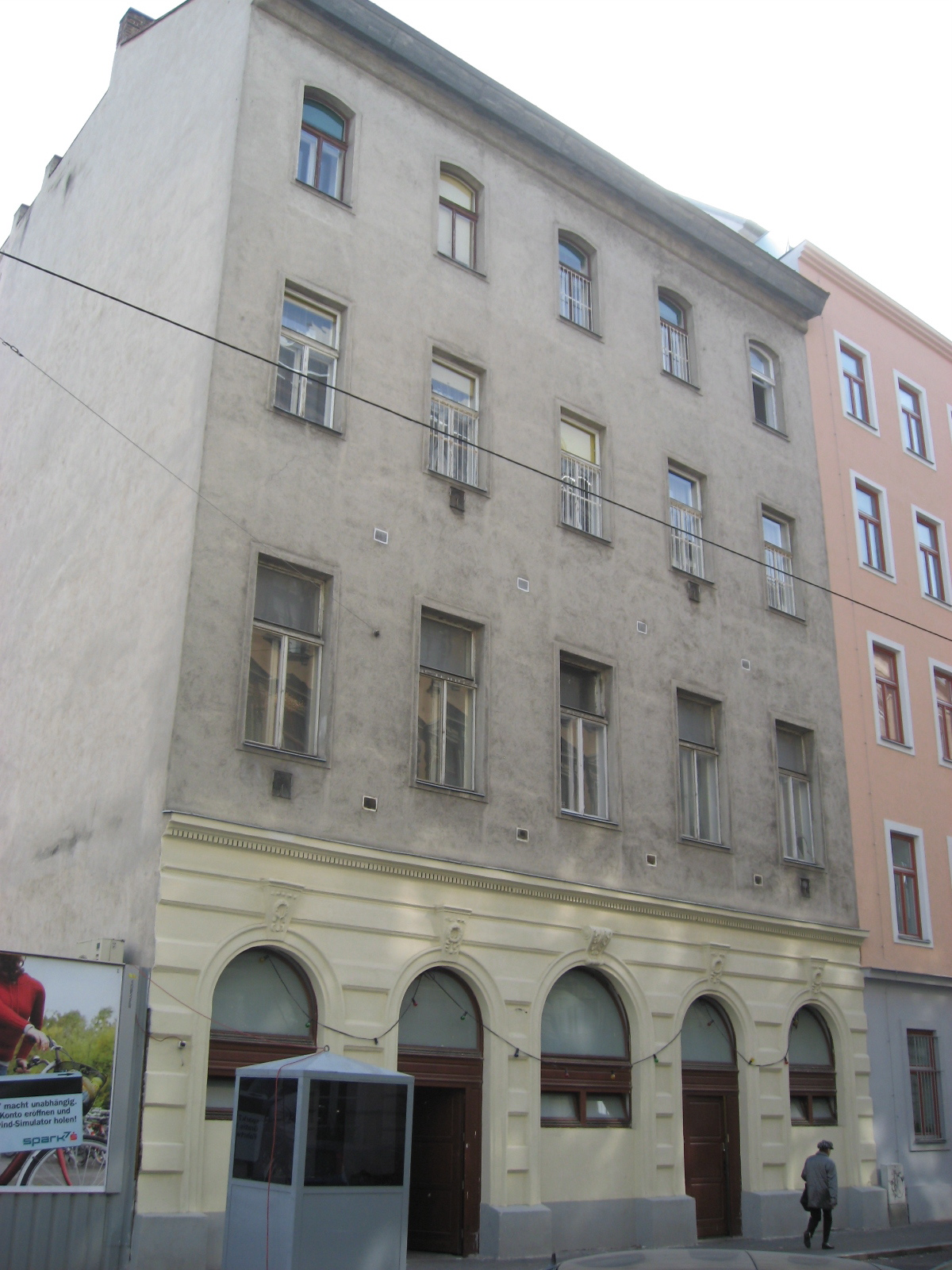
Adjacent building currently housing Khal Chassidim after renovations

== See also ==
- History of the Jews in Vienna
