= Oberlander Jews =

Historical Jewish population in the Kingdom of Hungary

Oberlander Jews (Yiddish: אויבערלאנד, romanized: Oyberland, lit. 'Highland'; Hebrew: גליל עליון "Upper Province") were the Jews who inhabited the northwestern regions of the historical Kingdom of Hungary, which are contemporary western Slovakia and Burgenland.

"Oberland", in this context, is a Hungarian-Jewish historiographic term, unrelated to the territory of Upper Hungary (Oberungarn, sometimes Oberland). Its origin lies in the immigration pattern of Jews into the country during the 18th century. Those arriving from Austria and Moravia settled in the adjacent counties of the northwest, mainly from Trencsén to Sopron, and gradually spread further; however, a large swath in the center of northern Hungary, between Szepes and Hajdú, remained closed for Jewish settlement until all residential limits were lifted in 1840. Thus, a demarcation line separated the Austrian and Moravian Jews from the Galician Jews, who emigrated to the northeastern territories. Those west of it were known as "Oberlander" (highlanders), and the Galicians were "Unterlander Jews" (lowlanders). In rabbinic sources written in Hebrew, it was translated as the Upper and Lower Provinces (Galil E'lion, Galil Takhton). The designation was coined by the former. After 1840, the geographical boundary dividing Oberland and Unterland was the linguistic one between Western Yiddish and Middle ("Polish") Yiddish: It stretched from the Tatra Mountains, between Poprád (present-day Poprad) and Liptószentmiklós (present-day Liptovský Mikuláš), Nagyszabos (present-day Slavošovce) and Rozsnyó (present-day Rožňava), continuing just north of Debrecen and south of Miskolc, until reaching the Hungarian border in Kolozsvár (present-day Cluj-Napoca). While sometimes applied to all western Jews, like those in Budapest and beyond, it came to denote the Orthodox ones who resided in contemporary Slovakia, west of the boundary detailed above, and in contemporary Burgenland. Their ancestors arrived in two waves: The first, comprising Austrians, came after the expulsion of the Jews from Vienna in 1670. They were welcomed by Paul I, Prince Esterházy, who allowed them to settle in Burgenland and to form the Seven Communities on his lands. Another, much larger, wave entered Hungary in the wake of an Imperial decree from 1727, which limited the number of Jews allowed to marry in Moravia to 5,106. It remained in effect until 1848.

Oberland also followed an acculturation pattern of its own, as its Jews tended to embrace the German language and culture. In spite of undergoing thorough modernization, they remained largely Orthodox, and were primarily influenced by the Hatam Sofer and his disciples in the yeshiva of Pressburg, the province's largest city. However, they were mostly more moderate and educated than the Unterlander, and the differences between Neo-Orthodox and Ultra-Orthodox in the country paralleled geographic ones. While Hasidism was rampant in Unterland, it had never reached the northwest. During the 19th century, Hungarian Jews were roughly divided into three cultural groups: the Magyarized, Hungarian-speaking and heavily Neolog ones in the center of the kingdom; the modern Orthodox, non-Hasidic, German-speaking Oberlander; and the Unterlander, who were strongly influenced by Hasidism.

The Oberlander shared a common dialect of Western Yiddish, mixed with Hungarian and Slovak vocabulary. Their customs resembled those of pre-emancipation German Jews, like donning prayer shawls before marriage and laying phylacteries in the intermediate days of the Pilgrimage Festivals. Following World War II, some integrated in East European Ultra-Orthodox groups, while others joined Hungarian Hasidic sects like Satmar, Nitra, Vien, Puppa, and Kashou. Several congregations that self-identify as Oberlander and adhere to such customs are present in Israel, New York, in London's Stamford Hill, and in Antwerp.

== See also ==
- History of the Jews in Slovakia
- History of the Jews in Hungary
- Yekke
