= Unterlander Jews =

Unterlander Jews (Yiddish: אונטערלאנד, romanized: Unterland, lit. 'Lowland'; Hebrew: גליל תחתון, romanized: Galil Takhton, lit. 'Lower Province') were the Jews who resided in the northeastern regions of the historical Kingdom of Hungary, or present-day eastern Slovakia, Zakarpattia Oblast in Ukraine, and northwestern Transylvania, in Romania. Like their kindred Oberlander Jews, the term is a uniquely Jewish one, and is not related to "Lower Hungary". Unterland, or "Lowland", was named so by the Oberlander, in spite of being topographically higher: It served to reflect the scorn of the educated westerners to their poor and unacculturated brethren.

Refugees from the 1648 Khmelnytsky Uprising were the first Jews to settle in these regions. However, the vast emigration from adjacent Galicia, following its annexation by Empress Maria Theresa in 1772, shaped the character of the Unterlander, in addition to the area's backwardness. Throughout the 19th century, the northeast remained under-developed by any parameter. While hundreds of modern Jewish schools, teaching in German, were established by the authorities in 1850, there were only 8 in the entire Kaschau school district, which covered most of Unterland. The linguistic shift from Yiddish to vernacular, which was over in the rest of Hungary by the mid-19th century, was little felt in the province. Other Hungarian Jews derisively called them "Finaks" or "Fins", based on their pronunciation of the phrase "Von [fin in Unterland accent] Wo bist du?" ("From where are you?"); In Fatelessness, Imre Kertész recalled the Yiddish-speaking, devout "Fins" in Auschwitz. The boundary which separated Unterland from the rest of Hungarian Jewry ran between the Tatra Mountains and Kolozsvár (present-day Cluj-Napoca). It paralleled the linguistic demarcation line of Western and Middle Yiddish. While the locals' dialect resembled the Galician one, it was laced with Hungarian vocabulary, and more influenced by German grammar. Its sibboleth was the pronunciation of R as an Apical consonant. Unterland Yiddish is conserved today mainly by the Satmar Hasidim's educational network.

The influence of Hasidism was strong in the region, though its adherents never constituted a majority. They were known as "Sephardim", owing to their different prayer rite, while the non-Hasidim were called "Ashkenazim" in Hungary. Many of the locals belonged to Hasidic sects from outside the region, like Belz or Vizhnitz. Later on, native courts sprang up in Unterland, mainly Kaliv, Sighet-Satmar, Munkatsch, and Spinka. While there were tensions between the Hasidim and the Ashkenazim, they never reached the levels of hostility which characterized the Lithuanian Misnagdim, both due to the movement's local nature and the lack of opposition from Hungary's most important rabbi, Moses Sofer. He did not approve of the sects, but refrained from action. In the 19th century, any discord between Sofer's disciples and the Hasidic rebbes was marginalized by the need to oppose the progressive and modernized Neologs. The Unterlander, who were poor and traditionalist, had no inclination toward Neology: Only two such communities existed in the region, in Kassa (present-day Košice) and Ungvár (present-day Uzhhorod), the largest cities.
