= Jonah Teomim-Frankel =

Rabbi

Rabbi Jonah Teomim-Frankel, sometimes written as Jonah Teomim Frankel (1595-1669) was author of the book Kikayon deYona. The word "tə'omim" (תְּאוֹמִים) means "twins".

== Biography ==
He was the son of Reb Yeshia Teumim. He led various communities as both a Posek and Rosh Yeshiva throughout Poland and Lithuania.

He served the Jewish community of Metz, France.

He died on the 15th of Nissan, and was buried in the famous Jewish cemetery of Metz. His grandson was Rabbi Baruch Fränkel-Teomim.

== Kikayon DeYona ==
He is best known for authoring Kikayon DeYona, a commentary on the Talmud, Rashi, Tosfos, Maharshal, and Maharsha to various tractates. The commentary was recently re-printed in 1958 in Mount Kisco, New York by the Nitra yeshiva (formerly from Slovakia before the Holocaust) with footnotes and glosses by Rabbi Chaim Michael Dov Weissmandl.
