= Solomon Schonfeld =

British Rabbi honoured as a British Hero of the Holocaust (1912–1984)

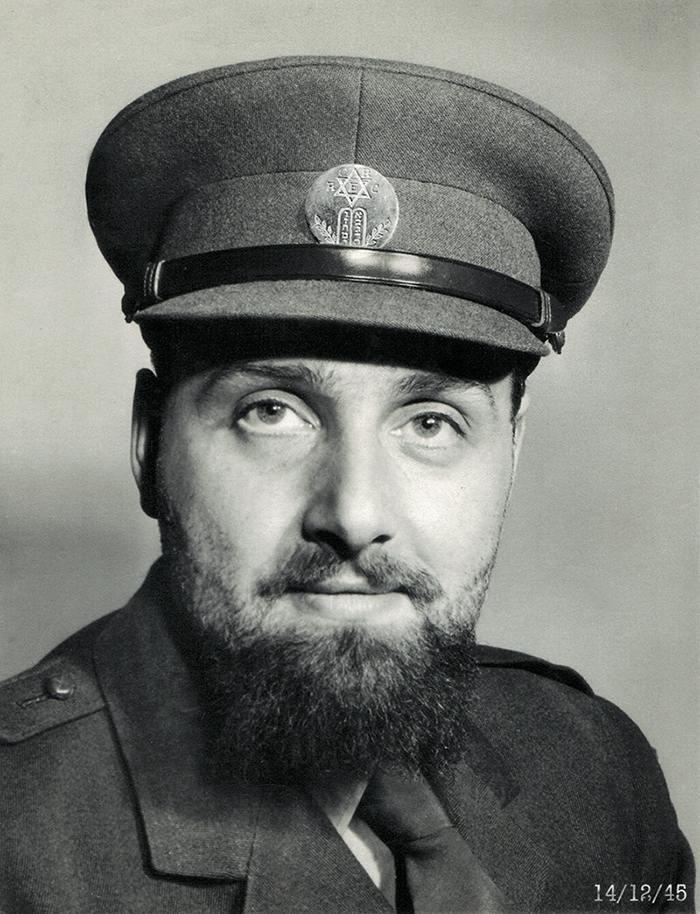
Solomon Schonfeld in his self-made military uniform for his 1946 trip to Auschwitz and Bergen-Belsen concentration camps to help survivors

Solomon Schonfeld (21 February 1912 – 6 February 1984) was a British rabbi who was honoured as a British Hero of the Holocaust for saving the lives of thousands of Jews.

== Early life and career ==
Solomon Schonfeld was the second son of Rachel Leah and Rabbi Victor (Avigdor) Schonfeld (né Schönfeld), one of seven children. His family home was at 73 Shepherd's Hill, Highgate, London, and he was educated at Highbury County School and attended Hebrew classes. His family was originally from Hungary.

Schonfeld studied at the yeshiva in Nyitra, Austria-Hungary (now Nitra, Slovakia), for a doctorate at the University of Königsberg, East Prussia. In Nitra he became the student and lifelong friend of Rabbi Michoel Ber Weissmandl, who acted as his inspiration in his rescue work.

In 1933 he succeeded his father as the rabbi of the Adath Yisroel Synagogue in North London, and as principal of the fledgling Jewish Secondary School. He was the Presiding Rabbi of the Union of Orthodox Hebrew Congregations and president of the National Council for Jewish Religious Day Schools in Great Britain.

When the scale of rescue work needed became apparent in the 1930s, he became the executive director of the Chief Rabbi's Religious Emergency Council, formed under the auspices of his future father-in-law, Chief Rabbi Joseph Hertz, in 1938. He personally rescued many thousands of Jews from Nazi forces in Central and Eastern Europe during the years 1938–1948. He felt Zionism had aided the Nazi regime's persecution of Jews.

In 1940, he married Judith Helen Hertz, daughter of the Chief Rabbi Joseph Hertz. They had three sons.

== During the Holocaust ==
Schonfeld personally rescued thousands of Jews. His rescue efforts were inspired by his teacher at the Nitra Yeshivah, Rabbi Michael Ber Weissmandl. This explains, in part, some of his daring and innovative rescue styles. His rescue activities were under auspices of the Chief Rabbi's Religious Emergency Council, which he created with approval of Chief Rabbi Hertz, his father-in-law.

In the autumn of 1938, following Kristallnacht, Julius Steinfeld, a communal leader in Austria, called Rabbi Schonfeld, pleading with him to assemble a children's transport to England for Vienna's Orthodox Jewish youth. Rabbi Schonfeld met with Yaakov Rosenheim and Harry Goodman, president and secretary of World Agudath Israel respectively, but even before they could decide on a strategy, he boarded a train to Vienna. Rabbi Schonfeld helped Steinfeld organize a Kindertransport of close to 300 Orthodox Jewish youngsters, providing the British government with his personal guarantee in order to secure their entry.

He saved large numbers of Jews with South American protection papers. He brought over to England several thousand young people, rabbis, teachers, ritual slaughterers and other religious functionaries. He provided them with kosher homes, Jewish education and jobs.

Schonfeld also initiated major rescue initiatives. In late summer 1942 he convinced the Colonial Office to allow Jews to find safe haven in Mauritius. In December 1942 he discussed his ideas about rescue with a number of prominent churchmen and Members of Parliament, and organized parliamentary support for a motion that asked the government to make a declaration along the following lines:

"That in view of the massacres and starvation of Jews and others in enemy and enemy-occupied countries, this House asks H. M. Government, following the United Nations Declaration read to both Houses of Parliament on 17th December, 1942, and in consultation with the Dominion Governments and the Government of India, to declare its readiness to find temporary refuge in its own territories or in territories under its control for endangered persons who are able to leave those countries; to appeal to the Governments of countries bordering on enemy and enemy-occupied countries to allow temporary asylum and transit facilities for such persons; to offer to those Governments, so far as practicable, such help as may be needed to facilitate their co-operation; and to invite the other Allied Governments to consider similar action."

Within ten days, two Archbishops, eight Peers, four Bishops, the Episcopate of England and Wales and 48 members of all parties signed the notice of meeting to consider the Motion. Eventually the number of members of Parliament in support of the motion rose to 177.

In January 1943 Schonfeld worked with Eleanor Rathbone to devise a practical rescue plan, but they then encountered Zionist opposition. The Parliamentary motion had omitted Palestine as a haven, and was therefore vocally opposed as was the case with the Mauritius initiatives.

He assumed that if he owned an island he is free to invite Jews who can escape from the continent to stay there even for extended periods. He got positive response from the Colonial Office, raised £10,000 and purchased Stranger's Cey, an island in the British Bahamas. Later a different Colonial Office department countered the initial support for the plan.

Schonfeld considered as another failure his unsuccessful request to the British government to heed Rabbi Weissmandl's plea to bomb the railway tracks to Auschwitz and possibly the crematoria.

After the war he went to liberated Europe (e.g. Poland) to bring children who had been hidden by locals to England, help and serve the survivors in displaced persons camps in Germany.

== After World War II ==
In 1946, after the Allied victory, he went with a convey of lorries to Auschwitz and Bergen-Belsen concentration camps to help survivors move to fledgling communities. He travelled in an Austin 7 car with armed soldiers for protection. He created and wore a military style uniform to give the impression he was an army officer.

He founded the Hasmonean High School and the other schools that formed the Jewish Secondary Schools Movement.

== Family life ==
Schonfeld was the son of Avigdor (Victor) Schonfeld, rabbi of the Adath Yisroel Synagogue and founder and principal of what became known as the Avigdor School (posthumously named in his honour). In 1940 he married Judith Hertz, daughter of the Chief Rabbi Joseph Hertz, with whom he had three sons between 1940 and 1951. They lived in Highgate, north London.

One of the sons, Victor, died in May 2022.

== Death ==
Schonfeld died in 1984 of a long-term brain tumour. He was posthumously given the British Hero of the Holocaust award in 2013.

== Recorded talks, statements and music ==
- Professor David Kranzler Interview with Rabbi Solomon Schonfeld (Holocaust historian. Interview in London)
- Professor David Kranzler. Rabbi Solomon Schonfeld
- Rabbi Dr. Norman Lamm (Chancellor of Yeshiva University, New York). Beacons in the Dark
- Professor MP Irwin Cotler (MP in Canada). Beacons in the Dark
- The Rescuers song by David Ben Reuven

== Sources ==
- Tomlin, Chanan (2006). Protest and Prayer. Oxford: Peter Lang.
- Kranzler, David (2003). Holocaust Hero: the Untold Story of Solomon Schonfeld, the British Rabbi Who Saved Thousands of Jews During the Holocaust.
- Kranzler, David. "Three who tried to stop the Holocaust".
- Barnett, Barbara (2012). The Hide-and-Seek Children: Recollections of Jewish Survivors from Slovakia. ISBN 9781905021109.
- "Government honours Rabbi Dr Solomon Schonfeld for saving 3,500 lives in Holocaust".
- "Bending the rules: The unsung hero Rabbi Solomon Schonfeld".
