= Baruch Fränkel-Teomim =

19th-century Moravian rabbi

Baruch ben Yehoshua Yechezkel Feivel Frankel-Te'omim, Boruch Frankel Thumim (1760–1828) was a rabbi, Talmudist at Vishnitsa, Austrian Galicia, and at Leipnik, Moravia, during the first half of the 19th century.

== Biography ==
He was the grandson of Aryeh Löb ben Joshua Feiwel Te'omim and the grandson of Rabbi Jonah Teomim Frankel (the "Kikayon Deyona"). The word "tə'omim" (תְּאוֹמִים) means "twins". His daughter married Rabbi Chaim Halberstam, the Sanzer Rebbe.

== Published works ==
He is best known for his work, Baruch Taam (ברוך טעם).
