= Recha Sternbuch =

Swiss major Holocaust-era Jewish rescuer (1905–1971)

- Born: Recha Rottenberg; March 15, 1905; Wadowice, Poland
- Died: February 6, 1971 (aged 65); Montreux, Switzerland
- Spouse: Yitzchak Sternbuch
- Parent(s): Markus Rottenberg and Sara Hendel Friedman
- Family: Chaim Yaakov Rottenberg (brother)

Recha Sternbuch (née Rottenberg; 1905–1971) was a Swiss Orthodox Jewish woman who was a major Holocaust-era Jewish rescuer.

== Biography ==
=== Origins ===
Born in Wadowice, near Kraków, Poland in 1905, Recha Sternbuch moved to St. Gallen in 1928 with her husband, Yitzchak Sternbuch, a businessman in Montreux, Switzerland. Moving to St. Gallen, her husband's hometown, was a culture shock for Recha, who had grown up in a religious community and was unprepared for the small community of Swiss Jews who were more liberal than the community she had been raised in.

Her father was Markus Rottenberg, a prominent Rabbi and scholar who was widely known in Europe. Rottenberg in 1912 had moved to Antwerp from Poland with his family, including 7-year old Recha, to become Chief Rabbi for the city's Haredi community, per a request from the religious leaders of Antwerp's growing Jewish population for a Rabbi who would preserve the religious traditions of Antwerp's Jewish community.

There was no opportunity for formal religious education in her community and no Jewish schools for young girls in Belgium, so she attended public school, where she learned French. At home with her family she spoke German. Her home was a meeting place for community scholars and she informally continued to learn from these events where her father would interpret the midrash. As a teenager, she even participated in some discussions herself, to the surprise of visitors, who often traveled a long way to seek her father's council.

Her husband moved to Switzerland when he was 10 years old with his family from the United States. The Sternbuchs had moved to the US after the Kishinev pogrom but had found life in New York City difficult as newly arrived immigrants. When the Sternbuchs moved to Basel, Isaac's father became a community leader for newly arriving Orthodox, in a city where Jews were mostly assimilated and had even hosted the secular Theodor Herzl at the First Zionist Congress. In this aspect, Isaac's childhood in Switzerland shared similarity with Recha's in Belgium, as his home became a meeting point for religious men and scholars to meet with his father. In fact, Abraham Isaac Kook, one of the founders of religious Zionism, was staying with the Sternbuchs in 1914 when World War I started, an experience which likely influenced the Sternbuch family's views on Zionism. Unable to find a wife in the mostly assimilated Swiss-Jewish community, Isaac met Recha after he heard the daughter of a great Rabbi was seeking a marriage.

=== Rescue efforts ===
She was an Orthodox woman, with children, and pregnant when she spent nights in the forested region by the Austrian border attempting to smuggle refugees while trying to evade Swiss border guards who had orders to turn back anyone over sixteen and under sixty. She worked with a Swiss police captain, Paul Grüninger, who in 1938 helped her smuggle over 800 refugees into Switzerland.

After a Jewish leader in Switzerland informed on them, Recha Sternbuch was arrested and jailed and she lost her fetus. Grüninger lost his job and pension for his help to Jews and was later helped by the Sternbuchs.

After her release from prison Recha Sternbuch continued her activism largely alone, and arranged rescue of over 2,000 Jews. At great risk she smuggled forged Swiss visas to many Jews across the German and Austrian borders. Later she obtained Chinese entry visas which enabled their holders to traverse Switzerland and Italy to ports from where they could be smuggled into Palestine.

On the day of her son's Bar-Mitzvah she was informed that some Jews were in danger in Vichy France. Instead of going to the synagogue, she took a train to France on Shabbat and rescued the Jews in danger. (Although travel on Shabbat is forbidden in Judaism, this is not so in cases of Pikuach Nefesh [Hebrew: פיקוח נפש, literally 'endangerment of life'] in which case nearly all Jewish laws are overridden.)

=== Contact with foreign officials ===
She and her husband had access to the Free Polish diplomatic pouch and were able to send coded cables to contacts in Va’ad Hatzalah (Rescue Committee) in the United States and Turkey. One important use of this channel was the Sternbuchs alerting the New York branch of Va’ad Hatzalah, on 2 September 1942, to the horrors of the Holocaust, a message reinforcing the prior 8 August 1942 Gerhart Riegner cable. It was sent to alert American Jewry to the reality of the Holocaust and led to a meeting of 34 Jewish organizations. The Polish diplomatic pouch was also used to send secret messages, money to Jews in Nazi occupied Europe and as bribes for rescue.

Recha Sternbuch also developed good connections with the Papal Nuncio to Switzerland, Monsignor Philippe Bernardini, dean of the Swiss diplomatic community. He gave her access to Vatican couriers for sending money and messages to Jewish and resistance organizations in Nazi occupied Europe. Recha Sternbuch was among the first to obtain South American identity papers, probably including many from El Salvador’s embassy in Switzerland provided by Jewish First Secretary George Mantello (born as Mandel György in Hungarian part of Romania) at his expense and distribute them to Jews whose life was endangered by the Nazis.

=== Negotiations for release of camp inmates ===
In September 1944 she made contact with Jean Marie Musy, former Swiss president and an acquaintance of Himmler. At Recha Sternbuch’s request Musy, with help from his racing driver son Benoît Musy, drove to Berlin at risk to their lives while the roads were bombed by the allies to negotiate with Himmler, who was willing to release Jews then in concentration camps. According to some he demanded for ransom of one million dollars of that time. According to Holocaust historian Prof. David Kranzler Himmler was told that if the Jews in the camps were unharmed and released as the German army was withdrawing the allies would not shoot the guards, but would try them. On 7 February 1945 Musy delivered the first 1,210 inmates from Theresienstadt and more were promised at two week intervals. Unfortunately this initiative too was apparently obstructed by a Jewish leader in Switzerland.

The Sternbuchs kept negotiating through Musy to the end of the war. There was an agreement to turn over four concentration camps essentially intact to the Allies in return for a USA guarantee to try the camp guards in court as opposed to shooting them on the spot. This saved the lives of large numbers of camp inmates. The Sternbuchs also negotiated the release of thousands of women from the Ravensbrück camp, the release of 15,000 Jews held in Austria, and negotiated with the Nazis. As a result hundreds of Jews from the so-called "Kasztner Train" who had been held for ransom in Bergen-Belsen were released.

=== Role in negotiations with Nazi government ===
In a book published in 2017 entitled In the Name of Humanity: The Secret Deal to End the Holocaust, author Max Wallace presents historical research indicating that Sternbuch had negotiated a deal with Himmler to end the Holocaust. Wallace claims that the role of Sternbuch's father as chief Orthodox rabbi of Antwerp gave Sternbuch important access to major foreign officials. Sternbuch and her husband, Isaac Sternbuch, obtained support from former fascist Swiss President Jean-Marie Musy. According to Wallace, they were able to successfully make Himmler think that Germany should stop killing Jews at Auschwitz, in order to achieve a separate peace with the West, and to get their support to fight Stalin.

Historians had already noted that in late 1944, Himmler had ordered all extermination efforts to cease at Auschwitz; they had assumed this was due to the approach of Soviet troops. Wallace's book cites historical evidence to assert a new finding that Himmler gave this order due to Sternbuch's negotiations.

Some historians and researchers have questioned some of Wallace's findings, and cite other groups who were also negotiating with Himmler, around that time. Wallace's findings are based on research of documents in archives of Yeshiva University, and the Vaad Hatzalah, and the War Refugee Board, and other sources.
