= Ktav Publishing House =

American publishing house

KTAV Publishing House
- Founded: 1921 (104 years ago)
- Founder: Asher and Feiga (Fannie) Scharfstein
- Country of origin: United States
- Headquarters location: Brooklyn, New York
- Key people: Moshe Heller, Levi Rodal
- Nonfiction topics: Judaica and Jewish educational texts
- Fiction genres: Jewish
- Imprints: KTAV, Targum
- Owner(s): Moshe Heller
- Official website: http://www.ktav.com

KTAV Publishing House is a publishing house located in Brooklyn, New York. Ktav means "to write" in Hebrew.

Founded in 1921, it has been among the most notable publishers of Judaica and Jewish educational texts since the middle of the 20th century. In 2004, Ktav was designated a Parents' Choice Award-Winning company.

== History ==
Ktav Publishing House was founded in 1921, and took on its name in the late 1920s when it began publishing notebooks. Sol and Bernie Scharfstein took over Ktav from their parents Asher and Feiga (Fannie), becoming co-owners.

Ktav has over the years been located on Canal Street in Manhattan, in Hoboken, New Jersey, Jersey City, and is currently based in Brooklyn, New York. From 1984 when it moved from Manhattan, and as of 1992, the publishing house was located in Hoboken's industrial district, and was part of a $3-million-a-year publishing and novelty enterprise.

Ktav was as of 1992 run by Sol Scharfstein (who handled the textbook division) and his younger brother Bernie Scharfstein (who handled administrative matters, and oversaw scholarly and theological works).

Ktav in 1992 had a catalog of over 700 titles, and in 2008 its catalog included textbooks, siddurs (Jewish prayer books), scholarly works, and books on spirituality. It published approximately 25 new books every year in 1992, and 15 or 16 new books every year in 2008. Some of Ktav's books were anticipated to sell only a few hundred copies, while others were anticipated to sell in greater numbers.

In 2004, Ktav was designated a Parents' Choice Award-Winning company.

As of 2014, the owner and CEO of Ktav is Moshe Heller, who previously founded Urim Publications in 1997, an independent publishing house based in Jerusalem and New York.
