= Vien (Hasidic community) =

Vien (וויען) is an American Haredi Kehilla (community) originating in present-day Vienna. The name of their congregation is "Kehal Adas Yereim Vien" (קהל עדת יראים וויען) (translation: Congregation of the Reverent, Vienna).

== History ==
Kehal Adas Yereim Vien was formally established on Sunday, May 25, 1941 by Rabbi Klonumos Richter. It traces its origins from a congregation of Oberlander Jews who had moved from Burgenland, Austria (primarily from the "Sheva Kehillos"), Slovakia and Hungary ('The Oberland') to Vienna (headquartering itself in the renowned Schiffschul) and then on to Williamsburg under the leadership of Rabbi Yonasan Steif.

=== Subsequent leaders ===
Rabbi Yonasan Steif died in 1958, and was succeeded by Rabbi Ezriel Yehuda Lebowitz (the Hudhazer Rov). After his death on the first day of Rosh Hashana 1991, he was succeeded as Viener Rav by Rabbi Asher Anshel Katz.

=== Growth of the Kehilla and the transition to Hasidism ===
While the original Viener Kehilla strictly adhered to the customs of Ashkenazi and Oberlander Jews Jews, during the past 40 years there has been a major shift to Hasidic customs among most members of the group due to the proximity and political dominance of Hasidism in their neighborhoods of Williamsburg and Borough Park in Brooklyn, New York.

Some of the most notable differences of the pre-Hasidic Vien were:

- Oberlander style of dress, with men wearing homburg hats or fedoras on weekdays as well as on the Sabbath and holidays. The usual style of dress is more yeshivish than Hasidic in general. It has been remarked by some of the older members of the group that Hasidic dress was not the customary dress for members of their group in Vienna before the war. However, the previous Rav, Rabbi Lebowitz, the Dayan Harav Yosef Steiner and the Chazan Harav Amrom Strasser all did wear a shtreimel, a hat typically worn by Hasidim.
- The Viener Kehilla originally followed the centuries-old customs of the Viennese community, including the Ashkenaz nusach (liturgy) in Davening (prayer), including the recition of most piyyutim and putting on Tefillin on Chol Hamoed. However, as the majority of the members shifted to become Hasidim, the main Viener shul in Wiliamsburg changed its customs and nusach to those of the chasidim, Nusach Sefard. Some of the satellite synagogues of the community (Boro Park, Monsey and Jerusalem) still maintain Nusach Ashkenaz.

Today, while there are still some who follow the old Viener way, the vast majority switched and are similar to other Hasidic sects in every way. Other Hungarian Hasidic sects that underwent very similar transitions include Nitra, Kashau, and Tzehlim.

== Present ==
The current Rav, Rabbi Asher Anshel Katz, took the Viener Kehilla to new heights by expanding all of its existing institutions and by adding many new branches. Prior to his appointment, Rabbi Katz was the Rav of the Szombathely shul in Williamsburg which was established by his late father, Rabbi Yehoshua Katz, who arrived in America after World War II from Szombathely, Hungary.

=== Viener Yeshivah ===
Rabbi Ezriel Yehuda Lebowitz (Hudhazer Rov) founded the Mesivta Nachlas Yakov, which came to be one of the leading yeshivos in the United States, which consistently counted more than 300 rabbinical students.

=== Ivuhem Nehega ===
Ivuhem Nehega is a Torah learning program. All members of the Kehilla learn each day the same page of Gemara, on seder HaShas, and at the end of each month there is an option to take a written test on the pages learned that month. Testing centers are located in Williamsburg; Borough Park; Monsey, New York; Lakewood, New Jersey; and Israel. This program is modeled after the popular program Dirshu. This program brings together all of the members of the Kehilla, young and old in one learning program, with over 600 active participants. The current Rav stated that Ivuhem Nehege is his most precious program of the Kehilla.

Each summer there is a grand Siyum celebration that draws close to one thousand participants.

== Main books of the Viener Rabbonim ==
Rabbi Yonasan Steif wrote numerous books, including:

- Limudei Hashem on Chumash
- Chadushim Gam Yeshunim on the Talmud
- Mitzvas Hashem about trust in God and on the Noahide Laws
- She'eilos U'teshuvos Mahari Steif, responsa
- Mahari Steif on the Haggada shel Pesach and on Chumash Bereishis and Shemos.

Rabbi Ezriel Yehuda Lebowitz wrote:

- Ezer MiYehuda on Chumash Bereishis, Pirkei Avos and more.

Rabbi Asher Katz Wrote:

- Shemen Rosh on Chumash, Pirkei Avos, Derashos (sermons), and on all Jewish holidays (over 30 volumes)
- Nachal Habris on bris Milah
- Otzar HaShabBos on Hilchos Shabbos and more (2 volumes).
