= Yonasan Steif =

Dayan of Budapest, Hungary (1877–1958)

Rabbi Yonasan Steif (Yiddish: יונתן שטייף; August 12, 1877 – August 25, 1958) was a senior dayan of Budapest, Hungary, and later the rabbi of the Vien community in Williamsburg, Brooklyn. Rabbis Moshe Feinstein and Joel Teitelbaum referred to as the gadol hador (spiritual leader of the generation). He was a posek and halachic authority.

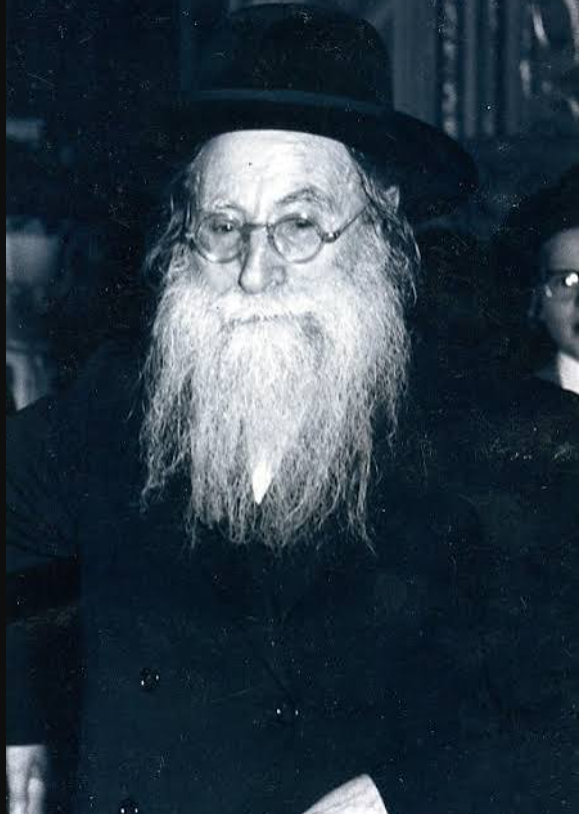
Portrait of Rabbi Steif

He served as senior dayan together with Rabbi Israel Welcz. The Rosh Beth Din was Rabbi Efraim Fishel Zussman Sofer. While Rabbi Steif may have assumed the role of rosh beth din as the year 1944 approached, he was not such for most of his tenure.

== Biography ==
Rabbi Steif was rescued from death in the Holocaust in 1944 as a result of a deal between Rudolph Kastner, and a deputy of Adolf Eichmann. He journeyed on the Kastner train, a special train bound for neutral Switzerland, along with other prominent Jews including the Satmar Rebbe, Rabbi Joel Teitelbaum; the Debreciner Rov, Rabbi Moshe Stern; Adolph Deutsch, head of the Budapest branch of Agudath Israel; and many "ordinary" Jews.

He and his wife Bluma had 2 children; a son named Tzvi Yehuda and a daughter named Esther Shulamis. His son was murdered in the Holocaust together with his young son Aron while trying to escape the Nazis. The rest of his family, including his wife, his daughter-in-law Breindel with her two other sons Sholom Yosef and Michoel, and his daughter Esther with her 2 young sons, were rescued with Rabbi Steif, on the Kastner train. His son-in-law Aron Bleier (Esther's husband) was in the concentration camps at the time but miraculously survived and was re-united with the family after the war. A third son was born to them in 1950.

He resettled and was appointed as rabbi of Kehal Adas Yereim in Williamsburg, Brooklyn, New York, which had been founded by Orthodox Jews who came from Vienna living in New York, and he was known as the Wiener Rov (rabbi of Vienna). He was a major Posek, he wrote halachic responsa, works on the Talmud and two works setting forth the obligations of gentiles, one called Sefer Mitsvos Ha-Shem, "The Book of God's Commandments".A number of other works were published later, and are still being worked on today.

He died at Montefiore Hospital in The Bronx, New York on August 25, 1958.
