= Kashau (Hasidic dynasty) =

Slovak Hasidic dynasty

Kashau (קאשוי) is a hasidic dynasty, named after Kassa (Košice), the town where it originated. Kashau has institutions in Williamsburg, Monsey, and Bedford Hills in New York State.

== Rebbes ==
=== Refuel Blum ===
The dynasty's first rebbe, Refuel Blum, was born in the town of Kassa (Kasho), Hungary (today in Slovakia). Before World War II, Blum established a yeshiva in Mihalowitz.

He survived the Holocaust and in the summer of 1945 returned to Kasho.

In 1948 he moved to Brooklyn, New York, and soon afterward he became head of the Tzelemer yeshiva, Arugas Habosem, and founded a Kashau congregation in the Williamsburg section of Brooklyn. After an unsuccessful attempt in 1962 to establish a community in Morris County, N.J. he bought property in Irvington, N.Y. where he reestablished his yeshiva.

In 1977, after a fire destroyed the Irvington property, he bought the Hillcrest Center for Children in Bedford Hills, NY and established Kahal Adas Kasho. The village is known as Kiryas Kashau.

Blum died on March 1, 2005.

=== Eleizer Chaim Blum ===
Blum was born in Kasho. When he was six years old, he and his brother were saved from the Nazis as part of the Kasztner transport.
