= Twersky =

Twersky, Twerski, or Tverski - literally: of / from Tver - is the surname of a pedigree of rebbes in the Chernobyl Hasidic dynasty. It was begun by the Grand Rabbi Menachum Nachum Twerski. People with this name include:

== Twersky ==
- David Twersky (journalist) (1950–2010), journalist
- David Twersky (Skverer Rebbe) (born 1940), spiritual leader of Skverer Hasidim
- Isadore Twersky (1930–1997), scholar of rabbinic literature and Jewish philosophy
- Luzer Twersky (born 1985), American film and television actor
- Mayer Twersky (born 1960), rosh yeshiva (dean) at Rabbi Isaac Elchanan Theological Seminary
- Menachem Nachum Twersky (1730–1797), the rebbe of Chernobyl and early 18th-century founder of the Hasidic Twersky family
- Mordechai Twersky (c. 1770–1837), maggid of Chernobyl, Menachem Nochum's son
- Moshe Twersky (1955?–2014), son of Isadore Twersky, head of the kollel in Yeshiva Toras Moshe, killed in the 2014 Jerusalem synagogue attack
- Shmuel Abba Twersky (1872–1947), Makarover rebbe of Winnipeg, Canada
- Yakov Yosef Twersky (1899–1968), Grand Rabbi and spiritual leader of the village of New Square, New York

== Twerski ==
- Aaron Twerski (born 1939), American lawyer and the Irwin and Jill Cohen Professor of Law at Brooklyn Law School, former dean and professor of tort law at Hofstra University School of Law
- Aaron Twerski of Chernobyl (1784–1871), Hasidic rabbi
- Abraham J. Twerski (1930–2021), Hasidic rabbi and psychiatrist
- Michel Twerski (born 1939), Hasidic rabbi and composer

== Tversky ==
- Amos Tversky (1937–1996), cognitive and mathematical psychologist
- Barbara Tversky, American cognitive psychologist
