= Baal Shem Tov family tree =

Rabbinical lineage

The following charts illustrate the family of Rabbi Yisrael Baal Shem Tov, the founder of Hasidic Judaism.

The first chart shows the Baal Shem Tov's close family: his closest relatives, by blood and by marriage. This is meant to clarify the various family relations mentioned in the Baal Shem Tov's biography.

The second chart shows his descendants to the fourth generation.

The Baal Shem Tov did not found a Hasidic dynasty proper, as his immediate successor was his student, Rabbi Dov Ber of Mezeritch, and not any of his descendants. Even so, the descendants of the Baal Shem Tov were revered. As recorded in the early Hasidic work Mekor Boruch (first published in 1880 from handwritten manuscripts), at the time of the Baal Shem Tov's death, Rabbi Pinchas of Korets and Rabbi Jacob Joseph of Polonoye, two of the Baal Shem Tov's closest disciples, reported to the Hasidim that the Baal Shem Tov had designated his grandson Reb Boruch as his successor and instructed Reb Pinchas to take responsibility to carry out those wishes. Reb Boruch was only seven at the time of his grandfather's death, and was raised in Reb Pinchas' home, where the Baal Shem Tov's other close disciples and other leaders of the Hasidic movement visited regularly to check on his progress and assist with his preparation to assume his grandfather's mantle.

Eventually, his grandson R. Baruch of Mezhbuzh established his Hasidic court, and was the first Chassidic Rebbe.

Other descendants became allied by marriage to other powerful Hasidic dynasties (e.g. Chernobyl, Karlin-Stolin), producing many dynasties, including some of the dynasties still active today (e.g. Skver, Vizhnitz). Thus the family of the Baal Shem Tov can be considered a sort of Hasidic dynasty in its own right, and is often treated as such in reference works on Hasidic dynasties where it is sometimes referred to as the Mezhbuzh dynasty. (This term is sometimes used specifically for the dynasty of R. Baruch of Mezhbuzh, see Mezhbizh (Hasidic dynasty), or for an unrelated dynasty from Mezhbuzh: see Apta (Hasidic dynasty).)

R. is an abbreviation for the honorific "Rabbi". It does not necessarily indicate that the subject was a Rabbi. A rebbe is the spiritual leader of a Hasidic group or community.

== Close family of the Baal Shem Tov ==
Eliezer	Sara	R. Efrayim (Brody)
(i) ?	R. Yisrael; Baal Shem Tov	(ii); Chana	R. Gershon of Kitov
R. Yechiel	Odl	(i) ?	R. Tsvi	(ii); Beila

== Descendants of the Baal Shem Tov ==
- R. Yisrael Baal Shem Tov (18 Elul 5458 [25 August 1698] or c. 1690/1695 – 6 Sivan 5520 [21 May 1760])
  For more biographical details, see Baal Shem Tov
  Married (i) ? (died without issue), (ii) Chana
  - R. Tsvi Hirsh of Pinsk (? – 7 Tevet 5540 [16 December 1779])
    Married (i) ? (mother of R. Aharon, R. Dov Ber and Sheina Rachel), (ii) Beila (mother of R. Yisrael and Sara Reizel), daughter of R. Shmuel Chosid (i.e. the Pious) of Pinsk.
    Tsvi Hirsh lived in Mezhibuzh during his father's lifetime, and some time after, until his first wife's death. According to some traditions, he succeeded his father as the leader of united Hasidic Judaism before stepping down in favor of R. Dov Ber of Mezeritch. Upon marrying Beila, he moved to Pinsk, where he was a rebbe to a small following.
    - R. Aharon of Titiov (? – 15 Tevet c.1808/1818), called Reb Orale. Rebbe in Kostantin, Titiov and Pavilitsh. Oldest grandson of the Baal Shem Tov.
      - Sima Chusha
        Married (i) R. Tsvi of Korstshov (grandson of R. Nochum of Tshernobl), (ii) her cousin, R. Boruch of Mezhibuzh (see below)
        Descendants: the Chernobyl branch of the Chernobyl dynasty, including the Belz (specifically R. Aharon of Belz), Chortkov, Machnovka, Skver, Faltichan, and Vizhnitz dynasties.
      - R. Tsvi Hirsh (Hershel) of Skver. Rebbe in Skver.
        Descendants: the Skver and Chernobyl dynasties
      - R. Avraham of Skver
        His father died when he was a child, and he was raised by his sister Sima Chusha.
        Descendants: the Savran dynasty
      - [R. Naftali]
      - [?
        married R. Yaakov]
    - R. Dov Ber of Ulanov. Rebbe in Ulanov.
      - R. Tsvi Hirsh of Tshudnov (? – c.1848). Rebbe in Tshudnov.
      - Sima
        Married (i) ?, (ii) R. Tsvi Menachem Mendel Auerbach, rebbe of Dinovits, son of the rebbe R. Zusha of Anipoli
        Descendants: the Hornsteipl, Satmar and Bobov dynasties.
    - Sheina Rachel
      Married R. Yaakov of Karlin and Tiberias (? – 21 Kislev 5594 [3 December 1833]), called Reb Yankele Moneles. Son of R. Menachem Mon (Monele) of Karlin, a disciple of R. Dov Ber of Mezeritch and uncle (and foster-father) of R. Aharon "the Great" of Karlin
      She took kvitelech in the manner of a rebbe.
      - R. Naftali Tsvi Hirsh of Karlin and Tiberias. Called Reb Hershel dem Baal Shems (R. Hershel, the Baal Shem [Tov]'s [descendant]). Spiritual and secular leader of the Hasidic community (in particular, the Karlin community) of Tiberias (? – 27 Elul 5624 [28 September 1864])
        Married Sara Sosha, daughter of R. Yisrael, the rabbi and rebbe of Pikov, son of R. Levi Yitzchok of Berditchev.
        Descendants: the Boston dynasty
    - R. Yisroel שותק Shotek i.e. "the Silent" of Chernobyl, a close associate of R. Mordechai of Chernobyl.
      Died in Yarovitsh near Homel and was buried there.
    - Sara Reizel
      Married R. Moshe Shimon Volf Auerbach (? – 24 Tevet 5597 [1 January 1837]) of Safed, son of R. Avraham Dov Auerbach, rabbi of Chmielnik, and grandson of R. Yaakov Yosef of Polnoe, one of the most prominent disciples of the Baal Shem Tov. Died in the Galilee earthquake of 1837.
      - ?
        Married R. Dov Ber of Chvastov, great-grandson of R. Dov Ber of Mezeritch and grandson of Rabbi Shlomo of Karlin.
      - Tsivya
        Married R. Yehuda Arye, son of R. Menahem Mendel Tsauzmir the rabbi of Mohliv.
      - R. Yisrael of Lodezhin.
  - Odl (? – c. 1772 or c. 1787)
    Married R. Yechiel of Medzhybizh, son of R. Baruch.
    - R. Moshe Chaim Ephraim of Sudilkov (c. 1748 – 17 Iyar 5560 [12 May 1800]). Rebbe of Sudilkov and Mezhibuzh.
    - R. Boruch of Mezhibuzh (c. 1753 – 18 Kislev 5572 [4 December 1811]). Rebbe of Tultshin and Mezhibuzh.
      Married (i) ? (daughter of R. Tovia Katskes of Ostroh), (ii) Sima Chusha, daughter of R. Aharon of Titiov, his cousin (see above). All his children are from his first marriage.
    - Feiga (? – before c. 1802)
      Married R. Simcha (c. 1763 – before c. 1802), son of R. Nachman, rebbe of Horodenka, a disciple of the Baal Shem Tov.
      - R. Nachman of Breslov (1772–1810). Rebbe of Breslov those paternal ancestry came from (According to Jewish tradition), the Maharal's family descended patrilineally from the Babylonian Exilarchs (during the era of the geonim) and therefore also from the Davidic dynasty.
        Married (i) Sosia (mother of his children), (ii) ?, daughter of R. Yehezkel Trachtenberg of Brody.
      - R. Yisrael der Toyter (or Hebrew: מת Met) i.e. "The Dead"
        Married a granddaughter of R. Moshe of Kitov, an early disciple of the Baal Shem Tov.
      - R. Yechiel Tsvi (? – c. 1812)
      - Perl
        Married R. Pinhas Meir
        They went to Safed.

== Bibliography ==
- Alfasi, Yitsḥaḳ (1995–1998). החסידות מדור לדור ha-Ḥasidut mi-dor le-dor [Hasidism from generation to generation] (in Hebrew). Jerusalem: Mekhon Daʻat Yosef – via Otzar HaHochma (subscription required). pp. 47–53. LCCN 95828260.
- Brim, M. S., "כתר שם טוב" "Keter Shem Tov" (a family tree of the descendants of the Baal Shem Tov to the fifth generation, in two parts), in היכל הבעש"ט Heichal Habesht 23, pp. 164–182, and 24, pp. 157–272. Extended to the sixth and seventh generations in Heichal Habesht 26, 29–30. ISSN 1545-8423
- Grosman, Leṿi (1943). שם ושארית Shem u-sheʹerit (in Hebrew). Tel Aviv: Betsal'el. pp. 58–60. OCLC 36052853.
- Hager, Rabbi Yosef Yeruḥam Fishl (2000). אבן ישראל Even Yisraʼel (in Hebrew). Jerusalem: Maʻyan ha-Ḥasidut – via Otzar HaHochma (subscription required). LCCN 2001321344.
- Horowitz, Raichel (1996). The Bostoner Rebbetzin remembers. Brooklyn, New York: Mesorah Publications. ISBN 978-0-89906-592-2.
- Rabinowicz, Tzvi M. (1996). The Encyclopedia of Hasidism. Northvale, New Jersey: Jason Aronson. ISBN 978-1-56821-123-7.
- Vekshtein, N. A., "נהר יוצא ממעזיבוז" "Nahar Yotzei mi-Mezhibuzh", (a ten-part series on the descendants of the Baal Shem Tov, based on the above-mentioned Shem u-sheʼerit, ha-Hasidut mi-dor le-dor, "Keter Shem Tov" and Even Yisraʼel, with comments and additions), in "Vayityaldu" #30–38 and #41.
- Vekshtein, N. A., "ויתילדו" "Vayityaldu" (a genealogical column in the Hebrew edition of Hamodia) #85 (can be accessed online at Yuchasin - Vayityaldu 85 (archive.org link))
