= Mordechai Hager =

Grand Rabbi of Vizhnitz

Admor Rabbi Mordechai Hager
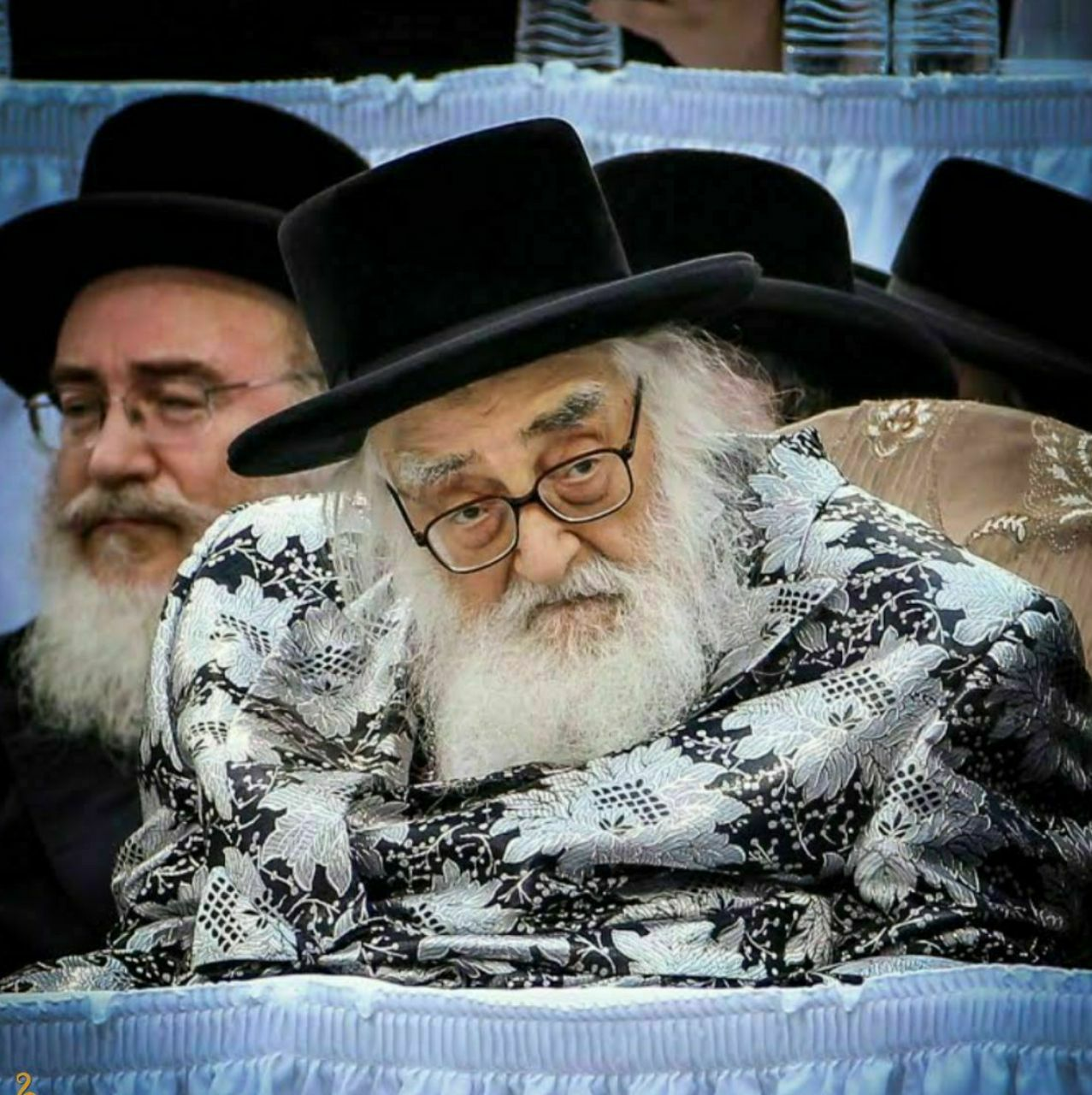

Personal life
- Born: 14 July 1922 (18 Tammuz 5682) Oradea, Kingdom of Romania
- Died: 16 March 2018 (aged 95) (29 Adar 5778) Mount Sinai Hospital, New York City, New York, United States
- Buried: Monsey, New York
- Spouse: Figa Malka Twersky; Sima Mirel Twersky
- Children: 14
- Parent(s): Chaim Meir Hager; Margalia Twersky
- Dynasty: Vizhnitz

Religious life
- Religion: Judaism

Jewish leader
- Position: Rabbi
- Synagogue: Levush Mordechai Vznitz Monsey
- Yeshiva: Gibbers, Kiamesha Lake, New York
- Residence: Monsey
- Dynasty: Vizhnitz

Mordechai Hager (14 July 1922 (18 Tammuz 5682) – 16 March 2018 (29 Adar 5778), Hebrew: מרדכי הגר; Yiddish: האגער) was the rebbe (hereditary rabbinic leader) of the Hasidic sect of Vizhnitz for 46 years.

== Biography ==
=== Early life ===
He was born in Grossverdein to Rabbi Chaim Meir Hager, later the Vizhnitz rebbe, and Margalia, the daughter of Rabbi Ze'ev Twersky, the Admor of Rachmastrivka. His grandfather was the rebbe Yisroel Hager.

At the age of 18 Hager briefly studied in the yeshiva of Yoel Teitelbaum, the Satmar rebbe. He also studied in Pupa under the Pupa rebbe Yosef Greenwald.

Hager and his family managed to escape to Bucharest and thus escaped the Holocaust in Northern Transylvania. In 1945 in Bucharest, he married Figa Malka, the daughter of Yakov Yosef Twersky, the Skverer rebbe. After she died without children, he married her younger sister Sima Mirel and together they had 14 children, 8 sons and 6 daughters.

=== After World War II ===
In 1948, he arrived in the United States with his father-in-law and began serving as a rabbi of Vizhnitz Hassidim in Williamsburg, Brooklyn.

He settled in Monsey, New York.

After his father's death in 1972, his two sons were appointed as rebbes of Vizhnitz as well, Moshe Yehoshua Hager in Israel, and Mordechai in the United States.

He established the Kaser village in Monsey in 1990 so it could build denser housing. He met with US President Jimmy Carter together with rabbis Shlomo Halberstam of Bobov and Moshe Teitelbaum of Satmar.

At the time of his death, he was the oldest Hasidic rabbi in the world. He had about 30,000 followers internationally.

During the last months of his life he was hospitalized at Mount Sinai Hospital in Manhattan, where he died on March 16, 2018 (29 Adar 5778). Tens of thousands attended his funeral. He was buried beside his son in a grave in the Vizhnitz cemetery in Monsey .

== Views ==
He had a world view similar to that of his grandfather, Yisroel Hager (Ahavat Yisrael). During Seudah shlishit, he used to protest against loopholes in religion. For example, he ordered his followers not to carry on Shabbos in Boro Park and Williamsburg, although the local Eiruv was approved by some of the city's rabbis. He objected to eating ice cream at the end of the meal, due to halakhic doubts regarding the laws of the brachos before enjoyment and also for the purpose of celibacy of the pleasures of this world which he believed to be worthy of the "servant of God". He objected to being photographed, (Note: This is described in the book "Yaaros Devash" by Rabbi Yehonatan Eibeshitz (19b)) and even appealed to the editorial offices of the ultra-orthodox newspapers not to publish his pictures. In addition to keeping a kosher diet, he was a pescatarian and ovo-lacto-vegetarian for undisclosed reasons. Furthermore, he did not encourage his followers to emulate his pescatarian and ovo-lacto-vegetarian lifestyle.

== Family ==
His wife died about a decade before him. After his death, his seven sons and one grandson (eldest son of his eldest son who had died before him) were appointed to succeed him as rabbis in their respective communities.

- Rabbi Pinchas Shalom (died 17 Sivan 5775 (2015) at age 67), rabbi of Torat Chaim Vizhnitz in Boro Park, was married to Zisel Reizel, daughter of Rebbe Shmuel Zvi Horowitz of Spinka.
  - Rabbi Yaakov Yosef Hager, eldest son of Rabbi Pinchas Shalom, succeeded Rabbi Pinchas Shalom as Rabbi of Vizhnitz in Boro Park, and after Rabbi Mordechai's death, was appointed Rebbe of Vizhnitz in Boro Park. He is married to his cousin, daughter of Rabbi Avraham Dov Twersky, rabbi of the Rachmstrivika community in Monsey.
- Zippora, married to Rabbi Avraham Dov Twersky, rabbi of the Rachmastrivka congregation in Monsey, son of Rabbi Yochanan, Rebbe of Rachmastrivka.
- Rabbi Yisroel, is Rabbi Mordechai's main successor as Rebbe of Vizhnitz in Monsey. Married to Miriam, daughter of Rabbi Eluzer Meisels of Uhel. he objects being photographed just like his father
- Malka Chana Rachel, married to Rabbi Israel Eliezer Fish, the Admor of Bixad in Williamsburg
- Rabbi Menachem Mendel, Admor of Kiamesha Lake in the Catskill Mountains. Previously served as rabbi of the local community of Torat Chaim Vizhnitz, which has about 150 families. He objects to being photographed and considered sharp and has separatist views as his father. Married to his cousin Feiga Shifra, daughter of Rabbi Chai Yitzchak Twersky, the Admor of Rachmastrivka, United States.
- Rabbi Yitzchak Yohanan, Admor of Vizhnitz in Williamsburg, previously served as Rabbi of the local community of Vizhnitz. Married to Chaya Mindel, daughter of Rabbi Moshe of Kiviashd.
- Hinda, married to Rabbi Yossef Benzion Rotenberg, the Admor of Koson in Boro Park.
- Rabbi Eliezer Ze'ev Hager, was crowned Admor of Vizhnitz in Jerusalem, but lives in the United States. Previously served as rabbi of "Torat Chaim Vizhnitz" on Adoniyahu HaCohen Street in Jerusalem. A medical activist and rabbi of a Beit Midrash of the Chassidus in Boro Park. Son-in-law of Rabbi David Twersky, Admor of Skwere in Boro Park. (His son is Isaac Hager.)
- Rabbi David Hager, Admor of Vizhnitz in London. He serves as the Rebbe of Khal Imrei Chaim D'chasidai Viznitz London and the local Vizhnitz community which consists of around 270 families. Married to Chana Miriam, daughter of Rabbi Moshe Taub of Kalov, United States. Like his father-in-law, he is engaged in Orthodox Judaism outreach
- Rabbi Aharon, Admor of Vizhnitz in Montreal. Formerly served as rabbi of the local "Ahavat Yisrael Vizhnitz" congregation. Married to Sarah, daughter of Rabbi Naftali Aryeh Taub of Kaliv, United States.
- Chava Reizel, married to her cousin Rabbi Aharon Menachem Mendel Twersky, son of Rabbi David Twersky, Admor of Skvira.
- Rabbi Baruch Shamshon, Admor of Vizhnitz in Beit Shemesh and Bnei Brak and Rabbi Mordechai's main successor in Israel. Previously served as rabbi of the Vizhnitz community in Beit Shemesh and Rabbi of the Beit Midrash of the Chassidus on Rabbi Meltzer Street in Bnei Brak. Married to Miriam, the daughter of his cousin Rabbi Yisroel Hager, Admor of Vizhnitz in Bnei Brak.
- Golda, married to Rabbi Yitzchak Yechiel Mechl Moskowitz, rabbi of the Shotz community in Monsey, son of Rabbi Yosef Chaim of Shotz in Williamsburg.
- Bracha, married to Nachman Yosef Twersky, son of Rabbi Ze'ev Twersky (head of Yeshivat Maor Einayim and son of Rabbi Yohanan of Rachmastrivka).
