= Hornosteipel (Hasidic dynasty) =

Ukrainian Hasidic dynasty

Hornosteipel (or Hornisteipol) is the name of a Hasidic dynasty founded by Rebbe Yaakov Yisroel Twerski. Hornosteipel (Yiddish: הארנאסטייפל ) is the Yiddish name of Hornostaypil, a town in present-day Ukraine.

It is a branch of the Chernobyl dynasty, descended from the Sanz, and Chabad dynasties dating back to the 18th century.

== Lineage ==
Rebbe Yaakov Yisroel Twerski, founder of the Hornosteipel dynasty, was the third son of the Chernobler Maggid – Rebbe Mordechai Twersky. Rebbe Mordechai's father, Rebbe Menachem Nachum Twersky of Chernobyl (author of Meor Einayim and founder of The Chernobyl Hasidic dynasty), was a disciple of the Baal Shem Tov, the founder of Hasidism. Rebbe Yaakov Yisroel Twerski later moved to the city of Cherkasy, Ukraine, leaving the leadership of the city of Hornostaypil with his grandson, Rebbe Mordechai Dov. The main bases of Hornosteipel Hasidim are in Midwood ("Flatbush"), Milwaukee, and Beitar Illit. There are also communities with direct ties to Hornosteipel in Chicago, Toronto, Baltimore, and Beit Shemesh, Israel. There was formerly a Hornosteipel community in Denver.

Rebbe Yaakov Yisroel had four daughters and no sons.

- Rebbe Yaakov Yisroel Twerski of Cherkas (1794–13 Elul 1876) – son of the Maggid of Chernobyl
  - Rebbe Yosef Yitzchok Schneersohn of Avrutch (1832-18 Kislev 1876) – son of Rebbe Menachem Mendel Schneersohn, of Lubavitch - author of "Tzemach Tzedek", son-in-law of Rebbe Yaakov Yisroel Twerski. he founded his court at the urging of his father-in-law and conducted his court in the Chernobyl tradition.
    - Rebbe Mordechai Dov Twerski of Hornosteipel (1839– 23 Elul 1903), author of "Emek Sheilah" – grandson of the Rebbe Yaakov Yisroel Twerski and great-great-grandson of Rebbe Zishe of Anipoli.
      - Rebbe Chaim Moshe Tzvi Twerski of Hornosteipel-Rachmastrivka (1866– 1933) – son of the Rebbe Mordechai Dov. Son-in-law of Rebbe Nuchum of Rachmastrivka of the Chernobal dynasty
      - Rebbe Ben Tzion Yehuda Leib Twerski of Hornosteipel-USA (1867–28 Shevat 1951) – son and successor of Rebbe Mordechai Dov. He later lived in Antwerp, in Israel, and in Chicago.
        - Rabbi Menachem Nuchim Twerski son of Rebbe Ben Tzion Yehuda Leib (d. 19 Kislev) – son of Rebbe Ben Tzion Yehuda Leib – son-in-law of Rebbe Yosef Zvi Kalish of Skernovitz-Bnei Braq (Vorka dynasty) was very knowledgeable in Torah and chassidus. Young and old would flock to his shul in Tel-Aviv and hear words of Torah and stories of tzadddikim. He wrote a sefer called "Medor L'dor" documenting his pedigree charts, Yichus book and the biography of his ancestors.
        - Rebbe Yaakov Yisroel Twerski of Hornosteipel-Milwaukee (1898–10 Av 1973) – son of Rebbe Ben Tzion Yehuda Leib – son-in-law of Rebbe Ben Zion Halberstam of Bobov.
          - Rebbe Ben-Tzion Chaim Shloime Meshulam Zusia Twerski Rebbe of Hornosteipel-Denver (1923–23 Tishrei 1981) – son of Rebbe Yaakov Yisroel of Milwaukee
            - Rebbe Mordechai Dov Ber Twerski, Rebbe of Hornosteipel-Denver (b. 1949), in Flatbush, Brooklyn – only son of Rebbe Shloime of Denver
            - Rebbe Shulem Shachna Friedman, Rebbe of Hornosteipel-Eretz Yisroel, son-in-law and successor of Rebbe Shloime of Denver. Rebbe of the growing Hornosteipol community in Beitar Illit (formerly in Yerushalayim). Known for his hachnasas orchim (hospitality) and teaching Chassidus of many varieties in both Yiddish and English, as well as helping to bring passion, inspiration, and dedication into the religious lives of his Chasidic followers.
            - Rabbi Amnon Nissan, An Alumnus of Yeshivas Chofetz Chaim and Rebbi in Yeshivas Zichron Aryeh.
          - Rebbe Mordechai Dov Ber Twerski (1924–1998), son of Rebbe Yaakov Yisroel of Milwaukee
          - Rabbi Dr. Abraham J. Twerski, M.D., son of Rebbe Yaakov Yisroel of Milwaukee
          - Rabbi Aaron Twerski, son of Rebbe Yaakov Yisroel of Milwaukee (b. 1939), the Irwin and Jill Cohen Professor of Law at Brooklyn Law School, as well as a former Dean and professor of tort law at Hofstra University School of Law
          - Rebbe Yechiel Michel Twerski of Hornosteipel-Milwaukee (b. 1939) – son of Rebbe Yaakov Yisroel of Milwaukee -He has a devoted following of Chasidim. He and his Rebbitzin Feigy have brought hundreds of Jews back to Judaism. The Rabbi also composed over seventy songs and many can be found on records in Music stores or on twerskitorah.com

== See also ==
- Chernobyl (Hasidic dynasty)
