= Skver (Hasidic dynasty) =

Ukrainian Hasidic dynasty

Skver Hasidic Dynasty
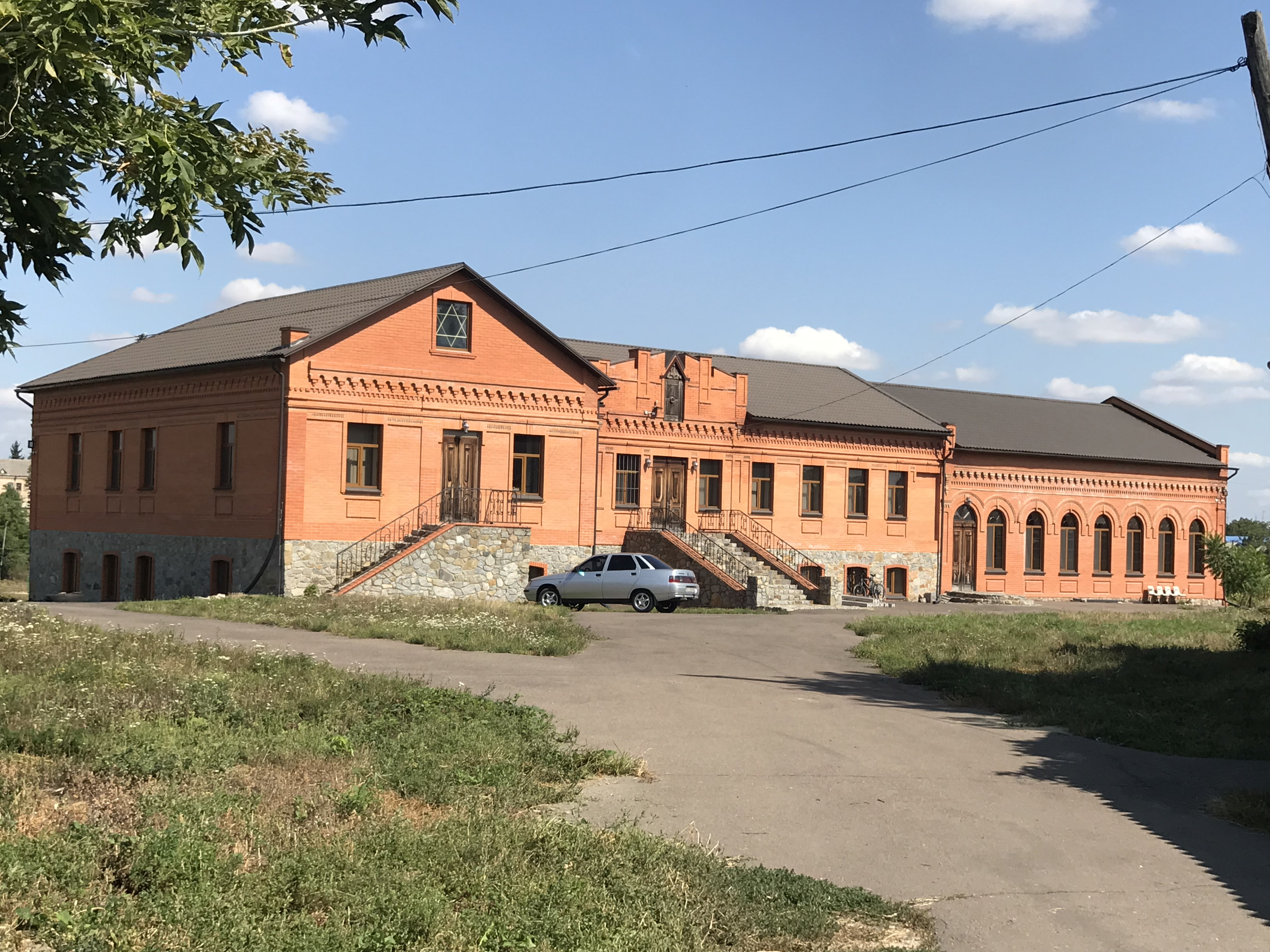
- The Skver synagogue in Skvyra, Ukraine, restored in 2004

Founder
- Yitzchok Twersky

Regions with significant populations
- United States, Israel, Canada, England, Europe

Religions
- Hasidic Judaism

Skver (also Skvir, Skvere, Skwere, or Square; Yiddish: סקװיראָ, romanized: skviro) is a Hasidic dynasty founded by Rebbe Yitzchok Twersky in the city of Skver (known in Yiddish), or Skvyra, in present-day Ukraine during the mid-19th century. Adherents of the rebbes of Skver are known as Skverer Hasidim.

The Skver dynasty is a branch of the Chernobyl dynasty. Its founder, Rebbe Yitzchok, also known as Reb Itzikl, was one of the eight sons of Rabbi Mordechai, the Maggid of Chernobyl. There are three rebbes of the Skverer dynasty:

- David Twersky, who leads the largest and most prominent branch, headquartered in New Square, New York.
- Yechiel Michl Twersky, son of Rebbe David ("Reb Duvid'l") Twersky, who heads the Skver-Boro Park community.
- Yitzchok Twersky, son of Mottel Twersky, who leads the Skver-Flatbush community.

== History ==
The first Rebbe of Skver was Hershele of Skver (Reb Hershele Skverer), a direct descendant of the Baal Shem Tov. When Hershele settled in Skver (Skvira), he was elected to become the town rabbi in the shtutishe shil (Yiddish: שטאטישע שול, "main shul in the city"). Hershele's daughter later married Rabbi Yitzchok Twersky (called Reb Itzikl), the seventh son of Rabbi Mordechai of Chernobyl.

=== Reb Itzikl, founder of the dynasty ===
After Hershele died on Chol Hamoed Succos, 5548 (1788), Itzikl, the seventh son of Mordechai of Chernobyl and Hershele's son-in-law, became the next rabbi of Skver.

Itzikl was married three times. He married his first wife, a granddaughter of Rabbi Yitzchok of Radvil and the Apter Rov, in 1783. They had two sons: Avrohom Yehoshua Heshil of Makhnovka, and Menachum Nochum of Shpikov. His second wife, Chaya Malka, was a daughter of Rabbi Yisroel Friedman of Ruzhin. His third wife, Chana Sima, was the daughter of Rabbi (Tsvi) Hershele of Skver.

There are no published works by Itzikl himself, but a collection of oral teachings called "Yalkut Meorei Or" (among other books) has been published by Skverer Hasidim in recent years under the imprint of Mechon Mishkenos Yakov.

=== Dovidl ===
Itzikl's son by his third wife Chana Sima, Dovidl, succeeded his father as Skverer Rebbe.

In 1919, Dovidl left Skvira for Kiev due to the Bolshevik revolution. He stayed in Kiev until his death (on 15 Kislev 5680) later that year. He left no published works.

== Skver in the U.S.: The New Square Faction ==
=== Reb Yakov Yosef ===
Dovidl's son, Rebbe Yakov Yosef (1899–1968) married Trana, the daughter of Rabbi Pinye of Ustilla and granddaughter of Yissachar Dov Rokeach of the Belz dynasty, in 1925. As a young man, he lived in Belz, and later adopted some of the Belzer customs. A few years later, he set up court in Kalarash, Romania (now Călăraşi, Moldova), and later in Iaşi. After World War II he lived in Bucharest.

In 1948, after surviving the war in Romania, Yakov Yosef came to the United States.

After spending a few years in Williamsburg, Brooklyn, he established a community in what was then rural Rockland County, New York, and named it New Square, where he moved with a few followers in 1956.

=== Rabbi Duvid Twersky ===
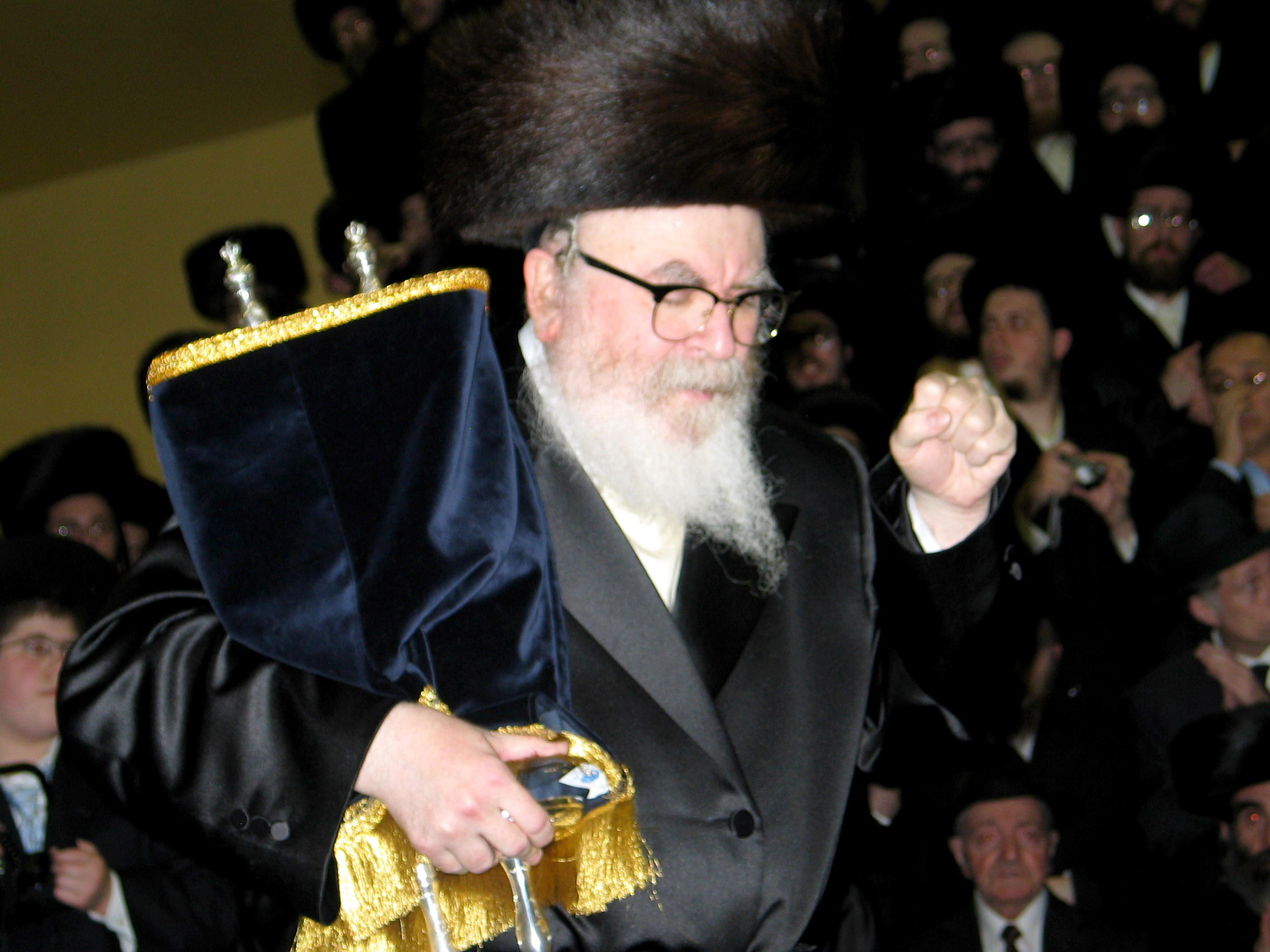
Duvid Twersky, 2008

After Yakov Yosef's death in 1968 his son Duvid Twersky became rebbe. Aside from its headquarters in New Square and its branches in New York City, the group maintains institutions in Canada, England, and Israel. Its school in New Square has close to five-thousand students.

== Skver in the U.S.: Other branches ==
=== Reb Itzikl Skverer of Boro Park ===
Reb Dovidl's eldest son, Rabbi Mordechai Twersky, died in the same year, before his father in Kyiv. During those difficult times, many Jews fled Ukraine and came to America.

Rabbi Mordechai's son, Rabbi Yitzchak Twersky, also left Bessarabia and came to America, arriving in 1923. Eventually, he settled in Borough Park, Brooklyn, and opened his shul on 47th Street, between 13th and 14th Avenue.

Rabbi Yitzchak Twersky died while his son Rabbi Dovid Twersky was still young. Although there were not many vibrant Hasidic communities in America in those days, he was raised in a Hasidic atmosphere in his mother's house where he was guarded against what they considered the "harmful influences" of American culture. Rabbi Dovid Twersky was known for his expertise and influence with many in the medical field, and consequently, was often sought out for advice. He died in 2001, and was succeeded by his son, Rabbi Yechiel Mechel Twersky, the rebbe of Skver-Boro Park.

Institutions of Skver-Boro Park include:

- Bais Yitzchok boys' school (named after Grand Rabbi Yitzchak Twersky).
- Tomer Devorah girls' school.

== Family tree ==
Rabbi Menachem Nachum Twerski of Chernobyl (1730–1797), disciple of the Baal Shem Tov and the Maggid of Mezritch, and author of Me'or Einayim
Rabbi Aaron of Karlin, disciple of the Maggid of Mezritch	Rabbi Dovid Leikes, disciple of the Baal Shem Tov
Chayah Sarah	Rabbi Rabbi Mordechai Twersky, Maggid of Chernobyl	Feiga
Rabbi Aaron of Chernobyl	Rabbi Moshe of Karustshov	Rabbi Yakov Yisroel of Tcherkas	Rabbi Menachem Nachum of Makarov	Rabbi Avraham, the Maggid of Turisk	Rabbi Dovid of Tolna	Rabbi Yitzchak of Skvira	Rabbi Yochanan of Rachmastrivka
Rabbi Avraham Yehoshua Heshel of Makhnifke	Rabbi Menachem Nachum of Shpikov	Rabbi Yisroel	daughter of R' Shlomo Wertheim of Savran	Rabbi Dovid'l (1848–1919) of Skver	daughter of R' Elyokim Getz of Ostraha
Rabbi Mordechai Twerski	Rabbi Shlomo Twersky	Rabbi Nachum Twersky	Rabbi Yitzchak Twersky of Kishinev	Rabbi Yakov Yosef Twersky (1899–1968), previous rebbe of Skver and founder of New Square community
Rabbi Yitschok Twersky of Skver	Rabbi Mordechai Hager, rebbe of Viznitz-Monsey (died 2018)	Rabbi Yitzchak Twersky, rebbe of Rachmastrivka-Borough Park	Rabbi Duvid Twersky (born 1940), present rebbe of Skver and leader of New Square community
Rabbi Dovid Twersky of Skver-Boro Park
Rabbi Yechiel Michl Twersky of Skver-Boro Park

== Dynasty lineage ==
- Grand Rabbi Yisroel Baal Shem Tov — founder of Hasidism.
  - Grand Rabbi Menachem Nachum Twersky of Chernobyl (1730–1797) — author of Meor Einayim and Yesamach Lev; disciple of the Baal Shem Tov.
    - Grand Rabbi Mordechai Twersky (1770–1837) — also known as the Chernobyler Magid (Preacher of Chernobyl); son of the Meor Einayim; author of Keser Torah.
      - Grand Rabbi Yitzchok (Itzikl) Twersky of Skver (1812–1885) — son of the Magid of Chernobyl; son-in-law of Rabbi Tzvi Hirsh of Skver, a patrilineal descendant of the Baal Shem Tov.
        - Grand Rabbi David (Duvidl) Twersky of Skver (1848–1919) — son of Rebbe Itzikl.
          - Grand Rabbi Mordechai Twersky of Skver (1868–1919) — son of Rebbe Duvidl.
            - Grand Rabbi Yitzchak Twersky of Skver-Boro Park (1888–1941) — arrived in America in 1923, son of Rabbi Mordechai.
              - Grand Rabbi David Twersky of Skver-Boro Park (1922–2001) — son of Rabbi Yitzchak.
                - Grand Rabbi Yechiel Michl Twersky — present rebbe of Skver-Boro Park, son of Rabbi David.
                - Grand Rabbi Avroham Yehoshua Heshel Twersky — Head of Skver-Boro Park institutions, son of Rabbi David
          - Grand Rabbi Shlomo Twersky of Skver (1870–1921) — son of Rebbe Duvidl.
            - Grand Rabbi Eluzar Twersky of Faltishan-Skver (1893–1976) — Rebbe of Faltishan (Fălticeni, Romania); son of Rabbi Shlomo; arrived in America in 1947.
              - Grand Rabbi Yisrael Avraham Stein of Faltishan (1915–1989) — Rabbi of Faltishan, and Faltishaner Rebbe in Brooklyn; son-in-law of Rabbi Elazar; arrived in America in 1946.
                - Grand Rabbi Mordechai Stein of Faltishan (1941–2025) — Faltishaner Rabbe; son of Rabbi Yisrael Avraham.
                  - Rabbi Yitzchak Stein of Faltishan (1962–) — Faltishaner Rabbe; son of Rabbi Mordechai.
              - Rabbi Avrom Twersky of Faltishan (ca. 1920-1985) — Rebbe of Faltishan Borough Park; son of Rabbi Eluzer.
                - Grand Rabbi Shulem Meir Twersky — Present Faltishan Borough Park Rebbe; son of Rabbi Avrom.
          - Grand Rabbi Yaakov Yosef Twerski of Skver (1899–1968) — Rebbe of New Square; son of Rabbi Duvidl.
            - Grand Rabbi Duvid Twersky of Skver (1940–) — present Rebbe of New Square and Grand Rabbi of the Skverer Hasidim worldwide; son of Rebbe Yaakov Yosef.

== Literature ==
- Meor Eynayim, by the first rebbe of Chernobyl, Rebbe Menachem Nachum Twersky
- Toldos Yaakov Yosef, by Rabbi Yaakov Yosef Hakohen of Polnoye, disciple of the Baal Shem Tov
- Ohr ha-Chaim ("the light of life"), by Rabbi Haim Ben-Attar, traditionally studied on Friday nights (at the start of the Sabbath).

== See also ==
- List of Hasidic dynasties

== Bibliography ==
- Yachas Chernobyl V'Ruzhin, by David Aaron Twerski of Zhurik
- Reb Itzikl Skverer, by Leibel Surkis, New Square, NY, 1997
- Bikdusha Shel Ma'la, Biography of Rabbi Yakov Yosef (Twerski) of Skver, by Mechon Mishkenos Yakov, 2005
