= David Leykes =

Disciple of the Baal Shem Tov (~1699–1799)

Rabbi David Leykes

Personal life
- Born: 1698/1699
- Died: 10 April 1799 Bar, Russian Empire
- Children: Feiga, Meir, Aryeh, Yosef
- Parents: Israel (father); Leah (mother)

Religious life
- Religion: Judaism

Jewish leader
- Synagogue: Court in Bar, Ukraine

Rabbi David Leykes (Hebrew: דוד לייקס) (1698/1699 – 10 April 1799) was a Hasidic Av Beit Din in the city of Bar and one of the disciples of Baal Shem Tov.

== Biography ==
Leykes was the son of Israel and his wife Leah. His father was a descendant of Judah Loew ben Bezalel. He married twice. The second time was to a woman named Chaya Shintzy when he was over 70 years old. From his second marriage, he had 2 sons and a daughter name Feiga, who, in a second marriage, married Rabbi Mordechai Twersky of Chernobyl. The Baal Shem Tov appointed him head of his congregation. He was a joyful individual who spread good cheer. When his first wife and children died, he rebuked those who attempted to comfort him and continued to maintain a happy disposition. He cried when the Besht died, but allowed himself to mourn only briefly.

He served as a judge in the court of Bar under the rule of Jacob Samson of Shepetovka. Following Yaakov's departure, Leykes was appointed as the Av Beit Din.

Leykes was known to have given the only Haskamah in the Agaret HaKodesh (1793/1794) of Rabbi Menachem Mendel of Vitebsk. Works of his are also featured in the היחס מטשרנוביל ורוז'ין (Connection of Chernobyl and Ruzhyn) and the תיקוני הזבח (Corrections of the Sacrifice) (Odessa 1882).

He died on 10 April 1799 (5 Nissan 5559) at the age of 100. The cemetery where he was buried was destroyed by the Soviet government and was located by Hasid Israel Meir Gabbay who attempted to erect a monument there, but was denied permission by local authority. today, a sign posted on one of the buildings indicates the burial place of the rabbi. According to his tombstone, he promised his descendants that if they visited and prayed at his grave on the Rosh Chodesh of Elul, they would be guaranteed salvation.

== Family ==
The Rabbi's sons are

- Rabbi Meir, who was known as being humble and long-tempered. His son Rabbi David Horodutsky married his cousin Chana Chaya, daughter of Rabbi Mordechai of Chernobyl.
- Rabbi Aryeh Leib
- Rabbi Yosef Barar, immigrated to Eretz Israel and settled in Safed.
- Feiga, who married (in a second pairing) to Rabbi Mordechai of Chernobyl.
  - Their sons were, Rabbi Menachem Nochum Twersky of Makarov, Rabbi Abraham Twersky of Trisk, Rabbi David Twersky of Tolner, Rabbi Yitzhak Twersky of Skver, and Rabbi Yohanan Twersky of Rachmastrivka. and daughters Chana Chaya, wife of Rabbi David Horodutsky, and Scheindel, wife of Rabbi Dov Ber Friedman, son of the Ruzhiner Rebbe.

His grandchildren: Rabbi David of Tolner, as well as his great-grandchildren Rabbi David of Saltipoli, Rabbi David of Squire, and Rabbi David of Makarov were named after him.
