= Abraham J. Twerski =

American rabbi and psychiatrist (1930–2021)

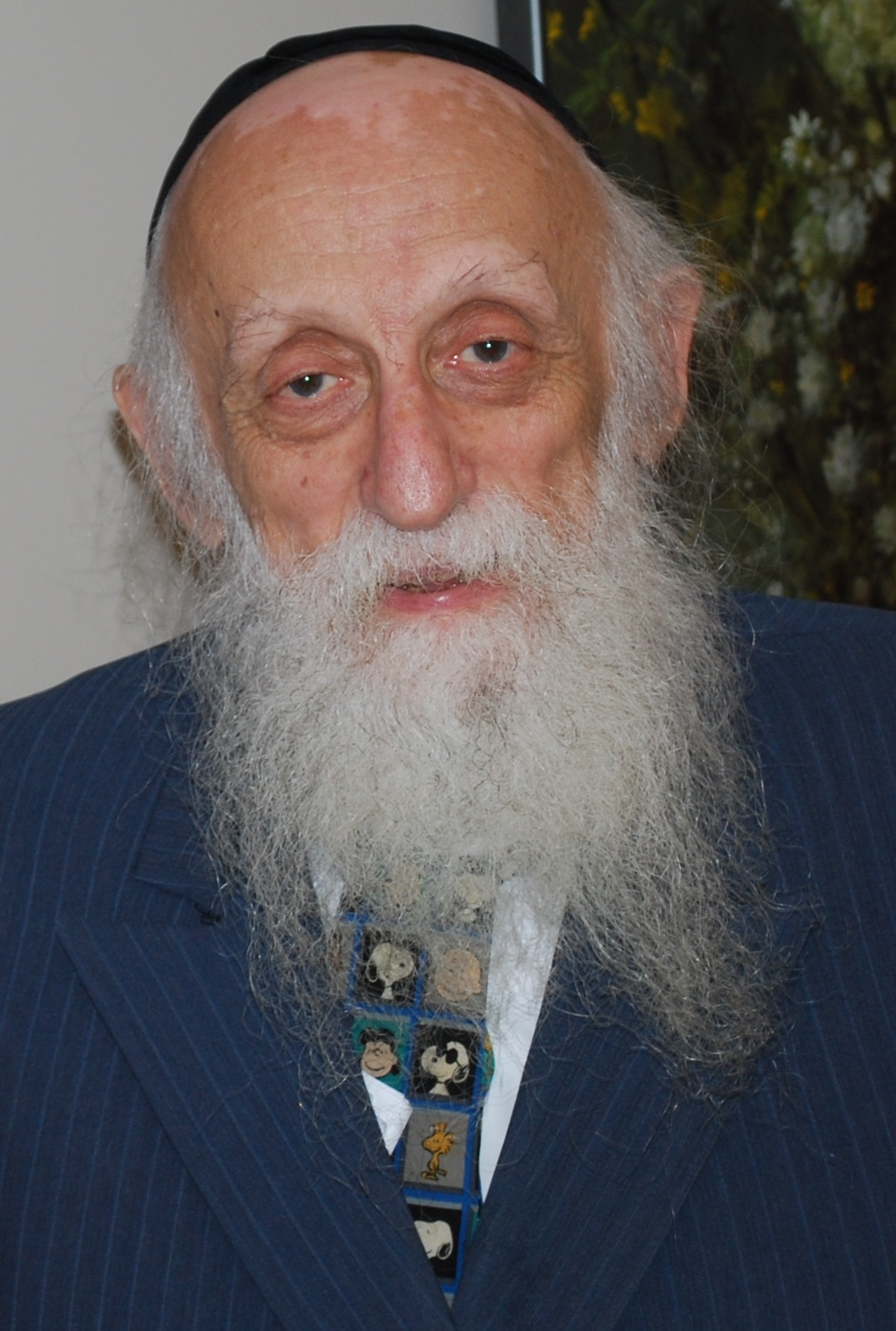
- Twerski in 2011
- Born: Abraham Joshua Heshel Twerski; October 6, 1930; Milwaukee, Wisconsin, U.S.
- Died: January 31, 2021 (aged 90); Hadassah Ein Karem Medical Center; Jerusalem, Israel
- Education: Hebrew Theological College; Marquette University; Medical College of Wisconsin
- Occupation: Psychiatrist
- Spouses: Golda (deceased); Gail Bessler (until his death)
- Children: 4
- Relatives: Aaron Twerski (brother); Michel Twerski (brother)

Abraham Joshua Heshel Twerski (Hebrew: אברהם יהושע העשיל טווערסקי; October 6, 1930 – January 31, 2021) was an American Hasidic rabbi, a scion of the Chernobyl Hasidic dynasty, and a psychiatrist specializing in substance abuse.

== Early life and education ==
Abraham Joshua Twerski was born in Milwaukee, Wisconsin. His parents were Devorah Leah (née Halberstam; 1900–1995), daughter of the second Rebbe of Bobov, and Rabbi Jacob Israel Twerski (1898–1973), who was the rabbi of Beth Jehudah synagogue in Milwaukee. The elder Rabbi Twerski immigrated to America in 1927, and was a descendant of Rabbi Menachem Nachum Twersky, the founder of the Chernobyl Hasidic dynasty, and a student of the Baal Shem Tov. Twerski was the third of five brothers. His two older brothers were Shloime and Motel, and his two younger brothers were twins, Aaron and Michel.

He attended public high school in Milwaukee, and graduated at age 16. He enrolled in the Hebrew Theological College of Chicago (since located in Skokie, Illinois) and was ordained a rabbi in 1951. He worked with his father as assistant rabbi. In 1952, he married Goldie Flusberg. In 1953, Twerski enrolled at Milwaukee's Marquette University. After realizing that congregants were choosing professionals for counseling rather than speaking to him as they did with his father, he decided to enroll at the Medical College of Wisconsin to seek a degree in psychiatry, with his tuition covered by his father and members of his synagogue. in 1959. He received his psychiatric training at the University of Pittsburgh, and spent an additional two years on the staff of a state hospital in Pennsylvania. He was then asked to become the department head of psychiatry at Pittsburgh's St. Francis Hospital.

== Career ==
=== Medicine ===
Rabbi Twerski's medical career includes Gateway Rehabilitation Center, Pittsburgh, which he founded and served as medical director emeritus, clinical director of the Department of Psychiatry at St. Francis Hospital in Pittsburgh, associate professor of psychiatry at the University of Pittsburgh's School of Medicine, and founder of the Shaar Hatikvah rehabilitation center for prisoners in Israel.

=== Rabbinic career ===
Rabbi Twerski was a prolific writer of Jewish books and of shiurim (Torah-themed lectures). He was co-spiritual leader of Congregation Beth Jehudah with his father from ordination until 1959. During this time he composed a melody for the Hebrew verse Psalms 28:9 "Hoshea es Amecha," which became popular in Jewish circles. The song became especially popular in the Lubavitch community, after the Lubavitcher Rebbe sang it at a farbrengen.

==== Rabbi Twerski on Twelve Steps and Jewish ethics ====
Rabbi Twerski's clinical career specialized in alcoholism and addiction. Much of his popular writing concerned self-improvement and ethical behavior. He merged mussar (Jewish ethics and morality movement) with the Twelve-Step Program and ideas from clinical psychology.

Andrew Heinze explains Rabbi Twerski's attraction to the Twelve Steps this way:

The significance of the religious dynamic in Alcoholics Anonymous was captured in Abraham Twerski's comment that he discovered in AA meetings the kind of sincere and even selfless fellow-feeling that was often absent from synagogues. He was moved by the example of men and women who would willingly be awakened in the middle of the night to go out and help a fellow alcoholic. Recovering alcoholics, Twerski observed, "will often exhibit a sense of responsibility far superior to that of the non-alcoholic in relationship to their families, friends, and God."

He was attracted as well by the pragmatism of the Twelve Steps.... [T]he AA system offered a practical non-analytic therapy that resonated with traditional Judaism much more than conventional psychoanalysis did. In treating addicts, Twerski discovered limitations of the psychoanalytic emphasis on understanding the origins of one's behavior. Patients would continue to drink while they inquired with their therapists into the possible reasons for their drinking. The Twelve Step program took the opposite approach, demanding that the person start his or her transformation by stopping the bad behavior. "There is an important similarity between the Torah approach to behavior and the Twelve Step program approach," Twerski realized.

One does not enter into a discussion or argument with the yetzer hara. Whatever reasons you can propose for one position, the yetzer hara will give several logical reasons to the contrary....

Heinze gives the following example of how Rabbi Twerski introduced Twelve Steps, a movement with Christian origins, to the Jewish audience, which, according to Heinze, perceived alcohol addiction as a non-Jewish problem:

....Twerski cleverly presents the theme of alcoholism, not as a modern American phenomenon, but rather as part-and-parcel of rabbinic discourse. He refers to Rabbi Chaim Shmulevitz, who cites Midrash Tanhuma on the drunken man whose family escorts him to witness an obviously drunk and degraded man. To his family's dismay, he bends over the fallen man and whispers in his ear, "My good man, where did you get such fine wine?" To those who would claim that the problem of addictive behavior is secondary or even peripheral to the observant Jew, Twerski answers, "one cannot consider oneself to be truly observant if one neglects mussar." And for Twerski mussar entails dealing with "the psychological mechanism of denial [which] can blind a person to even the most obvious self-destructive behavior."

Rabbi Twerski's reinterpretation of mussar "depends fundamentally on psychological categories in spite of his rejection of psychoanalysis as a therapeutic tool." Heinze writes:

Much as it is impossible for a psychologist to ignore or overlook obvious psychological problems, so Twerski's training in the biochemistry of the brain inevitably led him to abandon the strict and often austere moral economy of traditional mussar. He cannot simply exhort, in the ancestral way, about human laziness. If a person seems incapacitated by depression, Twerski must investigate the possibility of a biochemical problem before resorting to the conventional prescription of mussar---the performance of mitzvot.

And further:

"In my earlier days of doing psychotherapy, treating persons with a negative self-image was most distressing," [Twerski] recalled, "I would become angry because it seemed to me that the patient preferred to wallow in the mire of his fantasied worthlessness." "The trick in therapy," he concluded, using the English equivalent of the word mussar employed (tachbulah) to describe both the evil urge and methods to defeat it, "is to remove the distortion" of view that hindered psychological and moral growth. Starting out with an old-fashioned moralism that emphasized the stubborn will as chief stumbling block to self-improvement, Twerski ended up with the premise that psychological blocks were essentially involuntary and therefore tantamount to physical disabilities, albeit ones subject to remedy.

== Personal life ==
Rabbi Twerski retired from full-time work in 1995, and moved to Monsey, New York, the hometown of his second wife, Gail. After ten years in Monsey, they moved to Teaneck, New Jersey. Rabbi Twerski finally moved to Israel with his wife, and called for his fellow Jews to do the same.

His brothers are Aaron Twerski, the Irwin and Jill Cohen Professor of Law at Brooklyn Law School, as well as a former Dean and Professor of tort Law at Hofstra University Law School; Rabbi Michel Twerski, the Hornosteipler Rebbe of Milwaukee; the late Shloime Twerski, the previous Hornosteipler Rebbe of Denver; and the late Mordechai Dov Ber Twerski of New York. Rabbi Abraham Joshua Twerski died in Jerusalem on January 31, 2021, of COVID-19 during the COVID-19 pandemic in Israel. He was survived by his wife Dr. Gail Twerski, three sons and one daughter, and grandchildren, great-grandchildren, and great-great-grandchildren.

In his will he specified that he did not want eulogies at his funeral, but rather for his children to sing the song he composed, "Hoshia es Amecha", as they led his body to his grave.

== Works ==
He wrote over 90 books on Judaism and self-help topics, including several books with Charles M. Schulz's Peanuts comic strips used to illustrate human interaction and behavior.

- Addictive Thinking and the Addictive Personality: two books in one, with Craig Nakken (M.J.F., 1999)
- Addictive Thinking: Why Do We Lie to Ourselves?: Why Do Others Believe Us? (Hazelden Foundation, 1990)
- Addictive Thinking: Understanding Self-deception, with foreword by John Wallace (Harper & Row, 1990; 2nd Ed. Hazelden Foundation, 1997)
- Alive!: A 10-step Guide to a Vibrant life, with Mordechai Weinberger (Shaar Press, 2015)
- Angels Don't Leave Footprints: Discovering What's Right With Yourself (Artscroll Mesorah Publications, 2001)
- Caution: "Kindness" Can Be Dangerous to the Alcoholic (Prentice-Hall, 1981, 1987)
- The Clergy and Chemical Dependency (Edgehill, 1990)
- Compulsive Gambling: More Than Dreidel (Mirkov Publications, 2006)
- Coping With Stress: The 9/11 Generation (Gateway Rehabilitation Center, 2002, 35 pp.)
- Dear Rabbi, Dear Doctor: The Renowned Rabbi-Psychiatrist Gives Straight Answers to Tough Questions (Shaar Press / Artscroll Mesorah Publications, 2005)
- Dear Rabbi, Dear Doctor Volume 2: The Renowned Rabbi-Psychiatrist Gives Straight Answers to Tough Questions (Shaar Press / Artscroll Mesorah Publications, 2007)
- Dearer Than Life: Making Your Life More Meaningful (Artscroll Mesorah Publications, 1997)
- Do Unto Others: How Good Deeds Can Change Your Life (Andrews McMeel, 1997)
- Effective Living: An Upbeat and Uplifting Life Can be Yours (Shaar Press / Mesorah Publications, 2014)
- The Enemy Within: Confronting your Challenges in the 21st Century (Shaar Press / Artscroll Mesorah Publications, 2001)
- The First Year of Marriage: Enhancing the Success of Your Marriage Right from the Start—and Even Before it Begins (Artscroll Mesorah Publications, 2004)
- Forgiveness: Don't Let Resentment Keep You Captive (Shaar Press / Artscroll Mesorah Publications, 2012)
- A Formula for Proper Living: Practical Lessons from Life and Torah (Jewish Lights Publishing, 2009)
- Four Chassidic Masters: the Heart, the Mind, the Eye, and the Tongue—History, Stories, Teachings (Shaar Press / Artscroll Mesorah Publications, 2008)
- From Bondage to Freedom: the Passover Haggadah with a Commentary Illuminating the Liberation of the Spirit, with Hirsh Michel Chinn and Benzion Twerski (Shaar Press / Artscroll Mesorah Publications, 1995, 2001)
- From Pulpit to Couch (Mirkov publications, 2005)
- Generation to Generation: Personal Recollections of a Chassidic Legacy (Traditional Press, 1986. Excerpted edition pub. by C.I.S., 2003)
- Getting Up When You're Down: A Mature Discussion of an Adult Malady - Depression and Related Conditions (Shaar Press / Artscroll Mesorah Publications, 1997)
- Gevurah: My Life, Our World, and the Adventure of Reaching 80, (Shaar Press / Artscroll Mesorah Publications, 2010)
- Growing Each Day (Artscroll Mesorah Publications, 2004)
- Happiness and the Human Spirit: The Spirituality of Becoming the Best You Can Be (Jewish Lights Publishing, 2007)
- Healing from Despair: Choosing Wholeness in a Broken World, with Elie Kaplan Spitz and Erica Shapiro Taylor (Jewish Lights Publishing, 2010)
- I Am I: a Jewish Perspective From the Case Files of an Eminent Psychiatrist (Shaar Press / Artscroll Mesorah Publications, 1993)
- I'd Like to Call for Help, but I Don't Know the Number: The Search for Spirituality in Everyday Life (Pharos Books, 1991; Henry Holt, 1996)
- I Didn't Ask to Be in This Family: Sibling Relationships and How They Shape Adult Behavior and Relationships, with Charles M. Schulz (Henry Holt, 1996)
- I Didn't Ask to Be in This Family: Sibling Relationships and How They Shape Adult Relationships (Topper Books, 1992)
- In-Laws: It's All Relative, with Leah Shifrin Averick (The Shaar Press / Artscroll Mesorah Publications, 2009)
- I've Gotta Get Out of My Way!: Eliminating the Obstacles to Success (Mekor Press / Menucha Publishers, 2017)
- It Happens to Doctors, Too (Hazelden Foundation, 1982)
- It's Not As Tough As You Think: How to Smooth Out Life's Bumps (The Shaar Press / Artscroll Mesorah Publications, 1999)
- It's Not As Tough At Home As You Think: Making Family Life at Home Smoother and Better (The Shaar Press / Artscroll Mesorah Publications, 1999)
- Let Us Make Man: Self-esteem Through Jewishness (C.I.S, 1991)
- Letters to my Children (Shaar Press / Mesorah Publications, 2015)
- Life's Blessings: The Meaning and Significance of our Berachos (The Shaar Press, 2015)
- Life's Too Short: Pull the Plug on Self-defeating Behavior and Turn On the Power of Self-esteem (St. Martin's Press, 1995)
- Light At the End of the Tunnel: An Inspirational Story Fiction. (Artscroll Mesorah Publications, 2003)
- Lights Along the Way: Timeless Lessons for Today from Rabbi Moshe Chaim Luzzatto's Mesillas Yesharim (Artscroll Mesorah Publications, 1995)
- Like Yourself: And Others Will, Too (Prentice-Hall, 1978, 1986)
- Living Each Day (Artscroll Mesorah Publications, 1988, 5th ed. 2003)
- Living Each Week (Artscroll Mesorah Publications, 1992)
- Messages From The Mishnah (Shaar Press / Artscroll Mesorah Publications, 2013)
- Not Just Stories: The Chassidic Spirit Through Its Classic Stories (Shaar Press / Artscroll Mesorah Publications, 1997)
- Overcoming Burnout: Recognizing, Addressing and Preventing Burnout - in Yeshivah, the Workplace, and Beyond, with Alon Gul (Lakewood NJ: Israel Bookshop Publications, 2013)
- Positive Parenting: Developing Your Child's Potential, with Ursula Verena Schwartz (Artscroll Mesorah Publications, 1996)
- A Practical Guide to Rabbinic Counseling, with Yisrael N Levitz (Feldheim, 2005; Jewish Lights Publishing, 2012)
- Prayerfully Yours: Creating the Bond Between Man and His Maker (Shaar Press / Artscroll Mesorah Publications, 2001)
- The Problem Was Me: How to End Negative Self-talk and Take Your Life to a New Level, with Thomas Gagliano (Gentle Path Press, 2011)
- The Rabbi & the Nuns: The Inside Story of a Rabbi's Therapeutic Work With the Sisters of St. Francis, (Mekor Press / Menucha Publishers, 2013)
- Rebbes and Chassidim: What They Said - What They Meant (Shaar Press / Artscroll Mesorah Publications, 2000)
- Recognizing a Loved One's Addiction, and Providing Help (Jewish Lights Publishing, 2004)
- Seek Sobriety, Find Serenity: Thoughts for Every Day (Pharos Books, 1993; Feldheim Publishers 2014)
- Seize the Moments: Captivating Nuggets of Torah Wisdom (Shaar Press / Artscroll Mesorah Publications, 2011)
- Self-Discovery in Recovery (Hazelden Foundation, 1984; Harper & Row, 1989)
- Self-improvement? I'm Jewish!: Overcoming Self-defeating Behavior (Shaar Press / Artscroll Mesorah Publications, 1995)
- The Shabbos Companion: Customs, Prayers, Stories, Zemiros: Shabbos Day (The Shaar Press / Artscroll Mesorah Publications, 2008)
- The Shabbos Companion: Customs, Prayers, Stories, Zemiros: Shabbos Eve (The Shaar Press / Artscroll Mesorah Publications, 2007)
- The Shame Borne in Silence: Spouse Abuse in the Jewish Community (Mirkov Publications, 1996; 2nd ed. Urim Publications, 2014)
- Simchah: It's Not Just Happiness (Artscroll Mesorah Publications, 2006)
- Smiling Each Day (Artscroll Mesorah Publications, 1993, 4th ed. 2003)
- The Spiritual Self: Reflections on Recovery and God (Hazelden Foundation, 2000)
- Stepping Out of the Abyss: a Jewish Guide to the 12 Steps, Menachem Poznanski, Aryeh Buchsbayew, and Abraham J Twerski (Mosaica Press, 2017)
- Substance-Abusing High Achievers: Addiction as an Equal Opportunity Destroyer (J. Aronson, 1998)
- Successful Relationships at Home, at Work and with Friends: Bringing Control Issues under Control (Shaar Press / Artscroll Mesorah Publications, 2003)
- The Sun will Shine Again: Coping, Persevering, and Winning in Troubled Economic Times (The Shaar Press / Artscroll Mesorah Publications, 2009)
- A Taste of Nostalgia: Tales and Recipes to Nourish Body and Soul, with Judi Dick (Shaar Press / Artscroll Mesorah Publications, 2006)
- Ten Steps To Being Your Best: a Practical Handbook to Enhance Your Life in Every Way (The Shaar Press / Artscroll Mesorah Publications, 2004)
- Teshuvah Through Recovery: Experience the Transformative Power of the Twelve Steps (Mekor Press, 2016)
- That's Not a Fault...It's a Character Trait (St. Martin's Press, 1999)
- The Thin You Within You: Winning the Weight Game with Self-Esteem (St. Martin's Press, 1997)
- Twerski on Chumash (Shaar Press / Artscroll Mesorah Publications, 2003)
- Twerski on Machzor: Rosh Hashanah (Shaar Press / Artscroll Mesorah Publications, 2011)
- Twerski on Machzor: Yom Kippur (Shaar Press / Artscroll Mesorah Publications, 2012)
- Twerski on Prayer: Creating the Bond Between Man and His Maker, a re-issue of Prayerfully Yours (Shaar Press / Artscroll Mesorah Publications, 2004)
- Twerski On Spirituality (Shaar Press / Artscroll Mesorah Publications, 1998)
- Visions of the Fathers Pirkei Avos (Artscroll Mesorah Publications, 1999, 2005)
- Waking Up Just In Time: A Therapist Shows How to Use The Twelve-Steps Approach to Life's Ups And Downs, with Charles M. Schulz (Topper Books, 1990; St. Martin's Press, 1995)
- When Do the Good Things Start?, with Charles M. Schulz (Topper Books, 1988; St. Martin's Press, 1995)
- Who Says You're Neurotic: How to Avoid Mistaken Psychiatric Diagnoses When the Problem May Be a Physical Condition (Prentice-Hall, 1984)
- Wisdom Each Day (Artscroll Mesorah Publications, 2000)
- Without a Job, Who Am I?: Rebuilding Your Self When You've Lost Your Job, Home, or Life Savings (Hazelden Foundation, 2009)
- The Zeide Reb Motele: The Life of the Tzaddik R'Mordechai Dov of Hornosteipel (Artscroll Mesorah Publications, 2002)

== See also ==
- Twerski
