= Shpikov (Hasidic dynasty) =

Ukrainian Hasidic dynasty

Shpikov is a Hasidic dynasty originating in Shpykiv. The dynasty is derived from the Skver dynasty, which in turn is derived from the Chernobyl dynasty.

The first rebbe of Shpikov was Rabbi Menachem Nochum Twersky of Shpykiv.

== Lineage ==
- Rabbi Yitzchak Twersky of Skver
  - Rabbi Menachem Nochum Twersky of Shpikov (died March 26, 1887, at Shpikov), second son of Rabbi Yitzchak
    - Rabbi Mordechai Twersky of Shpikov (born 1862, died April 14, 1914, at Shpikov), son of Rabbi Menachem Nochum
      - Rabbi Yitschok Nochum Twersky of Shpikov (born 1888 at Shpikov, perished 1942 at Belzec extermination camp) son of Rabbi Mordechai
      - Rabbi Sholom Yosef Friedman of Shpikov (died March 1920 of typhus), son of Rabbi Dovid Friedman of Bohush and son-in-law of Rabbi Mordechai
        - Rabbi Dovid Friedman of Shpikov-Ploiești, son of Rabbi Sholom Yosef
        - Rabbi Yitzchok Friedman of Bohush-Shpikov (born May 1903 at Shpikov, died Wednesday, August 12, 1992, at Arosa), son of Rabbi Sholom Yosef and husband of his cousin, Yocheved Feige, daughter of Rabbi Menachem Mendel of Bohush

== See also ==
- Hasidic Judaism
- Hasidic rebbes
- Skver (Hasidic dynasty)
- Bohush (Hasidic dynasty)
