= Turiisk Raion =

Former subdivision of Volyn Oblast, Ukraine

Turiisk Raion Турійський район
- Raion
- Flag Coat of arms

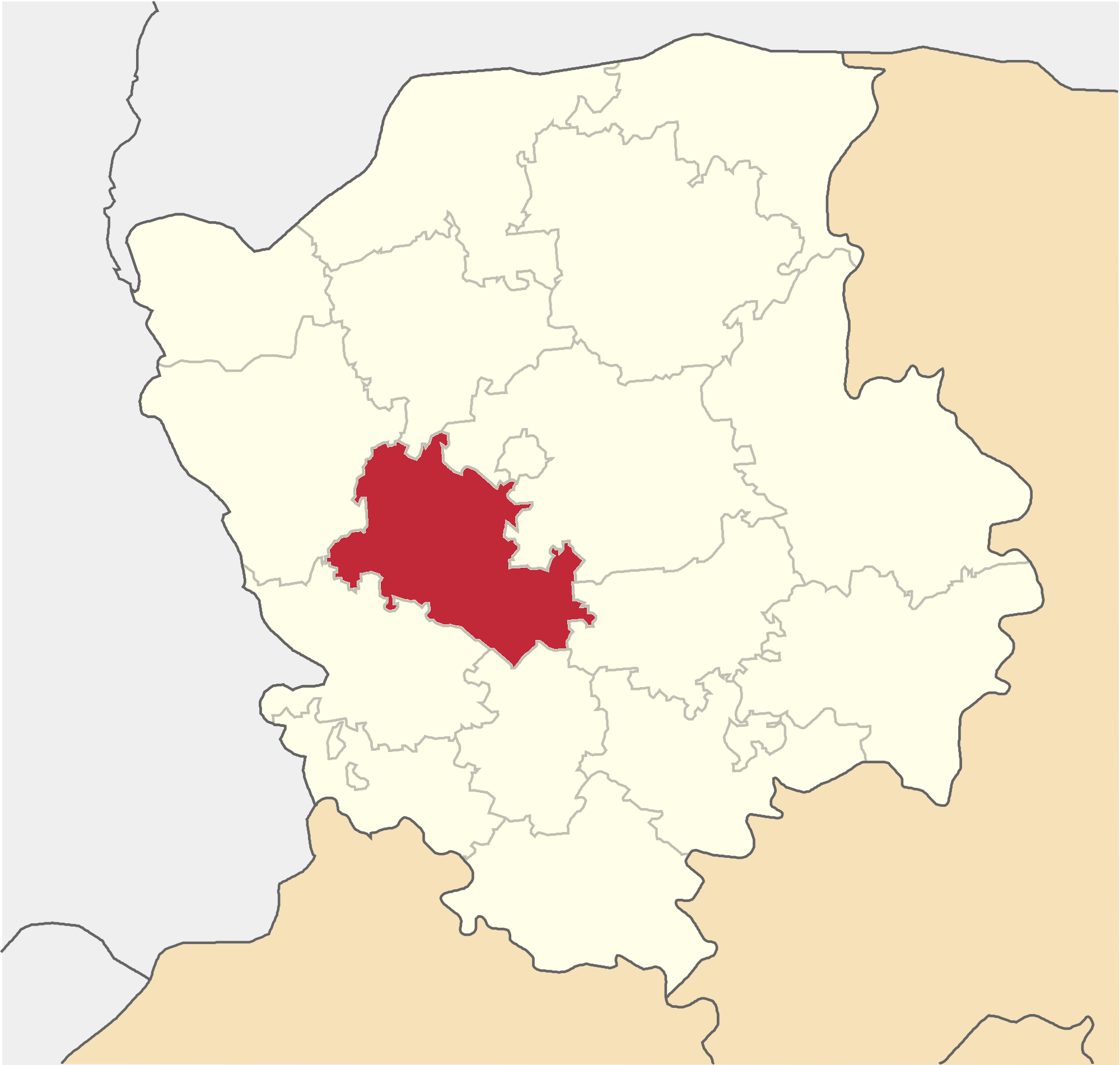
- Coordinates: 51°06′00″N 24°30′00″E
- Country: Ukraine
- Oblast: Volyn Oblast
- Established: 1965
- Disestablished: 18 July 2020
- Admin. center: Turiisk
- Subdivisions: List: — city councils; — settlement councils; — rural councils; Number of localities: — cities; — urban-type settlements; 74 — villages; — rural settlements

Area
  - Total: 1,205 km^{2} (465 sq mi)

Population (2020)
  - Total: 25,889
  - Density: 21.48/km^{2} (55.64/sq mi)
- Time zone: UTC+02:00 (EET)
  - Summer (DST): UTC+03:00 (EEST)
- Area code: 380-3363
- Website: www.turadm.gov.ua

Turiisk Raion (Ukrainian: Турійський район) was a raion in Volyn Oblast in western Ukraine. Its administrative center was the urban-type settlement of Turiisk. The raion was abolished and its territory was merged into Kovel Raion on 18 July 2020 as part of the administrative reform of Ukraine, which reduced the number of raions of Volyn Oblast to four. The last estimate of the raion population was 25,889 (2020 est.) According to the 2001 Census, the population was 29,043.

== See also ==
- Administrative divisions of Volyn Oblast
- Trisk (Hasidic dynasty)
