= Lineage and scions of the Chernobyl dynasty =

Ashkenazi Jewish dynasty founded in the 18th century

Chernobyl (Hasidic dynasty)
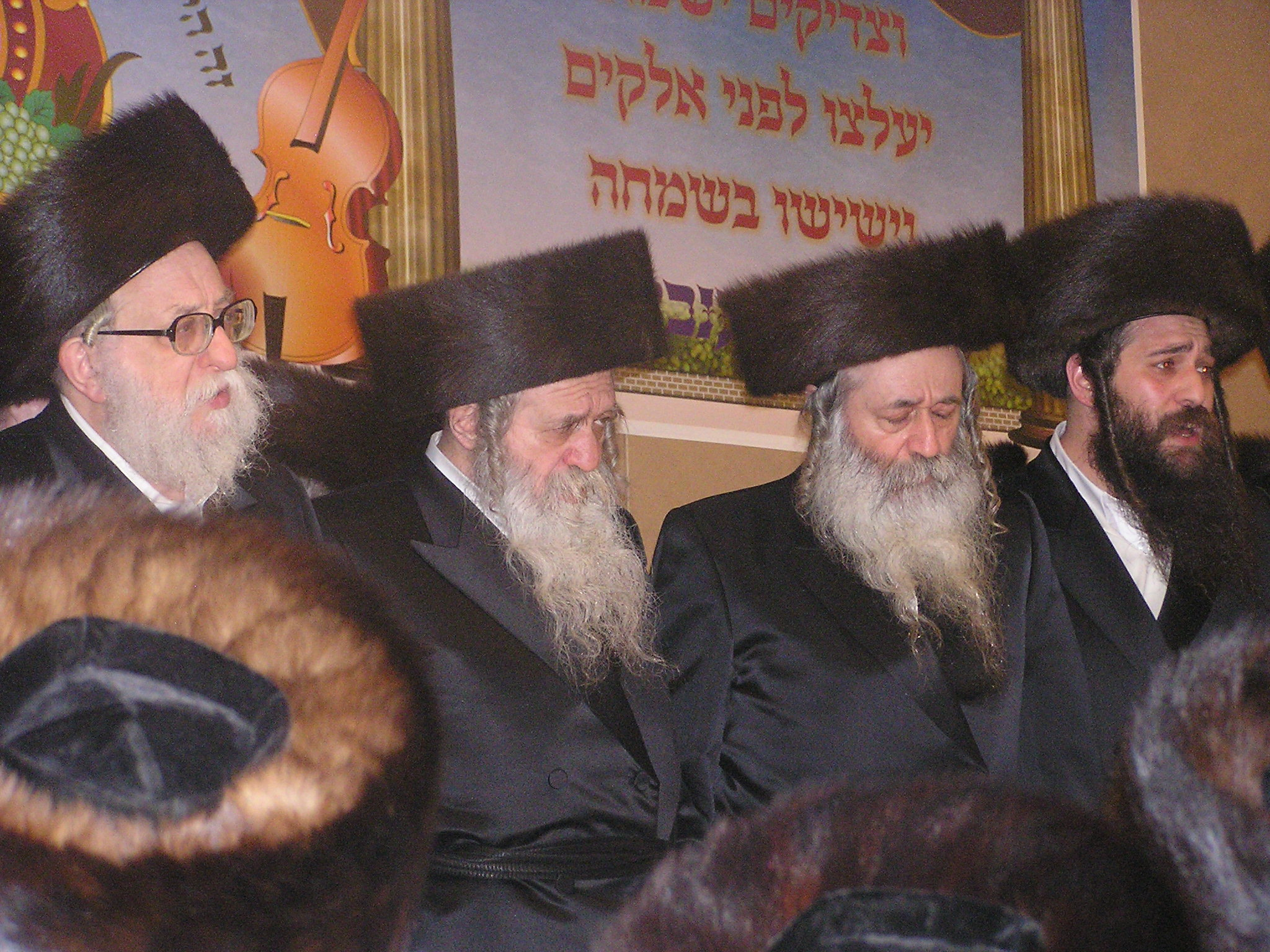
- (l-r) Rachmastrifker Rebbe of New York; Chernobyler Bnei Brak; Chernobyler of New York; Moredechai Twersky, son of Chernobyler of New York

Founder
- Rabbi Menachem Nachum Twersky

Regions with significant populations
- Israel, United States

Religions
- Hasidic Judaism

Chernobyl (Yiddish: טשערנאָביל) is a Hasidic dynasty which was founded by Grand Rabbi Menachem Nachum Twersky, known by his work as the Meor Einayim. The dynasty is named after the northern Ukrainian city of Chernobyl, where Rabbi Nachum was the maggid (lit. '[communal] preacher'). Several rebbes are named Chernobyl. The central court is in Bnei Brak, headed by Rabbi Menachem Nachum Twersky.

The term Chernobyl dynasty is used generally for the sects of the descendants of Rabbi Mordechai of Chernobyl; the dynasties of Chernobyl, Skver, Trisk, Rachmastrivka, Hornosteipel, and the past dynasty of Machnovka. It is similar to the Belz, Makarov and Shpikov dynasties and their offshoots.

== Founders ==
- Rabbi Menachem Nachum of Chernobyl, founder of the dynasty, was a disciple of the Baal Shem Tov (founder of the Hasidic movement) and the Maggid of Mezritch and author of the books Me'or Einayim and Yesamach Lev. His father was Rabbi Zvi Hirsch, son of Rabbi Nachum Gaon of Narinsk. He was a maggid meisharim in the communities of Narynsk, Pogrebishti and Chernobyl, and was poor most of his life. He died on 11 Cheshvan in 1798.
- Rabbi Mordechai Twersky of Chernobyl, known as the Maggid of Chernobyl, was the son of Rabbi Menachem Nachum and Sarah. He was married to the daughter of Rabbi Aharon the Great of Karlin and then to Feiga, the daughter of Rabbi Dovid Leikas. Unlike his father, he was rich and traveled in a horse-drawn carriage. His teachings were collected in the book, Likutei Torah. He died on 24 May 1837 and was buried in Ignatowka, near Kyiv, survived by eight sons and three daughters.
- Rabbi Aaron Twersky of Chernobyl was the son of Rabbi Mordechai and Chaya Sara. Born in 1784, he was named after his grandfather, Rabbi Aharon the Great of Karlin. In his youth his father forced him to serve as rebbe, and he traveled extensively through the surrounding cities. At his father's death, he assumed the leadership of his community and the surrounding area. Active in strengthening settlement of the land of Israel, he died on 21 November 1871 and was survived by six children with his second wife.

== Lineage ==
- Grand Rabbi Menachem Nochum Twersky of Chernobyl (1730–1797) – author of Meor Einayim, disciple of the Baal Shem Tov
  - Grand Rabbi Mordechai Twersky (1770–1837) – the Chernobyler Maggid, son of the Meor Einayim. His eight sons became rebbes and founded their own dynasties.
    - Grand Rabbi Aaron Twersky of Chernobyl (1784–1871), eldest son of Rebbe Mordechai
      - Grand Rabbi Yeshaya Meshulom Zishe Twersky of Chernobyl (1814–1881), son of Rebbe Aaron
        - Grand Rabbi Shlomo BenZion Twersky of Chernobyl (1870–1939), son of Rebbe Yeshayo Meshulom Zishe
      - Grand Rabbi Boruch Osher Twersky of Chernobyl (d. 1905), son of Rebbe Aaron
        - Grand Rabbi Shlomo Shmuel Twersky of Chernobyl-Brooklyn (d.1936), son of Rebbe Boruch Osher and son-in-law of Rebbe Yeshaya Meshulom Zishe
          - Grand Rabbi Yaakov Yisroel Twersky, Chernobyler Rebbe of Boro Park (1902–1983), son of Rebbe Shlomo Shmuel – the last Chernobyler Rebbe who was born in Chernobyl
            - Rabbi Shlomo Twersky (d. 2017), son of Grand Rabbi Yaakov Yisroel Twersky, Rabbi of Kehal Chasidy Chernobel in Lawrence, New York
              - Grand Rabbi Zvi Twersky – Rosh Yeshiva of Yeshivas Toras Chaim in Romema, Jerusalem, son of Rabbi Shlomo Twersky of Lawrence, New York
      - Grand Rabbi Menachem Nochum Twerski of Loiev, son of Rebbe Aaron
        - Grand Rabbi Mordechai Twerski of Loiev (1840–1905), son of Rebbe Menachem Nochum
          - Grand Rabbi Avrohom Yehoshua Heshl Twerski of Loiev-Tshudnov (1860–1914), son of Rebbe Mordechai of Loiev
            - Grand Rabbi Chaim Yitzchak Twerski of Loiev-Kiev (1886–1943), son of Rebbe Avrohom Yehoshua Heshl of Loiev-Tshudnov
              - Grand Rabbi Meshulam Zusha Twerski (1917–1987), Chernobyl-Loiev Rebbe of Bnei Brak, son of Rebbe Chaim Yitzchak of Loiev-Kiev
                - Grand Rabbi Menachem Nachum Twerski (b. 1942), Chernobyl-Loiev Rebbe of Bnei Brak, son of Rebbe Meshulam Zusha of Chernobyl-Loiev
                - Grand Rabbi Yeshaya Twerski (b. 1944), Chernobyl-Loiev Rebbe of Boro Park, son of Rebbe Meshulam Zusha of Chernobyl-Loiev
          - Grand Rabbi Boruch Bentsion Twerski of Loiev-Uman (1875–1945), son of Rebbe Mordechai of Loiev
            - Rabbi Chaim Mordechai Twersky (1921-2013), Chernobyler Rav of Boro Park and Rabbi of Maimonides Hospital in Brooklyn, New York, grandson of Rabbi Boruch Bentsion of Loiev-Uman
              - Rabbi Baruch Benzion Twersky, Chernobyler Rav of Monsey, son of Rabbi Chaim Mordechai of Boro Park
    - Grand Rabbi Yaakov Yisroel Twersky of Cherkas, (1794–1876) – son of the Maggid of Chernobyl
      - Rebbe Mordechai Dov Twerski of Hornosteipel (1839–1903), author of "Emek Sheilah" and four other seforim – grandson of the Rebbe Yaakov Yisroel Twerski and great-great-grandson of Rebbe Zishe of Anipoli
        - Rebbe Chaim Moshe Tzvi Twerski of Hornosteipel-Rachmastrivka (1866–1933) – son of the Rebbe Mordechai Dov. Son-in-law of Rebbe Nuchum of Rachmastrivka of the Chernobal dynasty
        - Rebbe Ben Tzion Yehuda Leib Twerski of Hornosteipel-USA (1867–1951) – son of Rebbe Mordechai Dov
          - Rabbi Chaim Aharon Twerski – son of Rebbe Ben Tzion Yehuda Leib – son-in-law of Rebbe Yaakov Yisroel Dovid Hager of Strozhnits
          - Rabbi Menachem Nuchim Twerski son of Rebbe Ben Tzion Yehuda Leib – son of Rebbe Ben Tzion Yehuda Leib – son-in-law of Rebbe Yosef Zvi Kalish of Skernovitz-Bnei Braq (Vorka Hasidic dynasty)
          - Rebbe Yaakov Yisroel Twerski of Hornosteipel-Milwaukee (1900–1973) – son and successor of Rebbe Ben Tzion Yehuda Leib, son-in-law of Rebbe Benzion Halberstam of Bobov
            - Rebbe Ben Tzion Chaim Shloime Meshulam Zusia Twerski of Hornosteipel-Denver (1923–1981) – son of Rebbe Yaakov Yisroel of Milwaukee
              - Rebbe Mordechai Dov Ber Twerski of Hornosteipel-Denver (b. 1949), in Flatbush, Brooklyn – only son of Rebbe Shloime of Denver
              - Rebbe Shalom Shachna Friedman of Hornosteipel-Beitar Illit – son-in-law of Rebbe Shloime of Denver
            - Rebbe Mordechai Dov Ber Twerski (1924–1998), son of Rebbe Yaakov Yisroel of Milwaukee
              - Rebbe Shmuel Dovid Beck of Apsha (b' 1950) Rav Beis Medrash Ahavas Dovid in Flatbush – son-in-law of Rebbe Mordechai Dov Ber Twerski
              - Rebbe Shulem Noach Landau Rosh Yeshivas Veretsky in Flatbush – son-in-law of Rebbe Mordechai Dov Ber Twerski
            - Rabbi Dr. Abraham J. Twerski, M.D., son of Rebbe Yaakov Yisroel of Milwaukee
            - Rebbe Yechiel Michel Twerski of Hornosteipel-Milwaukee (b. 1939) – son of Rebbe Yaakov Yisroel of Milwaukee
              - The Milwaukee Rebbe has sons who lead their own communities in Chicago, Monsey, Lakewood, London, Milwaukee
            - Rabbi Aaron Twerski, son of Rebbe Yaakov Yisroel of Milwaukee
    - Grand Rabbi Yitzhak Twersky of Skver, (1812–1885) son of Rebbe Mordechai; son-in-law of Rabbi Tzvi Hirsh of Skver, a patrilineal descendant of the Baal Shem Tov
      - Grand Rabbi David (Duvidl) Twersky of Skver (1848–1919) – son of Rebbe Itzikl
        - Grand Rabbi Mordechai Twersky of Skver (1868–1919) – son of Rebbe Duvidl
          - Grand Rabbi Yitzchak Twersky of Skver (1888–1941) – arrived in America in 1923, son of Rabbi Mordechai
            - Grand Rabbi David Twersky of Skver-Boro Park (1922–2001) – son of Rabbi Yitzchak
              - Grand Rabbi Yechiel Michl Twersky – present Skverer Rebbe of Boro Park, son of Rabbi David
        - Grand Rabbi Shlomo Twersky of Skver (1870–1921) – son of Rebbe Duvidl
          - Grand Rabbi Eluzar Twersky of Faltishan-Skver (1893–1976) – Rebbe of Faltishan (Fălticeni, Romania); son of Rabbi Shlomo; arrived in America in 1947.
            - Grand Rabbi Yisrael Avraham Stein of Faltishan (1915–1989) – Rabbi of Faltishan, and Faltishaner Rebbe in Brooklyn; son-in-law of Rabbi Elazar; arrived in America in 1946.
              - Grand Rabbi Mordechai Stein of Faltishan – present Faltishaner Rabbe; son of Rabbi Yisrael Avraham.
            - Rabbi Avrom Twersky of Faltishan (ca. 1920–1985) – Rebbe of Faltishan Borough Park; son of Rabbi Eluzer
              - Grand Rabbi Shulem Meir Twersky – Current Faltishan Borough Park Rebbe; son of Rabbi Avrom
        - Grand Rabbi Yakov Yosef Twersky of Skver (1899–1968) – Rebbe of New Square; son of Rabbi Duvid'l
          - Grand Rabbi David Twersky of Skver – current Rebbe of New Square and Grand Rabbi of the Skverer Hasidim worldwide; son of Rebbe Yaakov Yosef
    - Grand Rabbi Avrohom Twersky of Trisk, son of Rebbe Mordechai, author of Mogen Avrohom (d. 1889)
    - Grand Rabbi David Twersky of Tolna, son of Rebbe Mordechai
      - Rabbi Motel Twersky
        - Rabbi Menachem Nochum Twersky
          - Rabbi Meshulem Zusia Twersky
            - Rabbi Isadore Twersky
    - Grand Rabbi Yochanan Twersky of Rachmastrivka, son of Rebbe Mordechai

== Scions of the dynasty ==
- Grand Rabbi Menachem Nochum Twerski, Chernobyler Rebbe of Bnei Brak;
- Grand Rabbi Yeshaya Twersky, Chernobyler Rebbe of Borough Park, Brooklyn;
- The Chernobyler Rebbe of Ashdod;
- Grand Rabbi David Twersky, of New Square, New York, leader of the Skver dynasty;
- Grand Rabbi Michel Twersky, Skverer Rebbe of Boro Park;
- Grand Rabbi Michel Twerski, Hornosteipler Rebbe of Milwaukee;
- Grand Rabbi Mordechai Dov Ber Twerski, Hornosteipel-Denver Rebbe of Flatbush, Brooklyn;
- Grand Rabbi Shalom Shachna Friedman, Hornosteipler Rebbe of Jerusalem;
- Rabbi Abraham J. Twerski, author and psychiatrist;
- Rabbi Aaron Twerski, retired dean of Hofstra Law School;
- Rabbi Dovid Twersky, Rachmastrivka Rebbe of Jerusalem;
- Rabbi Chai Yitzchok Twersky, Rachmastrivka Rebbe of Borough Park;
- Grand Rabbi Menachem Mendel Matisyohu Twersky, Trisker Rebbe of London;
  - Grand Rabbi Yitzchok Duvid Twersky of Trisk-Tolna, son of Rabbi Menachem Mendel Matisyohu
- Rabbi Moshe Mordechai Eichenstein, Trisker Rebbe of Jerusalem;
- Rabbi Yitzchak Menachem Weinberg, Tolner Rebbe of Jerusalem;
- Rabbi Amitai Twersky, Tolner Rebbe of Ashdod;
- Rabbi Chaim Eliezer Twerski, son of Reb Mottel Twerski of Flatbush, Rosh Yeshiva Hebrew Theological College and Rav of Bais Chaim Dovid, Lincolnwood, Illinois;
- Rabbi Yitzhak Twersky, Tolner Rebbe of Boston and professor and head of the Center for Jewish Studies at Harvard University;
  - Rabbi Mayer Twersky, son of Rabbi Yitzhak Twersky of Boston, Rosh Yeshiva of Rabbi Isaac Elchanon Theological Seminary of Yeshiva University;
  - Rabbi Mosheh Twersky, son of Rabbi Yitzhak Twersky of Boston, Rosh Mesivta of Yeshiva Toras Moshe in Jerusalem;
- Grand Rabbi Yitzhak Aharon Korff, grandson of Rebbe Yaakov Yisroel Korff, Zvhil–Mezbuz Rebbe of Boston.
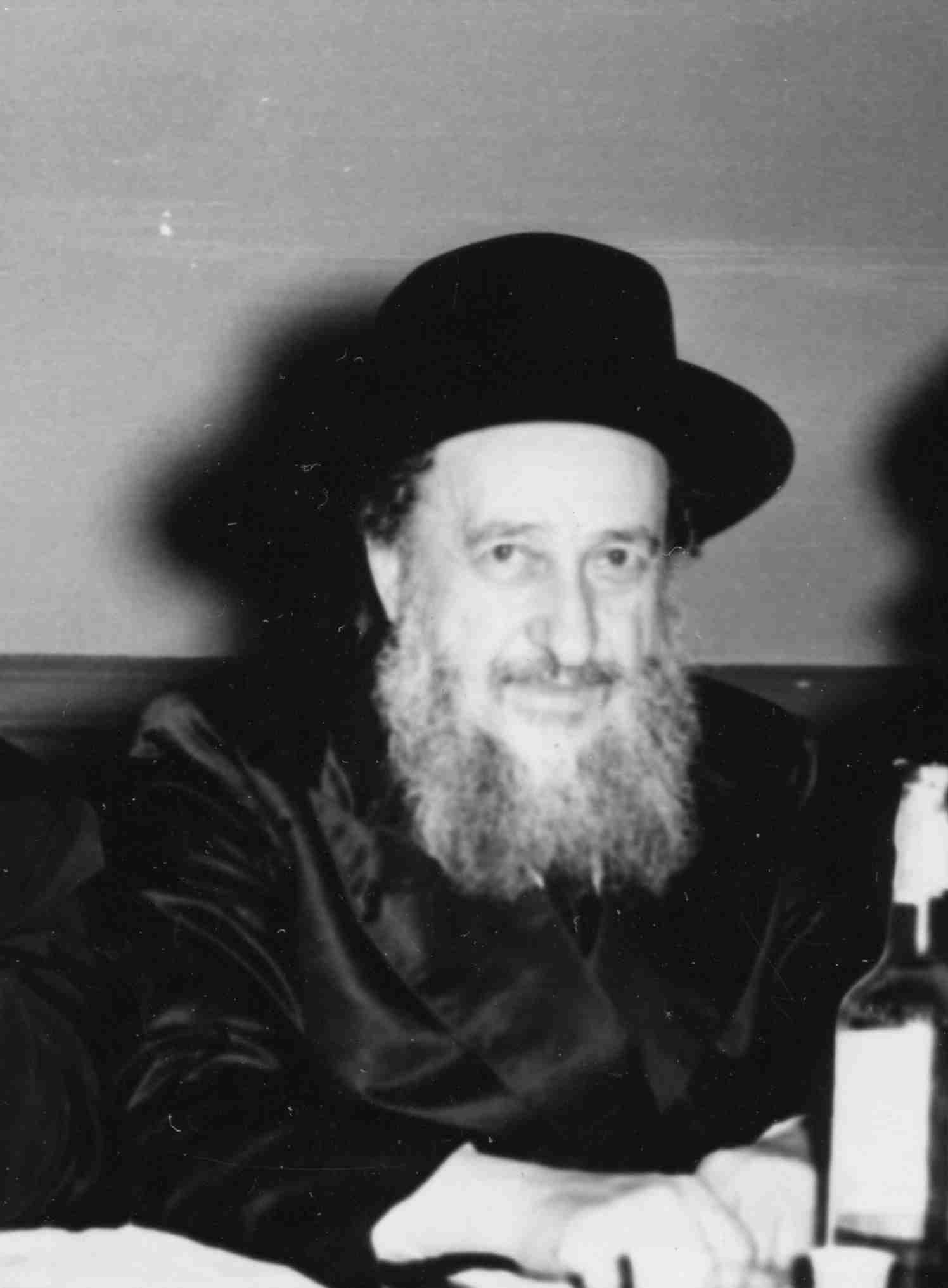
Grand Rabbi Yaakov Yisrael Twersky, Chernobyler Rebbe of Boro Park, the last Chernobyler Rebbe to serve in Chernobyl

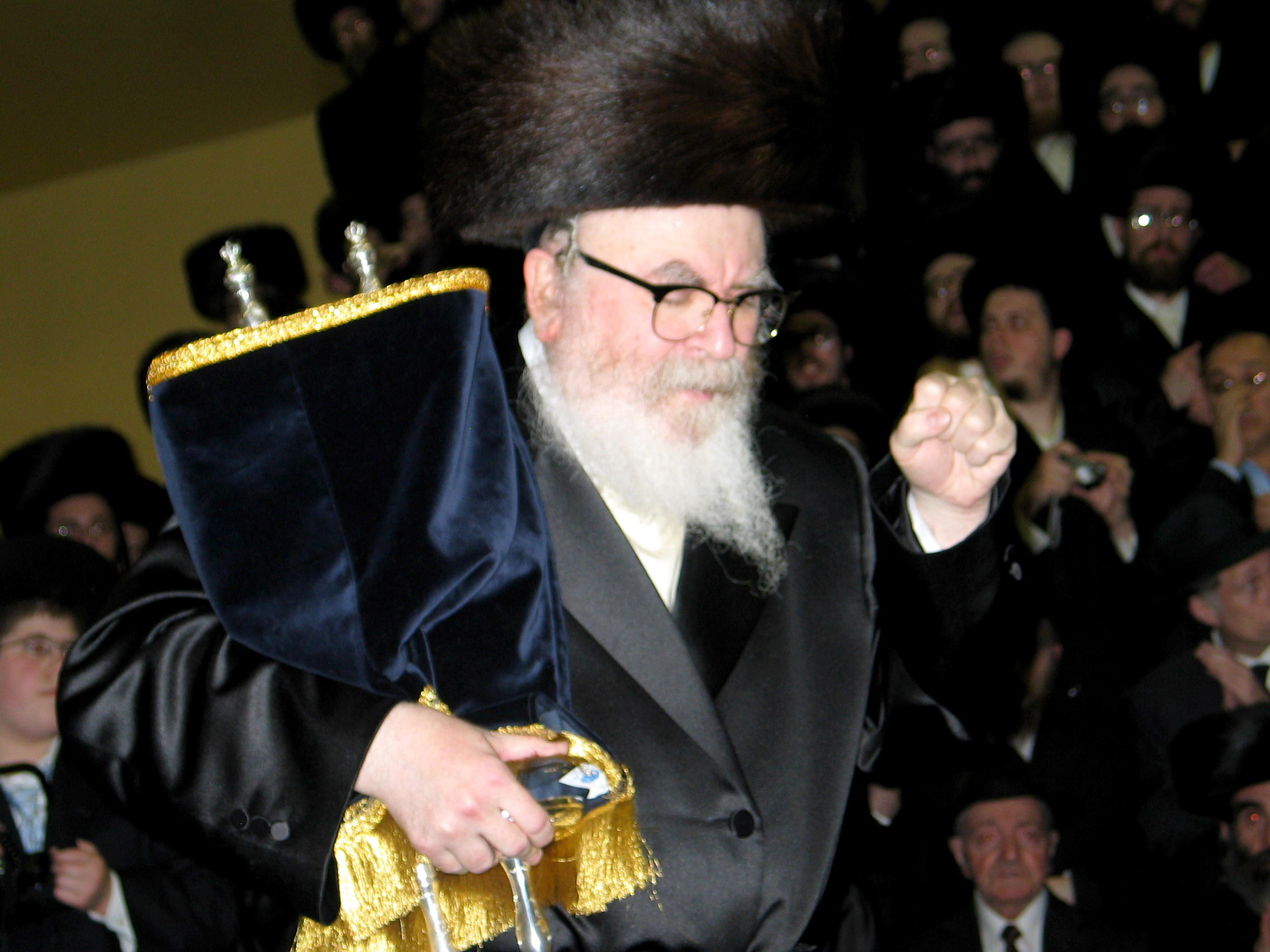
Grand Rabbi David Twersky, Skverer Rebbe and scion of the Chernobyl dynasty

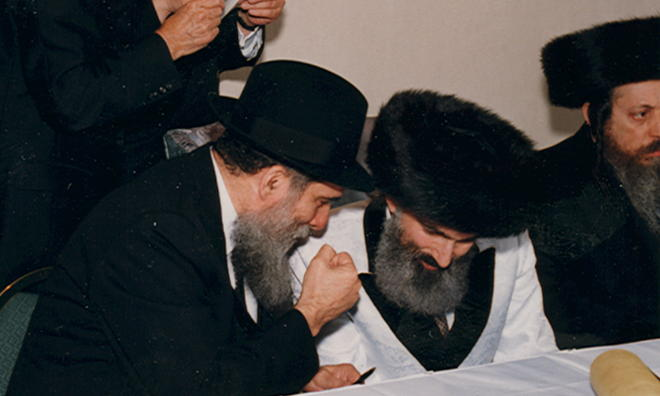
Zvhil-Mezbuz Rebbe of Boston, Grand Rabbi Y. A. Korff (center), and Rabbi Yitzhak (Isadore) Twersky, Tolna Rebbe of Boston (left). Courtesy of the Office of The Zvhil-Mezbuz Rebbe, Boston.
