= Trisk (Hasidic dynasty) =

Ukrainian Hasidic dynasty

The Trisk dynasty is a Volyn (then in the Russian Empire, today Ukraine) Hasidic dynasty, a branch of the Chernobyl dynasty, originating in Turiisk, Ukraine. The rebbes of the court also served in Poland, before the Second World War it was a large court of some 20,000 Hasidim (followers).

Today there are several descendants of the lineage, but they have no real court.

== First generation ==
The first rebbe of Trisk was Grand Rabbi Avraham Twersky (born 1806, died July 1, 1889, in Turisk), son of Grand Rabbi Mordechai Twersky of Chernobyl.

== Post Holocaust ==
Grand Rabbi Menachem Mendel Matisyohu Twersky is known as the Trisker Rebbe of London.

== Lineage ==
- Grand Rabbi Menachem Nuchem Twersky (born June 23, 1829, died 1887 at Brisk), eldest son of Grand Rabbi Avraham.
  - Grand Rabbi Mordechai Zishe Twersky of Trisk-Iasi (died March 18, 1932, in Romania), eldest son of Rabbi Menachem Nuchem
    - Grand Rabbi Shulem Yoseph Twersky (born 1883 at Turisk, died February 8, 1945, in New York City), son of Rabbi Mordechai Zishe
      - Grand Rabbi Sroyahu Yonah Twersky, great-grandson of Rabbi Shulem Yoseph.
    - Grand Rabbi David Twersky of Buhusi (born 1884 at Turisk, died December 9, 1933, in Iasi), son of Rabbi Mordechai Zishe and son-in-law of Rabbi Yisroel Sholom Yosef Friedman of Bohush
    - Grand Rabbi Yakov Leib Twersky (born 1885 at Turisk, died October 12, 1979, in Bnei Brak, Israel), son of Rabbi Mordechai Zishe
      - Grand Rabbi Chaim Menachem Avrohom Twersky (born February 27, 1915, at Zinkov, died December 1, 2010, at Hackney, London), son of Rabbi Yakov Leib
        - Grand Rabbi Mordechai Zisye Twersky, son of Rabbi Chaim Menachem Avrohom
      - Grand Rabbi Pinchos Twersky of Trisk-London (born May 17, 1916, at Zinkov, died August 12, 2001, at London), son of Rabbi Yakov Leib
        - Grand Rabbi Menachem Mendel Matisyohu Twersky of London (born December 9, 1946, at London), son of Rabbi Pinchos
          - Grand Rabbi Yitzchok Duvid Twersky of Trisk-Tolna. Son of Rabbi Menachem Mendel Matisyohu
  - Grand Rabbi Moishe Yide Leib Twersky of Chelem (born 1873 at Tolna, died 1938 at Warsaw, Poland), second son of Rabbi Menachem Nuchem
- Grand Rabbi Mordche Twersky of Kozmir (born 1840, died June 20, 1915, at Kielce), second son of Grand Rabbi Avraham.
- Grand Rabbi Yaakov Aryeh Leib Twersky of Trisk-Hrubieszow (born 1847 at Turisk, died May 10, 1918, in Gmina Hrubieszów, Lublin), third son of Grand Rabbi Avraham.
  - Grand Rabbi Moshe Mordechei Twersky (born 1877 at Turisk, perished May 13, 1943, at Bełżec extermination camp), son of Rabbi Yaakov Aryeh Leib
  - Grand Rabbi Moshe Mordechai Eichenstein, Trisker Rebbe of Yerushalayim, The great-grandson of Grand Rabbi Moshe Mordechai of Trisk.
