= Isadore Twersky =

American rabbi (1930–1997)

Rabbi Isadore Twersky
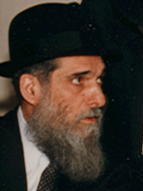

Personal life
- Born: Isadore Asher Twersky; 9 October 1930 Boston, Massachusetts
- Died: 12 October 1997 (aged 67) Boston
- Spouse: Atarah (née Soloveitchik)
- Children: 3
- Education: Harvard University; Hebrew University of Jerusalem

Religious life
- Religion: Judaism
- Synagogue: Congregation Beth David
- Position: Rabbi
- Residence: Brookline, Massachusetts

Isadore Twersky (also known as Yitzhak Asher Twersky, October 9, 1930 – October 12, 1997) was an Orthodox rabbi and Hasidic Rebbe, and university professor who held the position as Nathan Littauer Professor of Hebrew Literature and Philosophy at Harvard University, a chair previously held by Harry Austryn Wolfson. Twersky was an internationally recognized authority on Rabbinic literature and Jewish philosophy. He was especially known as an international expert in the writings and influence of the 12th-century Jewish legalist and philosopher Maimonides, and Abraham ben David, the Rabad of Posquieres.

His best-known works are, An Introduction to the Code of Maimonides (Mishneh Torah), and the more popular anthology, A Maimonides Reader, as well as Rabad of Posquieres: A Twelfth-Century Talmudist, which was based on his doctorate work. He was the editor of the Harvard Studies in Medieval Jewish History and Literature (in three volumes), won a Guggenheim Fellowship in 1989, and was a fellow of both the American Academy for Jewish Research and the American Academy of Arts and Sciences. According to Hacker (2005), Twersky can best be characterized as a "historian of ideas and a researcher of the intellectual history of the Jews," and would presumably have considered himself as such.

== Biography ==
Twersky was born in Boston in 1930, and attended Boston Latin School and Hebrew College, which was then known as Hebrew Teachers' College. Much of his Torah knowledge was acquired through private study under the tutelage of his father Meshullam Zushe Twersky (his predecessor as the Talner Rebbe of Boston) and his future father-in-law Joseph B. Soloveitchik, rather than through formal yeshiva instruction (Hacker 2005). He then graduated from Harvard in 1952, where he majored in history. In 1949, he spent a year at the Hebrew University of Jerusalem.

Upon his graduation from Harvard, he began studies toward a doctorate in Near Eastern Languages and Civilizations, under the guidance of the scholar of medieval philosophy, Harry Austryn Wolfson. The subject of his doctorate was the twelfth century Provençal Talmudist, Abraham ben David of Posquières (Rabad). Published under the title Rabad of Posquières: A Twelfth-Century Talmudist, it was one of the first academic portraits of a Talmudist written at an American university (Septimus 2005).

Twersky succeeded his father Meshullam Zalman Twersky as the Talner Rebbe of Boston for the last twenty years of his life, serving as the spiritual leader of Congregation Beth David, known colloquially as the Talner Beis Medrash ("the Talner study hall"), which was located in a renovated house in the Brighton neighborhood of Boston. Twersky's lectures in the synagogue on Tuesday nights and late Saturday afternoons were known for their erudition and originality, in the tradition of elite religious Torah study, with the vocabulary and worldliness of a Harvard historian. Twersky and his wife Atarah (née Soloveitchik) played a prominent part in the leadership of Maimonides School. Twersky took on the role of spiritual leader for the school in 1993, after the death of Atarah's father Joseph B. Soloveitchik, who had founded the school in 1937. Atarah was the long-time chair of the School Committee, until 2006, nine years after Twersky's death. She died on February 24, 2023. The Twerskys' elder son Mosheh, a rabbi and lecturer at Yeshivas Toras Moshe, was murdered in the 2014 Jerusalem synagogue attack. Their other son, Mayer Twersky, holds the Leib Merkin Distinguished Professorial Chair in Talmud and Jewish Philosophy and is a rosh yeshiva at Yeshiva University and rabbi of the Talner Synagogue of Riverdale. Their daughter Tzipporah Rosenblatt, a lawyer, is married to Jonathan Rosenblatt, rabbi emeritus of the Riverdale Jewish Center in New York City.

== Teaching and research ==
Twersky was a pioneer in the introduction of the methodology of the History of ideas, first developed by Arthur O. Lovejoy, into Jewish Intellectual history. He also devoted special emphasis upon the interaction between law and spirituality in the History of Judaism. He founded the Center for Jewish Studies in 1978 and served as its director until 1993.

His research in some respects resembled that of his contemporary and friend Alexander Altmann (Hacker 2005), and his work on Jewish rationalist philosophy brought him into conflict with scholars such as Gershom Scholem and Shlomo Pines, who viewed the medieval rational philosophy typified by Rambam as an alien parasite grafted onto traditional Judaism (Septimus 2005). There has been noted a certain irony in the affection given to this greatest of Jewish rationalists by the descendant of an illustrious Hasidic dynasty (it being the case by and large that Hasidic doctrine has stronger affinity for the mystical over the strictly rational), but Septimus (2005) sees here a coherent and unified search for the spiritual within the rational.

At Harvard, Twersky taught both undergraduate and graduate students. His popular course, Moderation and Extremism, which compared and contrasted the paths to virtue in the works of Aristotle, Maimonides, and Thomas Aquinas, drew over 200 students in 1995, the final year it was taught. Over the course of his thirty years at Harvard, he taught a large number of graduate students. His exacting standards and expectations were legendary. Nevertheless, over thirty individuals completed their doctorates under his guidance. Many of these play leading roles in Jewish studies, both in North America and in Israel. Among these are Edward Breuer (Hebrew University), Bernard Dov Cooperman (University of Maryland), Joseph M. Davis (Gratz College), Lois Dubin (Smith College), David Fishman (Jewish Theological Seminary), Talya Fishman (University of Pennsylvania), Roman A. Foxbrunner, Daniel Frank (Ohio State University), Steven Harvey (Bar Ilan University), Carmi Horowitz (Michlelet Yerushalayim, Jerusalem), Eric Lawee (Bar Ilan University), Diana Lobel (Boston University), David Malkiel (Bar Ilan University), Allan Nadler (Drew University), Ira Robinson (Concordia University), Marc Saperstein (Leo Baeck College, London), Mark (Meir) Sendor, Jacob J. Schacter (Yeshiva University), Bernard Septimus (Harvard University), Marc Shapiro (University of Scranton), Michael Shmidman (Touro University), David Sklare (Machon Ben Zvi), Gregg Stern, Adena Tannenbaum (Ohio State University), Joshua Levisohn, and Jeffrey R. Woolf (Bar Ilan University).

== Family tree ==
Brisker family tree

Rabbanit Esti Rosenberg, director of Migdal Oz (seminary)
Rabbi Yitzchok Lichtenstein, Co-Rosh Yeshiva of Yeshiva Torah Vodaas; Rabbi Bais Avrohom, Monsey, NY
Rabbi Yosef Dov (Reb Berel) Soloveichik	Rabbi Avrohom Yehoshua Soloveichik	Rabbi Mosheh Lichtenstein, Co-Rosh Yeshiva of Yeshivat Har Etzion
Rabbi Meshulam Dovid (Reb Dovid) Soloveichik	Rabbi Yitzchak Zev Soloveichik	Rabbi Mayer Lichtenstein, Rabbi Ohel Menachem Bet Shemesh
Rabbi Yosef Dov (HaLevi) Soloveichik author of Beis HaLevi	Rabbi Chaim Soloveichik "Reb Chaim Brisker"	Rabbi Yitzchak Zev (Reb Velvel) Soloveichik "The GRIZ"; The Brisker Rov	Lifsha Soloveitchik Feinstein	Dr. Tovah Soloveitchik Lichtenstein	Rabbi Jonathan Rosenblatt
Rabbi Refael Shapiro, Rosh Yeshiva of Volozhin yeshiva	Lifsha Shapiro	Rabbi Refoel Soloveichik	Rabbi Dr. Aharon Lichtenstein	Tzipporah Rosenblatt
Rabbi Meir Soloveichik	Dr. Atarah Soloveitchik Twersky	Rabbi Mosheh Twersky z"l, Maggid Shiur at Yeshiva Toras Moshe
Rabbi Dr. Joseph B. (Yosef Dov) Soloveitchik "The Rav"	Rabbi Dr. Isadore Twersky, Talner Rebbe of Boston	Rabbi Mayer Twersky, Rosh Yeshiva at Rabbi Isaac Elchanan Theological Seminary
Rabbi Moshe Soloveichik	Rabbi Ahron Soloveichik	Rabbi Dr. Haym Soloveitchik	Rabbi Moshe Soloveichik, Rosh Yeshivas Brisk (Chicago); Rav of Kehilas Beth Sholom Ahavas Achim
Peshka Feinstein Soloveichik	Dr. Samuel Soloveichik	Rabbi Eliyahu Soloveichik, Rosh Yeshiva at Lander College's Beis Medrash L'Talmud	Rabbi Meir Yaakov Soloveichik
Shulamit Soloveitchik Meiselman	Rabbi Moshe Meiselman, Rosh Yeshiva of Yeshiva Toras Moshe	Rabbi Yosef Soloveichik	Sarah Orenshein
Anne Soloveitchik Gerber	Rabbi Chayim Soloveichik, Maggid Shiur at Yeshivat Reishit; Morah D’Asrah of Kehillat Ohr Shalom, Ramat Beit Shemesh	Moshe Soloveichik
Rabbi Yosef Dov Soloveichik	Rabbi Shmuel Chaim Soloveichik
Rabbi Yitzchok Soloveichik	Rabbi Yisroel Soloveichik
Rabbi Yisroel Gershon Soloveichik	Rabbi Moshe Soloveichik	Rabbi Boruch Soloveichik
Rabbi Avraham Yeshaya Soloveichik
Daughter Soloveichik

Notes:
- Rabbi Chaim Halevi Soloveichik (the second)

== Awards ==
1981: National Jewish Book Award in the Jewish Thought category for Introduction to the Code of Maimonides
