= David Twersky (Skverer Rebbe) =

Romanian–American grand rabbi New Square

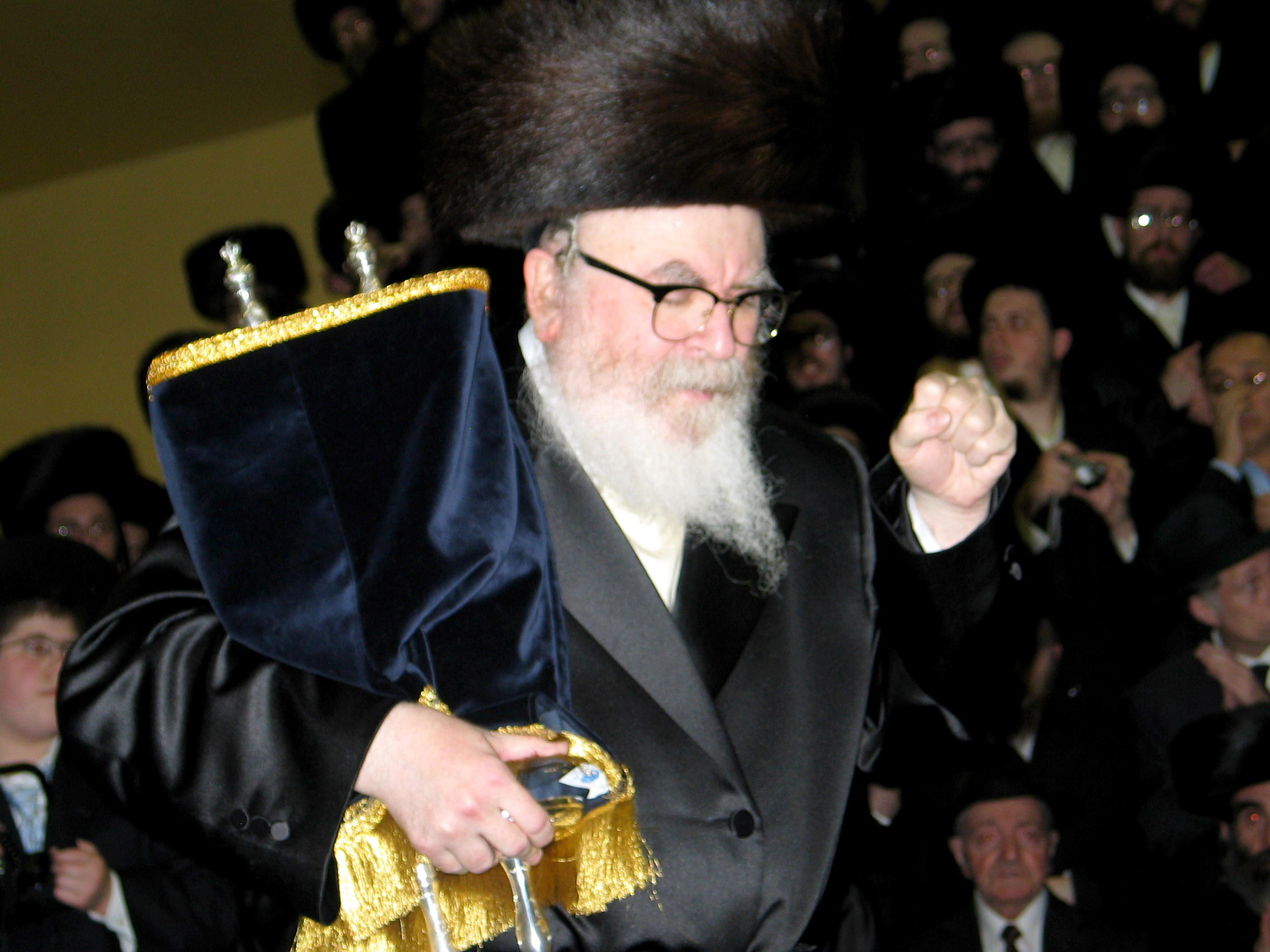
- Twersky dancing with Torah (2005)
- Title: Skverer Rebbe of New Square

Personal life
- Born: David Twersky; 1940 or 1941 (age 85–86) Iaşi, Romania
- Children: 7
- Dynasty: Skver

Religious life
- Religion: Judaism

Jewish leader
- Predecessor: Yakov Yosef Twersky
- Began: April 1968
- Dynasty: Skver

David Twersky, originally spelled Twerski (born 1940 or 1941), is the Grand Rabbi and spiritual leader of the village of New Square, New York, and of Skverer Hasidism worldwide.

== Early life ==
Twersky was born in Iaşi, Romania. In 1945, at the end of World War II, his family moved to Bucharest. In 1947, they emigrated to the United States, where they settled in Borough Park, Brooklyn, and later in nearby Williamsburg. Twersky's father, Yakov Yosef Twersky, established the all-Hasidic village of New Square in Rockland County in 1954.

== Family ==
At the age of 18, Twersky married the late Chaya Chana Hager, the elder daughter of the Vizhnitzer Rebbe of Bnei Brak, Israel, Moshe Yehoshua Hager. The couple had four sons and three daughters. Twersky's wife Chaya Chana died in 2024, and was predeceased by her daughter Tziporah Goldman, who died in 2022.

== As Grand Rabbi ==
In April 1968, following his father's death, Twersky assumed the leadership of New Square, and of Skverer Hasidim worldwide. According to The Jewish Daily Forward, most New Square residents "revere their rebbe as a Saint, and look to him for guidance on all issues", showing their devotion, singing and praying at his weekly "tish". The Forward also reports that Twersky lights his Hanukkah candles on a large sterling silver menorah that a wealthy follower bought him. He exerts authority through a body of about fifteen persons appointed by him, known as "the Kehilla".

In November of 2021, Twersky hosted Russia's Chief Rabbi Berel Lazar and Iran's Chief Rabbi Yehuda Gerami at his home to learn about Jewish life in Iran and Chabad's ongoing involvement in support of that community. In January 2024, Twersky organized a trip to Krakow in order to raise money towards the building of a new grand synagogue in New Square. Two hundred community members pledging $100,000 each signed up for the trip.

=== Political influence ===
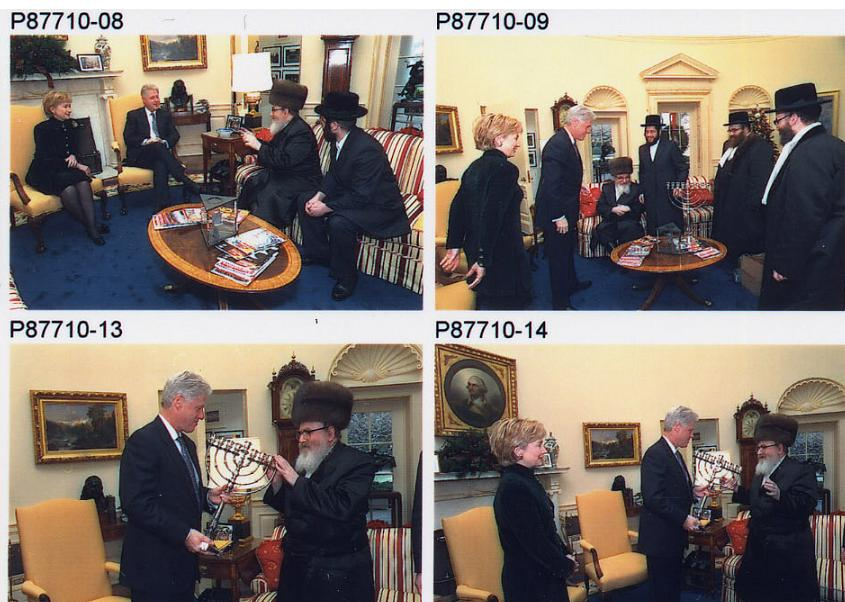
Twersky in the White House on Hanukkah in 2000 with then-President and First Lady Bill and Hillary Clinton

As in many Hasidic communities, the community in New Square tends to exercise its voting power as a bloc, under the guidance of the Grand Rabbi. He usually supports incumbents or those likely to win, putting the community in a good position to receive government support.

In 1992, New Square voted 822 for President George Bush, to 93 for Bill Clinton. In 1996, voters supported President Clinton over Bob Dole, 1,110 to 31. In 1994, voters backed Mario Cuomo against George Pataki, 907 to 63, and in 1998, voters backed Governor Pataki over Democrat Peter Vallone, 1,132 to 8. In November 2000, vice president Al Gore received more votes than George W. Bush, 1,388 to 25, after the former visited Twersky in February of the year. During the 2000 Senate campaign, First Lady Hillary Clinton visited Rabbi Twersky and his wife in New Square, while running for the U.S. Senate, and received nearly 100 percent of the local vote. Twersky was invited to the White House in December 2000 (Hanukkah 5761), and secured commutations for the criminal sentences of four Skver Hasidim, who had been convicted of defrauding the government of more than 30 million dollars to benefit the educational institutions of New Square.

=== Attitude towards sexual abuse cases ===
Twersky has been accused by multiple community members of dismissing out of hand allegations of sexual abuse of children allegedly committed by other community members. In one instance of this, upon being informed of a case of ongoing sexual abuse having been perpetrated on a victim by his teacher for five years, Twersky replied in Yiddish: איך וויס נישט, און איך גלייב נישט!, romanized: Ich veis nisht, in ich gleib nisht! (lit. 'I don't know it, and I don't believe it!') Another abuse victim who sought his council, said he told her, "[D]on't ever tell anyone you spoke to me about it!!!"

== See also ==
- Chernobyl (Hasidic dynasty)
