= Aaron Twersky of Chernobyl =

Ukrainian rabbi

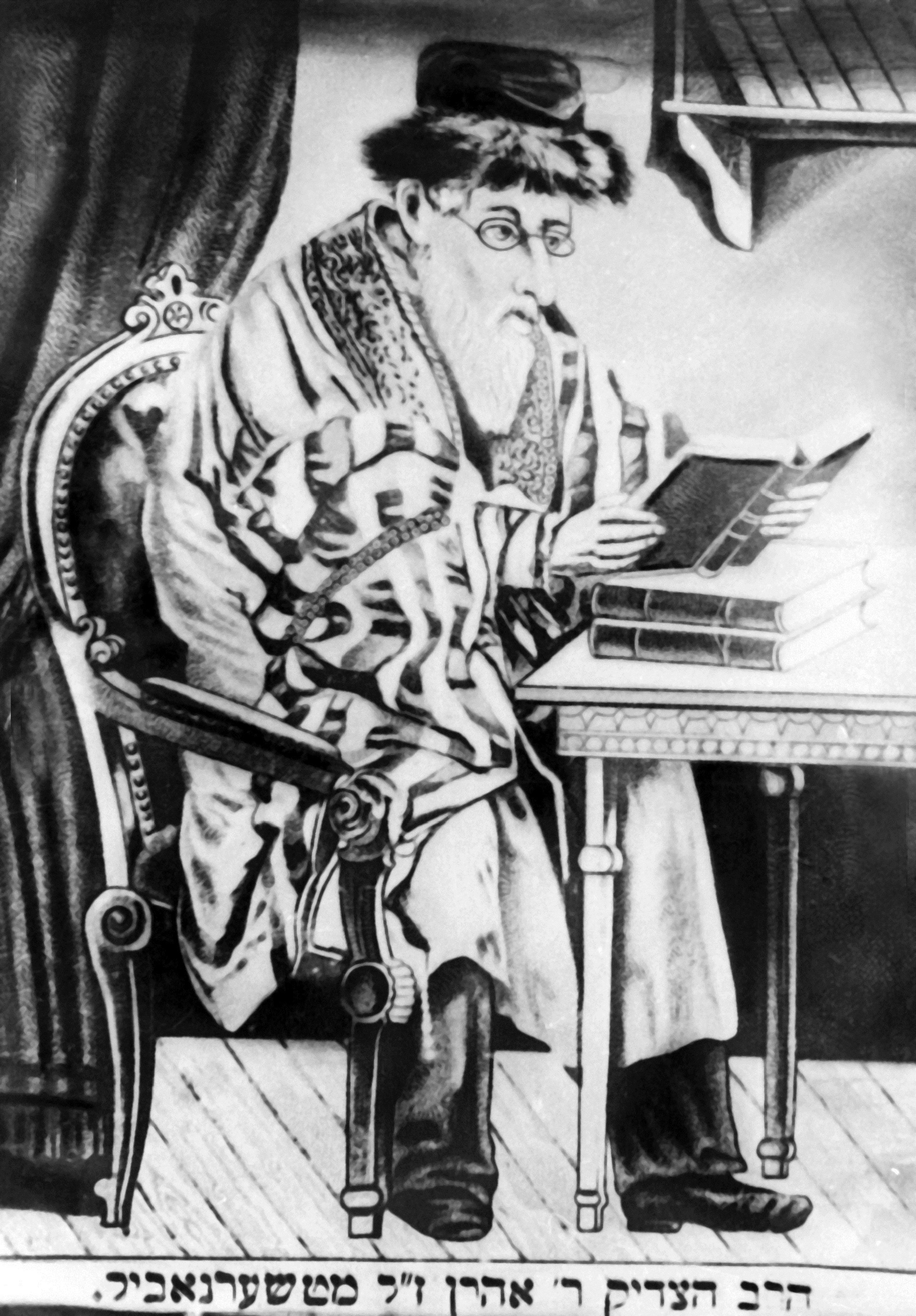
- Title: Chernobler Rebbe

Personal life
- Born: Aaron Twersky; 1784 Chernobyl
- Died: 21 November 1871 (aged 86–87) Chernobyl
- Spouse: dau. of Gedalyo of Linitz, dau. of Tsvi of Korostshev
- Children: Chayo Soro, Perl, Menachem Nochum, Yeshayo Meshulom Zishe, Boruch Osher, Feygl
- Parents: Mordechai Twersky (father); Chayo Soro (mother)
- Dynasty: Chernobyl

Religious life
- Religion: Judaism

Jewish leader
- Predecessor: Chernobler Magid
- Successor: Yeshayo Meshulom Zishe Twersky; Boruch Osher Twersky
- Began: 1837
- Ended: 21 November 1871
- Dynasty: Chernobyl

Aaron Twersky of Chernobyl (1784 – 21 November 1871) was a Ukrainian rabbi. He succeeded his father Rabbi Mordechai Twersky as rebbe of the Chernobler chasidim.

== Biography ==
Aaron Twersky was born in Chernobyl in 1784, the first-born of Rabbi Mordechai Twersky and Chayo Soro (daughter of Rabbi Aaron the Great of Karlin).

He received his education from his grandfather, Rabbi Menachem Nachum Twersky of Chernobyl.

He married the daughter of Rabbi Gedalyo of Linits (author of Teshuos Chein). They had two daughters, Chayo Soro (who married Yisroel, grandson of Rabbi Nachman of Breslov) and Perl (who married Rabbi Yitschok of Berezne).

Twersky later married the daughter of Rabbi Tsvi of Korostyshiv. They had three sons – Menachem Nochum of Loiev, Yeshayo Meshulom Zishe of Chernobyl and Boruch Osher of Chernobyl – and a daughter, Feygl, who married Rabbi Duvid Moshe Friedman of Czortków.

He wrote an approbation to Or laYshorim by Rabbi Yechiel Michel Epstein.
