= Rachmastrivka (Hasidic dynasty) =

Rachmastrivka Hasidic Dynasty
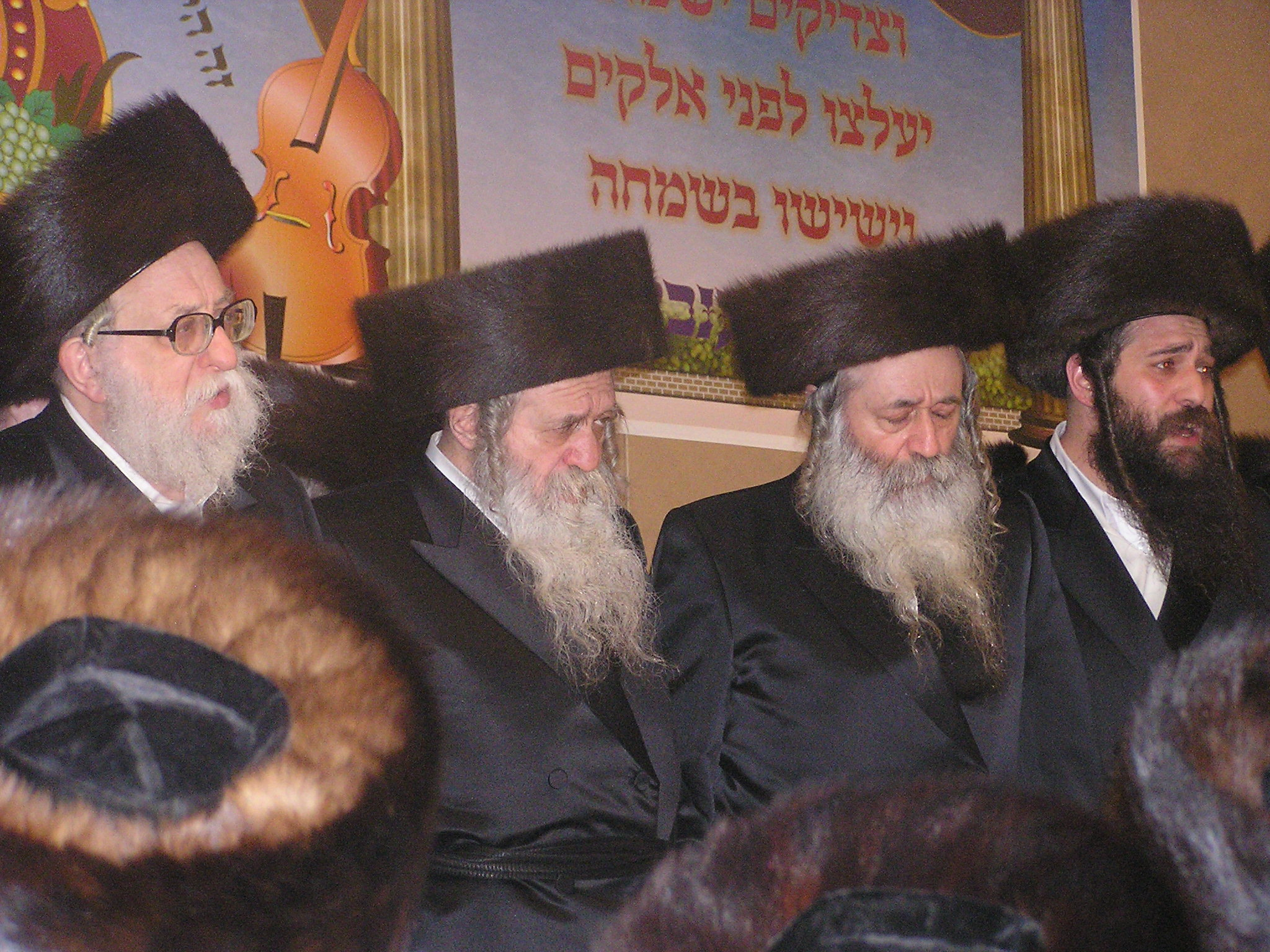
- Rachmastrivka Rebbe Rabbi Chai Yitzchok Twersky (far left) with the Rebbes of Chernobyl

Founder
- Rabbi Yochanan Twersky

Regions with significant populations
- Israel, United States

Religions
- Hasidic Judaism

Rachmastrivka is a Hasidic dynasty named after the town of Rotmistrivka, Ukraine. It is an offshoot of the Chernobyl dynasty dating back to the 19th century.

The founder of the dynasty, Rebbe Yochanan Twersky (1816-1895), was the youngest son of Rebbe Mordechai Twersky, the Maggid of Chernobyl. He was the son-in-law of Rabbi Pinchos of Kalk. He died on March 29, 1895 (4 Nisan 5655) in Rachmastrivka.

There are currently eight rebbes, whose courts are located in Jerusalem, in Borough Park, Brooklyn, in Lakewood Township, New Jersey, in Linden, New Jersey, in Monsey, NY, in Williamsburg, Brooklyn, and in Spring Valley, NY. Rav Duvid is currently the Rebbe in Jerusalem, Rav Duvid Moshe Twerski is currently the Rebbe in Borough Park, Rav Yisochar Dov is currently the Rebbe in Lakewood, Rav Yehoshua is currently Rebbe in Monsey, Rav Yakov Yosef is currently Rebbe in Linden NJ, Rav Zishe is currently Rebbe in Williamsburg, Rav Menachem Nochum Twersky is currently the Rebbe in the Oak and Vine neighborhood in Lakewood, and Rav Yakov Yosef Twersky (Son of Reb Mottel, oldest son of the rabbi that died) is Rebbe in Spring Valley.

Rachmastrivka is one of the larger Hasidic groups. The two rebbes had a close relationship with no tension between them. This has continued into the next generation; the new rebbe in Jerusalem visited New York on September 14, 2006, and stayed with his uncle.

== Lineage of the Rachmastrivka dynasty ==
Rebbe Yochanan Twersky, founder of the Rachmastrivka dynasty, was the youngest son of the Chernobler Maggid, Rebbe Mordechai Twersky. Rebbe Mordechai's father, Rebbe Menachem Nachum Twersky of Chernobyl (author of Meor Einayim), was a disciple of the Baal Shem Tov, the founder of Hasidism.

- Rebbe Yochanan Twersky of Rachmastrivka (1816–1895) – son of the Magid of Chernobyl.
  - Rebbe Duvid Twersky of Zlatipoli (died 1915) – son of the Rebbe Yochanan of Rachmastrivka.
    - Rebbe Mordchai Yoseph of Zlatipoli (died 1939) – only son of the Rebbe Duvid Twersky of Zlatipoli.
      - Rebbe Tzvi Aryeh of Zlatipoli - son of the Rebbe Mordchai Yoseph of Zlatipoli.
        - Rabbi Pinchos Biberfeld (1915–1999) - son-in-law of Rebbe Tsvi Arye
  - Rebbe Mordechai of Rachmastrivka (died 1921, Jerusalem)
  - Rebbe Menachem Nochum Twersky of Rachmastrivka (died 1937) - son of Rebbe Yochanan.
    - Rebbe Yaakov Yosef Twersky of Stanislav (Very well respected Hassidic Rebbe in Vienna, and a part of a group of Zionist Hassidic Rebbes - Was close to Theodor Herzl )
    - Rebbe Avrohom Dov - son of Rebbe Menachem Nochum
    - Rebbe Duvid (David) Twersky of Rachmastrivka (1872–1950) - son of Rebbe Menachem Nochum.
      - Rebbe Yochanan Twersky (1903–1982) of Rachmastrivka – son of Rebbe Duvid.
        - Rebbe Chai Yitzchok (Isaac) Twersky of Rachmastrivka-Boro Park – Previous Rachmastrivka Rebbe of Boro Park (1931–2023) son of Rebbe Yochanan - son-in-law of Rebbe Yaakov Yosef Twersky (1899–1968) of Skver.
          - Rebbe Duvid Moshe Twersky of Rachmastrivka-Boro Park – present Rachmastrivka Rebbe of Boro Park - son of Rebbe Chai Yitzchok.
          - Rebbe Yisachar Dov Twersky of Rachmastrivka-Lakewood – present Rachmastrivka Rebbe of Lakewood - son of Rebbe Chai Yitzchok.
          - Rebbe Yehoshua Twersky of Rachmastrivka-Monsey – present Rachmastrivka Rebbe of Monsey - son of Rebbe Chai Yitzchok.
          - Rebbe Yakov Yosef Twersky of Rachmastrivka-Linden – present Rachmastrivka Rebbe of Linden - son of Rebbe Chai Yitzchok.
          - Rebbe Zisha Twersky of Rachmastrivka-Williamsburg – present Rachmastrivka Rebbe of Williamsburg - son of Rebbe Chai Yitzchok.
          - Rebbe Menachem Nochum Twersky of Rachmastrivka-Oak and Vine – present Rachmastrivka Rebbe of Oak and Vine, Lakewood - son of Rebbe Chai Yitzchok.
          - Rebbe Yakov Yosef Twersky of Rachmastrivka-Spring Valley – present Rachmastrivka Rebbe of Spring Valley - Grand-son of Rebbe Chai Yitzchok.
        - Rebbe Yisroel Mordechai (Israel Mordecai) Twersky (1929–2004) of Rachmastrivka-Yerushalayim – previous Rachmastrivka Rebbe of Jerusalem - son of Rebbe Yochanan.
          - Rebbe Duvid (David) Twersky of Rachmastrivka-Yerushalayim – present Rachmastrivka Rebbe of Jerusalem - eldest son of Rebbe Yisroel Mordechai
          - Rabbi Nachman Yosef Twersky – second son of Rebbe Yisroel Mordechai (lives in Crown Heights and is a Lubavitcher chasid, and teaches in the Chabad yeshivah Oholei Torah).

== See also ==
- Chernobyl (Hasidic dynasty)
