= Yakov Yosef Twersky =

Grand Rabbi of Skver

- Title: Skverer Rebbe of New Square.

Personal life
- Born: Yakov Yosef Twersky; June 23, 1899
- Died: March 31, 1968 (aged 68) New Square, NY
- Spouse: Trana Twersky
- Children: Figa Malka Hager, Sima Mirel Hager, Miriam Twersky, Rabbi David Twersky
- Dynasty: Skver

Religious life
- Religion: Judaism

Jewish leader
- Predecessor: Rabbi Dovid'l Twersky
- Successor: Rabbi David Twersky
- Dynasty: Skver

Rabbi Yakov Yosef Twersky (June 23, 1899 – March 31, 1968) was the Grand Rabbi and spiritual leader of the village of New Square, New York, and of Skverer Hasidism worldwide.

== Biography ==
Born in Ukraine, Twersky was a Holocaust survivor. In 1950, he arrived in the United States and lived in Williamsburg, Brooklyn. In 1956, Twersky founded the first shtetl in the United States, the village of New Square in Rockland County, New York.

=== Family ===
==== Lineage from Ba'al Shem Tov ====
- Ba'al Shem Tov
  - Rabbi Tzvi
    - Rabbi Aaron of Tituv
      - Rabbi Tzvi of Tituv (Hershele Skverer)
        - Chana Sima (married Rabbi Yitzchak Twerski of Skvira)
          - Rabbi David Twersky of Skvira
            - Rabbi Yakov Yosef Twersky

==== Lineage from Rabbi Menachem Nachum Twerski of Chernobyl ====
- Rabbi Menachem Nachum Twerski of Chernobyl
  - Rabbi Mordechai Twersky of Chernobyl
    - Rabbi Yitzchak Twersky of Skvira
      - Rabbi David Twersky of Skvira
        - Rabbi Yakov Yosef Twersky

After his passing, his son Rabbi David Twersky succeeded him as the grand rabbi of the Skverer Hasidim.

== Bibliography ==
- Bikdusha Shel Ma'la, Biography of Rabbi Yakov Yosef (Twerski) of Skver, by Mechon Mishkenos Yakov, 2005
