= Mordechai Twersky =

Ukrainian rabbi

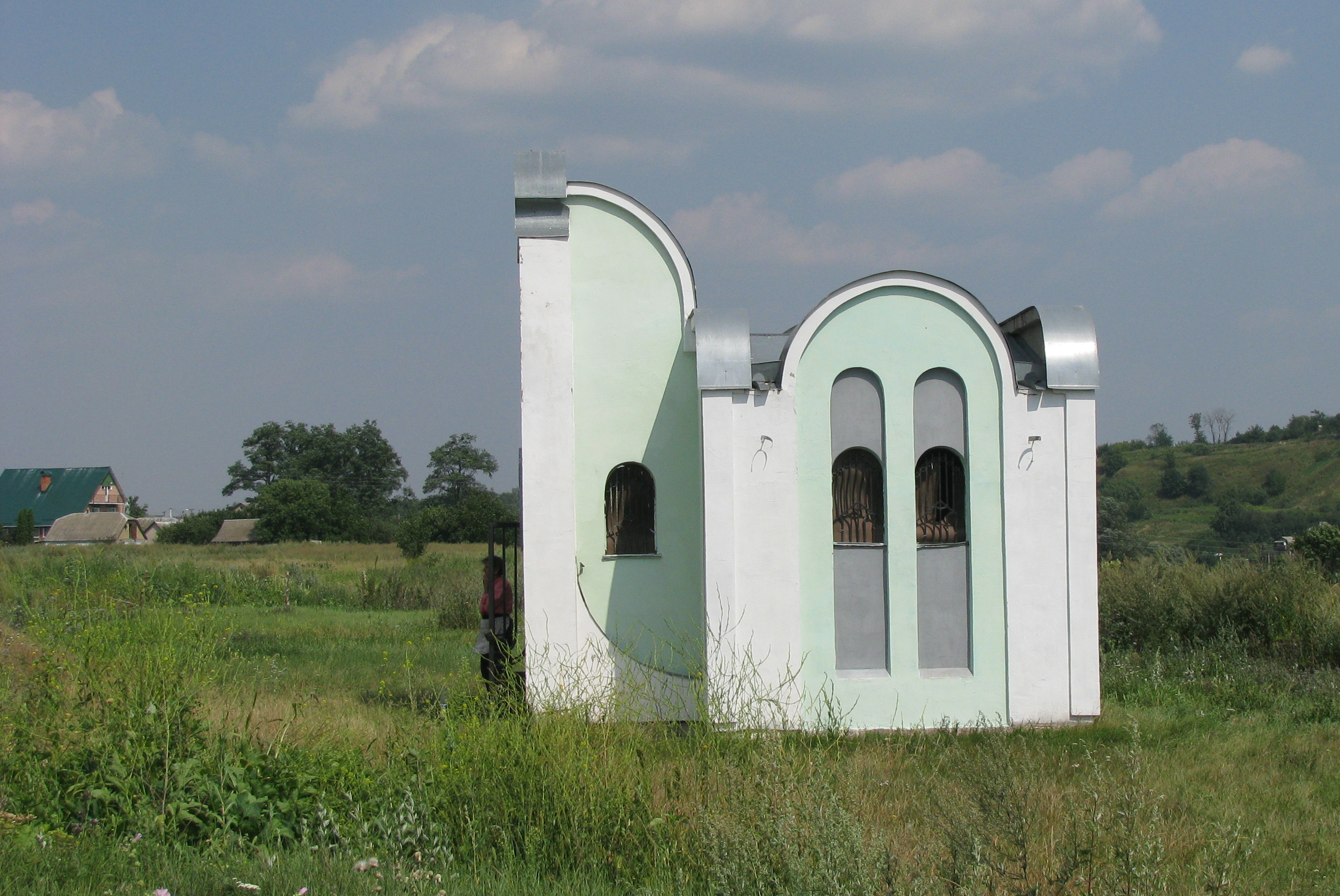
- Twersky's tomb
- Title: Chornobyler Maggid

Personal life
- Born: Mordechai Twersky c. 1770
- Died: May 1837 (20 Iyar 5597)
- Buried: Hnativka, near Kyiv
- Spouse: Chaya Soro (daughter of Aharon of Karlin), Feygele (daughter of Dovid Leikes)
- Children: Aaron Twersky of Chernobyl; Moshe Twersky of Korostyshiv; Yaakov Yisroel Twersky of Cherkasy; Malka, Menachem Nochum Twersky of Makariv; Avrohom Twersky of Trisk; Dovid Twersky of Talne; Yitschok Twersky of Skvira; Yochonon Twersky of Rakhmastrivka; Chana Chaya Twersky
- Parents: Menachem Nachum Twersky (father); Soro Shapira (mother)
- Dynasty: Chernobyl

Religious life
- Religion: Judaism

Jewish leader
- Predecessor: Menachem Nachum Twersky
- Successor: Aaron Twersky of Chornobyl
- Began: 1798
- Ended: 1837
- Main work: Likutei Tora
- Dynasty: Chernobyl

Mordechai Twersky (c. 1770–1837), known as Motele, was a Ukrainian rabbi. He was the son of Rabbi Menachem Nachum Twersky of Chernobyl and the second rebbe of the Chernobyl Hasidic dynasty. The family surname is Russian for "native of Tver", although Hasidic tradition connects it with the city of Tiberias. Seven of his eight sons were rebbes, from whom several branches of Hasidism emerged, including Skver, Chernobyl and Rachmastrivka.

== Biography ==
Twersky was born in Chernobyl to Sarah and Rabbi Menachem Nachum of Chernobyl, a disciple of the Baal Shem Tov and the Maggid of Mezeritch and author of the book Me'or Einayim.

Twersky married Chaya Sara the daughter of Rabbi Aharon of Karlin; after her death he married Faiga the daughter of Rabbi Dovid Leykes who was a student of the Baal Shem Tov.

According to local Hasidic tradition, Twersky visited the town of Volodymyrets twice. During his first visit, Twersky refused to sleep in the bed prepared for him. After rejecting several other beds, he finally agreed to sleep in a dilapidated bed; the family heirloom of a local Hasid.

His thoughts, sermons and discourses were published in his book Likutei Torah.
