= Menachem Nachum Twersky =

Ukrainian rabbi

Menachem Nochum Twersky (1730-1797), also known as the Me'or Einayim (Hebrew: מאור עיניים), was a Ukrainian rabbi, and the founder of the Chernobyl Hasidic dynasty. He was a disciple of the Baal Shem Tov and Dov Ber of Mezeritch, and published one of the first works of Hasidic thought. He is considered one of the pioneer rebbes of Hasidism.

== Biography ==
Twersky was born in Norynsk, Volhynia, and orphaned as a child. He was raised by his uncle Nochum, who sent him to be educated in one of the highly acclaimed yeshivot in Lithuania. After marrying, he became a teacher, while continuing his intensive studies of Torah.

With the advent of Hasidic Judaism, Twersky became a disciple of the Baal Shem Tov, the founder of Hasidism. After the Baal Shem Tov's death, Twersky accepted Dov Ber of Mezeritch as his mentor. His book, Me'or Einayim 'Light of the Eyes', was published after his death and contains a collection of his homilies concerning the weekly Torah portions and selections of the Talmud. The book gained widespread acceptance as one of the major works of Hasidic thought. He died in Chernobyl, Polish–Lithuanian Commonwealth in 1797.

== Legacy ==
He was succeeded as the Maggid of Chernobyl by his son, Mordechai Twersky. Seven of Mordechai's eight sons became rebbes, including those of Skver, Rachmastrivka, Trisk, and Talna.

Twersky's daughter, Malka, married Avraham, a rabbi of Korostyshiv. Their daughter, Chava, wife of Sholom Shachne of Prohobisht, was the mother of Yisroel Friedman of Ruzhin.

== Me'or Einayim ==
Twersky's homilies were later collected in the books Me'or Einayim and Yesamach Lev (lit. 'The light of the eyes makes the heart happy'); They are often published together. They have gained widespread acceptance as major works and foundations of Hasidic ideology. Me'or Einayim comprises Hasidic insights on the weekly Torah portion and Jewish holidays, influenced by Kabbalah; it was edited by his student Eliyah.

The Yesamach Lev collects Twersky's insights on Aggadah.
