= List of Hasidic dynasties and groups =

A Hasidic dynasty or Chassidic dynasty is a dynasty led by Hasidic Jewish spiritual leaders known as rebbes, and usually has some or all of the following characteristics:

- Each leader of the dynasty is referred to as an ADMOR (abbreviation for Adoneinu Moreinu Verabeinu – "our master, our teacher, and our rabbi"), or simply as Rebbe (or "the Rebbe"), and at times called the "Rav" ("rabbi"), and sometimes referred to in English as a "Grand Rabbi";
- The dynasty continues beyond the initial leader's lifetime by succession (usually by a family descendant);
- The dynasty is usually named after a key town in Eastern Europe where the founder may have been born or lived, and sometimes, such as in the case of the Bostoner Chassidim, where the group began to grow and flourish or where a significantly influential Jewish teacher founds a court or yeshiva where students go to learn from, or consult with, that Rebbe;
- The dynasty has (or once had) followers who, through time, continue following successive leaders (rebbes), or may even continue as a group without a leader by following the precepts of a deceased leader.

Distinguished from a dynasty, a Hasidic group or Chassidic group has the following characteristics:

- It was founded by a leader who did not appoint or leave a successor;
- It may be named after a key town in Eastern Europe where the founder may have been born or lived, or where the group began to grow and flourish, or it may be named after the founder himself;
- It has followers who continue as a group under the direction of rabbis who expound and interpret the precepts of the deceased founder.

== Dynasties with larger following ==
Hasidic dynasties (arranged alphabetically) with a large following include:

Name	Current (or last) Rebbe	Founder	Presently headquartered In	City / Town of origin
Belz (Machnovka-Belz)	Yissachar Dov Rokeach Yehoshua Rokeach	Sholom Rokeach (1781–1855)	Jerusalem, Israel	Belz, Galicia, Austria-Hungary / Poland (now in Ukraine)
Bobov (Bobov-45)	Ben Zion Aryeh Leibish Halberstam Mordechai Dovid Unger (b. 1954)	Shlomo Halberstam of Bobov (1847–1905)	Borough Park, Brooklyn	Bobowa and Sanz, Galicia, Austria-Hungary (now in Poland)
Chabad Lubavitch	Menachem Mendel Schneerson (1902–1994)	Schneur Zalman of Liadi (1745–1812)	Crown Heights, Brooklyn	Lyubavichi, Polish-Lithuanian Commonwealth, later Russia
Ger	Yaakov Aryeh Alter (b. 1939); Shaul Alter (Kehilas Pnei Menachem)	Yitzchak Meir Alter (1799–1866)	Jerusalem, Israel	Góra Kalwaria, Russian Empire (now in Poland)
Karlin-Stolin	Baruch Meir Yaakov Shochet	Aaron ben Jacob of Karlin (1736–1772)	Givat Zeev, Jerusalem, Israel	Karlin, [Polish-Lithuanian Commonwealth, later Belarus]
Sanz-Klausenburg	Tzvi Elimelech Halberstam; Shmuel Dovid Halberstam	Chaim Halberstam of Sanz (1796–1876)	Kiryat Sanz, Netanya, Israel; Borough Park, Brooklyn	Kolozsvár, Klausenburg, Kingdom of Hungary (now Cluj Napoca, Romania), and Sanz, Galicia, Habsburg Empire (now in Poland)
Satmar	Aaron Teitelbaum (b. 1947); Zalman Leib Teitelbaum (b. 1952)	Joel Teitelbaum (1887–1979)	Kiryas Joel, New York; Williamsburg, Brooklyn	Szatmárnémeti, Austro-Hungarian Empire (now Satu Mare, Romania)
Skver	David Twersky (b. 1940)	Yitzchak Twersky	New Square, New York	Skvira, Russian Empire (now in Ukraine)
Vizhnitz	Yisroel Hager; Menachem Mendel Hager; Yisroel Hager; Menachem Mendel Hager; Yitzchak Yohanan Hager; Eliezer Ze'ev Hager; David Hager; Aharon Hager; Baruch Shimshon Hager	Menachem Mendel Hager	Bnei Brak, Israel; Kaser, New York; Kiamesha Lake, New York; Williamsburg, Brooklyn; Jerusalem; London; Montreal; Beit Shemesh	Vyzhnytsia, Bukovina, Austrian Empire (now in Ukraine)

== Dynasties with smaller following ==
Hasidic dynasties (arranged alphabetically) with a small following include:

Name	Current (or last) Rebbe	Founder	Presently headquartered In	Town of origin
Aleksander	Yisroel Tzvi Yair Danziger Yosef Yitzchak Meir Singer	Yechiel Dancyger (1828–1894)	Bnei Brak, Israel Borough Park, Brooklyn	Aleksandrów Łódzki, Poland
Amshinov	Menachem Kalish; Osher Chaim Kalish; Yaakov Aryeh Milikowsky	Yaakov Dovid Kalish of Amshinov (1814–1878)	Borough Park, Brooklyn; Beit Shemesh, Israel; Jerusalem, Israel	Mszczonów, Poland
Ashlag	Avraham Mordechai Gottlieb; Simcha Avraham Ashlag; Moshe Hayyim Brandwein	Yehuda Leib Ha-Levi Ashlag (1885–1954)	Bnei Brak, Israel	Warsaw, Poland
Biala	Avraham Yerachmiel Rabinowicz; Yaakov Menachem Rabinowicz; Aaron Rabinowicz	Yitzchok Yaakov Rabinowicz (died 1905)	Jerusalem, Israel; Bnei Brak, Israel; Borough Park, Brooklyn	Biała Podlaska, Poland
Boston	Moshe Shimon Horowitz; Mayer Alter Horowitz; Naftali Yehuda Horowitz;Chaim Avrohom Horowitz	Pinchas David Horowitz (1876–1941)	Brookline, Massachusetts; Jerusalem, Israel	Boston
Boyan	Nachum Dov Brayer	Yitzchok Friedman (1850–1917)	Jerusalem, Israel	Boiany, Bukovina (now in Ukraine)
Chernobyl	Menachem Nachum Twerski Avraham Yehoshua Heshel Twersky Yeshaya Twerski	Menachem Nachum Twerski of Chernobyl (1730–1797)	Bnei Brak, Israel; Ashdod, Israel; Borough Park, Brooklyn; Lawrence, NY	Chernobyl, Ukraine
Dushinsky	Yosef Tzvi Dushinsky	Yosef Tzvi Dushinsky (1867–1948)	Jerusalem, Israel	Jerusalem, Israel
Machnovka	Yehoshua Rokeach	Yosef Meir Twersky of Machnovka	Bnei Brak, Israel	Machnovka, Ukraine
Melitz	Naftali Asher Yeshayahu Moscowitz	Yaakov Horowitz of Melitz (son of Naftali Zvi of Ropshitz)	Ashdod, Israel	Mielec, Galicia (now in Poland)
Modzitz	Chaim Shaul Taub	Yechezkel Taub of Kuzmir (1755–1856)	Bnei Brak, Israel	Dęblin, Poland
Munkacz	Moshe Leib Rabinovich	Shlomo Spira ("Shem Shlomo") of Munkacz	Borough Park, Brooklyn	Munkács, Hungary (now in Ukraine)
Nadvorna	several	Mordechai Leifer (1835–1894)	Bnei Brak, Israel London	Nadvirna, Galicia (now in Ukraine)
Nikolsburg-Monsey	Yosef Yechiel Mechel Lebovits	Shmuel Shmelke HaLevi Horowitz of Nikolsburg (1726–1778)	Monsey, New York	Nikolsburg, Moravia
Novominsk	Yoshua Perlow (Borough Park, Brooklyn); Yisroel Perlow (Lakewood)	Yaakov Perlow I (1843–1902)	Borough Park, Brooklyn	Mińsk Mazowiecki, Poland
Pinsk-Karlin	Aryeh Rosenfeld	Aharon the Great of Karlin (1736–1772)	Jerusalem, Israel	Karlin, Belarus
Pupa	Yaakov Yechezkia Greenwald II (b. 1948)	Moshe Greenwald	Williamsburg, Brooklyn	Pápa, Hungary
Rachmastrivka	Yitzchak Twerski; David Twerski	Yochanan Twerski of Rachmastrivka	Borough Park, Brooklyn; Jerusalem, Israel	Rachmastrivka, Ukraine
Radzin or Izhbitza – Radzin	Shlomo Yosef Englard	Mordechai Yosef Leiner of Izhbitza	Bnei Brak, Israel	Izbica, Poland; Radzyń Podlaski, Poland
Rebar	Several		Jerusalem, Israel	Jerusalem Israel
Sadigura	Yisrael Moshe Friedman Ztl August 2020 Mordechai Shulem Yosef Friedman Yitzchak yehoushoua Heschel Friedman	Avrohom Yaakov Friedman of Sadigura (1820–1883)	Bnei Brak, Israel	Sadagóra, Bukovina (now in Ukraine)
Slonim	Shmuel Brozovosky; Avrohom Weinberg	Avraham of Slonim	Jerusalem, Israel; Bnei Brak, Israel	Slonim, Belarus
Shomer Emunim; Toldos Aharon; Toldos Avrohom Yitzchok	Avrohom Chaim Roth; Dovid Kohn; Shmuel Yaakov Kohn	Aharon Roth ("Reb Ahrele") (1894–1947)	Kiryat Shomrei Emunim, Jerusalem; Mea Shearim, Jerusalem	Jerusalem, Israel
Skolye	Refoel Goldstein Avrohom Moshe Rabinowitz		Borough Park, Brooklyn	Skole, Galicia, Ukraine
Skulen	Yeshaya Yakov Portugal; Efraim Yehuda Portugal; Meir Portugal; Zvi Noach Portugal; Shmiel Mordche Portugal	Eliezer Zusia Portugal (1898–1982)	Borough Park, Brooklyn; Williamsburg; Monsey; Lakewood; Jerusalem	Sculeni, Bessarabia, Russian Empire, later Romania (now in Moldova)
Spinka	Yisrael Chaim Weiss; Meir Eleazer Weiss; Avraham Yitchak Kahana; Abraham Abish Horowitz; Yitzchak Isaac Horowitz; Nuta Horowitz	Joseph Meir Weiss (1838–1909)	Williamsburg, Brooklyn; Jerusalem, Israel; Bnei Brak, Israel	Szaplonca, Hungary (now Săpânţa, Romania)
Tosh	Elimelech Segal-Lowy	Meshulam Feish Segal-Lowy I	Kiryas Tosh; Boisbriand, Quebec	Nyírtass, Hungary
Vien	Asher Anshel Katz	Klonumos Richter	Williamsburg, Brooklyn, New York	Vienna, Austria
Zvhil	Avraham Goldman; Shlomo Goldman; Yitzhak Aharon Korff (of Zvhil – Mezhbizh)	Moshe of Zvhil (died 1831)	Jerusalem, Israel; Union City, New Jersey; Boston, Massachusetts	Zvyahel, Volhynia (now Zviahel, Ukraine)

== Hasidic groups (non-dynastic) ==
Name	Founder	Headquartered in	Place of origin
Breslov	Nachman of Breslov (1772–1810)	Jerusalem, Israel	Bratslav, Ukraine
Malachim	Chaim Avraham Dov Ber Levine haCohen (1860–1938)	Williamsburg, Brooklyn	Brooklyn, New York
Peshischa	Yaakov Yitzchak Rabinowicz "The Yid Hakudosh" (1766–1813)		Przysucha, Poland
Rybnitza	Chaim Zanvl Abramowitz (d. 1995)		Rîbnița, Moldova / Transnistria

== Other dynasties ==
Many of these dynasties have presently few or no devotees, due to most of the Hasidic groups being destroyed during the Holocaust, 1939–1945. Other communities are flourishing, and have growing Hasidic sects. There are many dynasties whose followers number around five to fifteen people, and are not listed here.

=== A ===
- Alesk (from Olesko, Ukraine)
- Amdur (from Indura, Belarus)
- Anipoli (from Annopol, Ukraine)
- Apta / Zinkov / Mezhbizh (from Opatów, Poland)
- Akerman (from Bilhorod-Dnistrovskyi, Ukraine)

=== B ===
- Beitsh (from Biecz, Poland)
- Bender (from Bender, Moldova)
- Berditchev (Levi Yitzchok of Berditchev (1740–1810) from Berdychiv, Ukraine)
- Bergsass Current Rebbe: Aaron Pollak, Founder: Abraham Alter Pollak (died 2007), Headquartered in: El'ad, Israel (from Beregszász, Hungary (now Ukraine))
- Bertch (from Bircza, Poland)
- Białystok (from Białystok)
- Bialobrzeg (from Białobrzegi, Poland)
- Bluzhev (from Błażowa, Poland)
- Bikovsk (from Bikofsk)
- Bohush (from Buhuși, Romania)
- Bonia
- Botoshan (from Botoşani, Romania)
- Brod (from Brody, Ukraine) (several)
- Brezahn (from Berezhany, Ukraine)
- Brizdovitz (from Berezdivtsi, Ukraine)
- Bucharest (from București, Romania) (several)
- Burshtin (from Burshtyn, Ukraine)
- Bergener (Hasidic community) From Teaneck New Jersey

=== C ===
- Chabad-Avrutsh (from Ovruch, Ukraine)
- Chabad-Bobroisk (from Bobrujsk, Belarus)
- Chabad-Kapust
- Chabad-Liadi
- Chabad-Nezhin
- Chabad-Strashelye
- Chernovitz (from Chernivtsi) (several)
- Campevas, (from São Paulo, Brazil)
- Czortkow (from Chortkiv)
- Chust (from Khust) (several)
- Cleveland
- Cracow (from Kraków)

=== D ===
- Deish (hasidic dynasty) (from Dés, Hungary) (today Romania)
- Deyzh (from Dés, Hungary) (today Romania)
- Dinov (from Dynów, Poland)
- Dombrova (from Dąbrowa Tarnowska, Poland)
- Drubitsh (from Drohobych, Poland) (several)
- Dzirka (from Györke, Hungary) (today Ďurkov, Slovakia)
- Dzikov (from Tarnobrzeg, Poland)

=== E ===
- Erlau (from Eger/Erlau, Hungary)
- Etched (from Nagyecsed, Hungary)

=== F ===
- Faltishan (from Fălticeni, Romania)

=== G ===
- Galovitch (from Tulchyn, Ukraine)
- Gorlitz (from Gorlice, Poland)
- Gostynin (from Gostynin, Poland)
- Gvodzitz (from Hvizdets)
- Gribov (from Grybów, Poland)

=== H ===
- Hornsteipel (from Hornostaypil', Ukraine)
- Huvniv (from Uhniv, Ukraine)
- Husiatyn ( from Husiatyn, Ukraine)

=== K ===
- Kaliv (from Nagykálló, Hungary)
- Kaminke (the unrelated Ukrainian Kaminke dynasty from Kamianka, Ukraine and Galician Kaminke dynasty from Kamianka-Buzka, Ukraine)
- Kaminetz
- Kunskvola (from Końskowola, Poland)
- Karlin-Stolin (Hasidic dynasty)
- Kashau (from Kassa, Hungary)
- Kerestir (from Bodrogkeresztúr, Hungary)
- Khentshin (from Chęciny, Poland)
- Kretshnif (from Crăciunești, Romania)
- Kielce (from Kielce, Poland)
- Koidanov (from Koidanava, Belarus)
- Kolbasov (from Kolbuszowa, Poland)
- Komarno (from Komarno, Ukraine)
- Kopyczynitz (from Kopychyntsi, Ukraine)
- Korets (from Korets, Ukraine)
- Koson (from Mezőkaszony, Hungary)
- Kosov (from Kosiv, Ukraine)
- Kotsk (from Kock, Poland)
- Kozlov
- Kozhnitz (from Kozienice, Poland)
- Krasna
- Krula (from Nagykároly, Hungary)
- Kshanov (from Chrzanów, Poland)
- Kuzmir (from Kazimierz Dolny, near Warsaw) (several)

=== L ===
- Łańcut (from Łańcut, Poland)
- Lashkovitz (from Ulashkivtsi, Ukraine)
- Lelov (from Lelów, Poland)
- Lechovitch (from Lyakhavichy, Belarus)
- Linitz (from Illintsi, Ukraine)
- Liske (from Olaszliszka, Hungary)
- Lizhensk (from Leżajsk, Poland)
- Leva (from Leova, Moldova)
- Liozna (from Liozna, Belarus)
- Lublin (from Lublin, Poland) (several)
- Lutsk (from Lutsk, Ukraine) (several)

=== M ===
- Margareten (from Margitta, Hungary) (today Marghita, Romania)
- Mattersdorf (from Mattersburg, Austria)
- Mezhbizh (from Medzhybizh), Ukraine; Also see Apter Rov
- Mishkoltz (from Miskolc, Hungary) (several)
- Mogelnitz (from Mogielnica, Poland)
- Manestrishtze (from Monastyryshche, Ukraine)

=== N ===
- Narol (from Narol, Galicia/Austria-Hungary, now in Poland)
- Neshchiz (from Nesukhoyizhi (now Toikut, Ukraine))

=== O ===
- Ostrof
- Ozherov (from Ożarów, Poland)

=== P ===
- Pabianice (from Pabianice, Poland)
- Pashkan (from Paşcani, Romania)
- Piasetzne (from Piaseczno, Poland)
- Pietrokov (from Piotrków Trybunalski, Poland)
- Pilts (from Pilica, Poland)
- Pilzno (named for Pilzno, Poland)
- Pintchiv (from Pińczów, Poland)
- Pittsburgh (from Pittsburgh, Pennsylvania)
- Porisov (from Parysów, Poland)
- Premishlan (from Peremyshliany, Ukraine)
- Pshemishl (from Przemyśl, Poland)
- Pshevorsk (from Przeworsk, Poland)

=== R ===
- Radomsk (from Radomsko, Poland)
- Radoshitz (from Radoszyce, Poland)
- Radowitz (from Rădăuţi, Romania)
- Radvil (from Radyvyliv, Ukraine)
- Radzymin (from Radzymin, Poland)
- Ratzfert (from Újfehértó, Hungary)
- Ribatitch (from Rybotycze, Poland)
- Rimenov (from Rymanów, Poland)
- Roman (from Roman, Romania)
- Ropshitz (from Ropczyce, Poland)
- Ruzhin (from Ruzhyn, Ukraine)
- Rzeszów (Rzeszów, Galicia, Poland)

=== S ===
- Sambur (from Sambir, Ukraine) (several)
- Shinov
- Sasregen (from Szászrégen, Hungary) (today Reghin, Romania)
- Sassov (from Sasiv, Ukraine)
- Savran (from Savran, Ukraine)
- Seret (from Siret, Romania)
- Shedlitz (from Siedlce, Poland)
- Shotz (from Suceava, Romania)
- Shidlovtza (from Szydłowiec, Poland)
- Shineva (from Sieniawa, Poland)
- Shpikov (from Shpykiv, Ukraine)
- Shtefanesht (from Ştefăneşti, Romania)
- Siget (from Máramarossziget, Hungary) (today Sighetu-Marmaţiei, Romania) (parent of, now sharing leadership with, the Satmar dynasty above)
- Sochatchov (from Sochaczew, Poland)
- Sokolov (from Sokołów Podlaski, Poland – there was a branch of the Ropshitz dynasty in Sokołów Małopolski, Poland, as well)
- Stanislov (from Stanyslaviv, Ukraine) (several)
- Stepan (from Stepan, Ukraine)
- Stitshin (from Szczucin, Poland)
- Stretin (from Stratin, Ukraine)
- Strikov (from Stryków, Poland)
- Strizhov (from Strzyżów, Poland)
- Stropkov (from Sztropkó, Hungary (now in Stropkov, Slovakia))
- Sudilkov (from Sudylkiv, Ukraine)
- Sulitza (from Sulița, Romania) (there was also a branch of the Shotz dynasty in Sulitza)

=== T ===
- Tetsh (from Técső, Hungary (now Tyachiv), Ukraine)
- Temeshvar (from Temesvár, Hungary) (today Timișoara, Romania)
- Tolna (from Talne, Ukraine)
- Toldos Tzvi (a branch of the Spinka)
- Trisk (from Turiisk, Ukraine)
- Thullnner (from Mosonmagyaróvár, Hungary – headquarters destroyed and successors scattered around the world after June 1944)
- Tseshenov (from Cieszanów, Poland)
- Tshakova (from Szczakowa, Poland)
- Teplick (Hasidic dynasty)

=== U ===
- Ujhel (from Újhely, Hungary)
- Ungvar (from Ungvár, Hungary)
- Ushpitzin (from Oświęcim, Poland)

=== V ===
- Vasloi (from Vaslui, Romania)
- Vien (from Wien/Vienna)
- Volova (from Mizhhirya, Ukraine)
- Vorka from Warka, Poland
- Vulkan (from Zsilyvajdejvulkán, Hungary (today Vulcan, Hunedoara, Romania)
- Vialopola (hasidic dynasty)
- Verdan (hasidic dynasty)

=== Y ===
- Yeruslav (from Jarosław, Poland) (several)

=== Z ===
- Zablitov (from Zabolotiv, Ukraine)
- Zbarz (from Zbarazh, Ukraine) (several)
- Zenta (break-off from Satmar) (from Zenta, Hungary) (today Senta, Serbia)
- Zhmigrod (from Nowy Żmigród, Poland)
- Zhitomir (from Zhytomyr, Ukraine)
- Zidichov (from Zhydachiv, Ukraine)
- Zinkov
- Zlatipol (from Zlatopol)
- Zlotchov (from Zolochiv)
- Zolozitz (from Zaliztsi)
- Zychlin
