= Shulem Moskovitz =

Romanian rabbi (1877–1958)

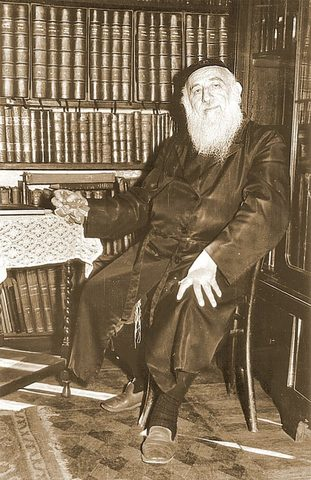
- Title: Shotzer Rebbe

Personal life
- Born: Shulem Moskowitz; 23 November 1877 Suceava, Romania
- Died: 14 January 1958 (aged 80) London, England
- Buried: Adath Yisroel Cemetery, Enfield
- Spouse: Shlomtza Moskowitz
- Parent: Mordechai Yosef Moshe Moskowitz (father)
- Dynasty: Shotz

Religious life
- Religion: Judaism

Jewish leader
- Successor: Yechiel Mechel Moskowitz
- Began: 1877
- Ended: 1958
- Main work: Daas Sholom
- Dynasty: Shotz

Shulem Moskovitz (23 November 1877 – 14 January 1958), known as the Shotzer Rebbe, was a Romanian hasidic rabbi. He was a descendant of the famed hasidic Rebbe Yechiel Michel of Zlotshov.

== Background ==
Moskovitz emigrated to London, England, before World War II, settling in Stamford Hill, a part of London where not many hasidic Jews lived then. In London, he became known as the Shotzer Rebbe. He established a Beis Medrash affiliated to the Union of Orthodox Hebrew Congregations.

Rabbi Shulem was the son of Rabbi Mordechai Yosef Moshe of Sulitza. He married Shlomtza, his first cousin, the daughter of his father's brother, Rabbi Meir, and his first wife, Dinah. The Shotzer Rebbe wrote several volumes of Torah commentaries named Daas Sholom, are arranged according to the order of Perek Shira. He was a genius both in the revealed Torah and in Kabbala, and lived a lifestyle of holiness and simplicity.

Among the Shotzer Rebbe's descendants are The Successor Rabbi Yechiel Mechel Moskowitz, the shotz-drubitz'r rabbi (Brooklyn / Bet Shemesh), and Rabbi David Moskowitz, the Shotzer Rebbe of Ashdod, Israel, and Rabbi Naftali Asher Yeshayahu Moskowitz, the Melitzer Rebbe, also in Ashdod, author of several books, including Peiros Hailan on the laws of Chol HaMoed, and Nefesh Chaya, a commentary and interpretation of the Book of Psalms.

Moskovitz died in London on 14 January 1958, at the age of 80. He is buried in the Adath Yisroel cemetery in Enfield. An ohel was built over his grave. His gravesite is known as a source of yeshuos and people from all over the world travel to his kever to seek salvations. It is a place of pilgrimage every Friday.

Moskovitz left an ethical will specifying that anyone could come to his grave and ask for his help, as long as they undertake to better themselves in at least one way in exchange.

== See also ==
- Shotz (Hasidic dynasty)
- Zlotshov (Hasidic dynasty)
