= Skolya (Hasidic dynasty) =

Ukrainian Hasidic dynasty

Skolya is a Hasidic dynasty named after the town of Skole (Yiddish: Skolye) in Eastern Galicia in Ukraine), where the founder of this dynasty lived and led his court.

== List of rabbis ==
- Rabbi Yitzchok of Drohobych (d. March 11, 1752), disciple of the Baal Shem Tov.
  - Rabbi Yekhiel Michel Rabinowitz of Zlotshev (c.1721 – 1786), known as the Zlotshiver Maggid.
    - Rabbi Yosef Rabinowitz of Yampol (d. January 9, 1812), son of Rabbi Yekhiel Mikhl of Zlotshev
      - Rebbe Yitzchok Rabinowitz of Yampil (son-in-law of Reb Boruch of Mezhbizh), son of Rabbi Yosef of Yampol; succeeded his father-in-law as Rebbe in Mezhbizh).
        - Rebbe Boruch Rabinovich of Yampil, son of Reb Yitschak Drubitsher.
          - Rebbe Eliezer Chaim Rabinowitz of Yampola (1845–1916) (the first Hasidic rebbe in America and founder of the Skolya dynasty) – son of Rebbe Boruch Rabinovich of Iași.
            - Rebbe Boruch Pinchas Rabinowitz of Skolya (Skole) (1874–1920), buried in Vienna, son of Rebbe Eliezer Chaim of Yampola
              - Rebbe Aaron Moshe Leifer of Chust, son-in-law of Boruch Pinchas Rabinowitz of Skolya
                - Rebbe Shmuel Shmelke Leifer of Chust (son of Rabbi Aaron Moshe), Rosh Yeshiva of Toras Chessed
              - Rebbe Dovid Yitzchok Eizek Rabinowitz of Skolya (1896–1979), buried in Jerusalem on the Mount of Olives – son of the Rebbe Boruch Pinchas of Skolya.
                - R. Eliezer Chaim Rabinowitz, eldest son of Rebbe Dovid Yitzchok Eizek of Skolya
                - R. Meir Rabinovich (September 1, 1918- August 14, 2006), second son of Rebbe Dovid Yitzchok Eizek of Skolya
                  - Rebbe Refael Goldstein, Skolya Rebbe on 18th Ave in BP, the son-in-law Meir Rabinovich and grandchild through marriage of Rebbe Dovid Yitzchok.
                - R. Yosef Boruch Pinchus Rabinowitz, son of Rebbe Dovid Yitzchok Eizek of Skolya
                  - Rebbe Avraham Moshe Rabinowitz, current Skolya Rebbe and author of about 20 spiritual books, placed by the old Skolya rebba to take over after him, son of R. Boruch Rabinowitz and eldest grandson of Rebbe Dovid Yitzchok
            - Rebbe Shmuel Avrohom of Mezhbizh (1883– ) – son of Rebbe Eliezer Chaim of Yampola. Rebbe Shmuel Avrohom was known as the Mezhbizher Gutter Yid.
