= Sasregen (Hasidic dynasty) =

Romanian Hasidic dynasty

Sasregen is a Hasidic dynasty from Reghin, Romania. Rabbi Mordechai Dovid Rubin was the previous Sasregener Rebbe in the Midwood section of Brooklyn, New York. He died in 2020.

== History ==
Sasregen is one of many offshoots of the Ropshitz Hasidic dynasty that were re-established in New York City after World War II by surviving descendants of Grand Rabbi Naftali Tzvi Horowitz, the first Ropshitzer Rebbe; others include Beitsh, Dolina, Dombrov, Dzhikov, Melitz, Shotz, Strizhov, Stutchin, Sulitza, and Tseshenov.

The previous Sasregener Rebbe was the son of Rabbi Jacob Israel Jeshurun Rubin (30 Kislev 5645 [December 18, 1884], Zhydachiv, – 15 Sivan 5704 [June 6, 1944]), av beis din (head of the rabbinical court) of Solitza and Sasregin, Romania, who was murdered in the Auschwitz concentration camp, and Alte Nechama Malka Dachner, daughter of Rabbi Chaim Dachner of Seret, who was also killed in the Holocaust. His two brothers were also rabbis.

Rubin married Mirl Eichenstein, daughter of Rabbi Joshua Eichenstein. Their eldest son, Rabbi Yehoshua Rubin, is the Bobover Rav of 45th Street, and son-in-law of Grand Rabbi Naftali Halberstam of Bobov. The Sasregener Rebbe was the author of Kol HaMikra'ot ShebeTalmud Bavli, which he began in 1955 and published in 1987.

== Dynasty ==
- Grand Rabbi Naftali Tzvi Horowitz of Ropshitz (1760–1827), author of Zera Kodesh.
  - Grand Rabbi Asher Yeshaya Rubin of Ropshitz (d. 1845), son-in-law of Rebbe Naftali Tzvi, known as Reb Osher'l, son-in-law of Rabbi Naftali Tzvi. Author of אור ישע [Or yeshaʻ].
    - Grand Rabbi Menachem Mendel Rubin of Glogov (Głogów Małopolski) (c. 1806 – 1873), son of Rebbe Asher Yeshaya.
      - Grand Rabbi Meir Rubin of Glogov (1829–1897), son of Rebbe Menachem Mendel.
        - Grand Rabbi Baruch Rubin of Brezdovitz (Berezdivtsi, Lviv Oblast, Ukraine) and Gherla (1864–1935), son of Rebbe Meir. Author of שארית ברוך She'erit Barukh (Jerusalem, 1973).
          - Grand Rabbi Yaakov Yisrael veYeshurun Rubin of Sulitza (Sulița) and Sasregen (Reghin) (1884–1944), son of Rebbe Baruch. Rabbi of Sulitza, and Rebbe in Sasregen. He was murdered in the Holocaust.
            - Grand Rabbi Mordechai Dovid Rubin (Died 8 Nissan 5780 which is on April 2, and he was approximately 90 years old), Sasregener Rebbe, son of Rebbe Yaakov Yisrael veYeshurun, and son-in-law of Rebbe Yehoshua Eichenstein of Grosswardein of the Zidichov dynasty. Rabbi of K'hal Sasregen congregation in the Midwood neighborhood of Brooklyn, New York.
