= Meshullam Feivush Heller =

Rabbi from Austria-Hungary (1742–1794)

Rabbi Meshullam Feivush Heller

Personal life
- Born: c. 1742
- Died: 12 December 1794 (aged 51–52) Zbarazh, Galicia
- Buried: Zbarazh

Religious life
- Religion: Judaism

Jewish leader
- Yahrtzeit: 20 Kislev, 5555 A.M.

Reb Meshullam Feivush Heller of Zbarazh (c. 1742– 12 December 1794) was the author of several Hasidic sefarim including the Yosher Divrei Emes.

== Biography ==
Rabbi Meshullam Feivush was born to a rabbinic family. His father Harav Aharon Moshe of Sniatin was a fifth-generation direct descendant of Rabbi Yom-Tov Lipmann Heller (author of the Tosefes Yom Tov). His mother was a descendant of Rabbi Judah ben Samuel of Regensburg. Rabbi Meshullam Feivush was also a descendant of Rabbis Samson ben Pesah Ostropoli and Solomon Luria.

Rabbi Meshullam Feivush spent most of his life in Zbarazh. He did not serve in any official position. He was primarily a disciple of the Maggid of Zlotshov although he also basked in the presence of the Maggid of Mezritch and Rabbi Menachem Mendel of Premishlan, all of whom he quotes in his sefer.

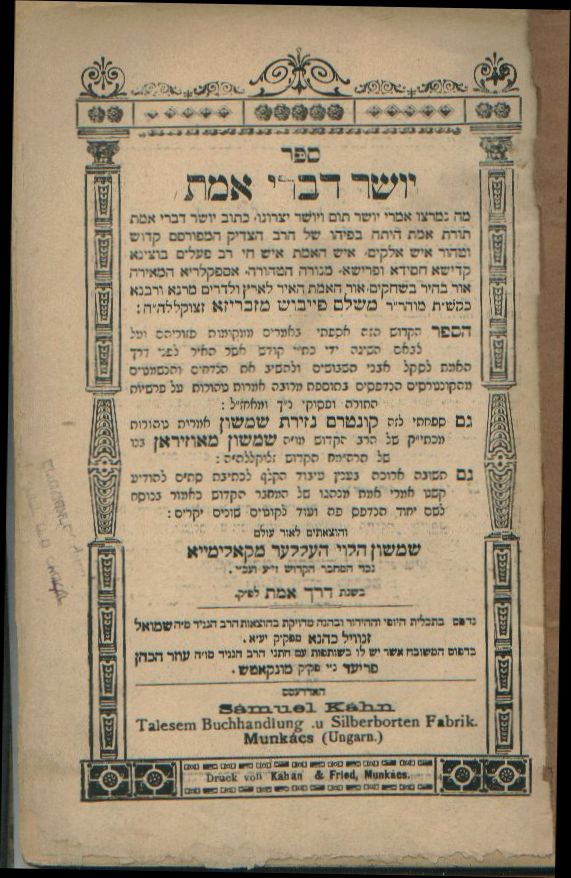
Sefer Yosher Divrei Emes

His older brother, a non-Hasidic Kabbalist and the Av Beit Din of Dolyna (d. 1786), also authored a sefer with his endorsement which appears in its beginning.

Rabbi Meshullam Feivush was married twice. He had one son by his first wife and two sons by his second wife. His sons were Harav Moshe Aharon, Harav Baruch Yitzchak, and Harav Shimshon of Ozhiran. He was a close friend of Rabbi Hayyim Tyrer who cites him in his works. He died at Zbarazh on 12 December 1794 and was buried at Zbarazh.

== Works ==
Rav Meshulam Feivish is best known for his classic Chassidic work, Yosher Divrei Emes. It consists of two pamphlets, the first written in 5537/1777 and the second, Kuntres Derech Emes, written after 5541/1781. (We know this because the Zlotchover Maggid was niftar (Hebrew, means deceased) on 25 Elul 5541/1781, and the pamphlet mentions that he was already deceased.) Some of his drashos were also published in the sefer Likutim Yekarim.

A Rebbe and Chassidic leader, Rav Meshulam Feivish was also renowned for his knowledge of Shas and Poskim. Unfortunately, not many of his halachic rulings have survived. Rav Meshulam Feivish had a unique mehudar sefer Torah that is quoted by the sefer Mishnas Avraham on hilchos Stam as a source and proof for certain halachos in tzuras ha’osiyos, the forms and shapes of the letters.

Rav Meshulam Feivish had many pupils. Some of the more famous include Harav Dovid Shlomo Eibshitz, the Arvei Nachal; Harav Yosef Dovid Hakohen, Rav in Zhvaliv and Yassi and mechaber of Derech Emunah; Harav Menachem Mendel of Kossov-Vizhnitz; and Harav Chaim of Tchernowitz, the Be’er Mayim Chaim, who is considered a talmid chaver, zechusam yagein aleinu.

After Rav Meshulam Feivish’s death, most of his followers flocked to the court of his close disciple, Harav Menachem Mendel of Kossov, founder of the Vizhnitz dynasty.
