= Zlotshev =

Zlotshev (Yiddish: זלאָטשעוו) can refer to:

- Zolochiv, Lviv Oblast, Ukraine
- Złoczew, Poland
- Zlotshov (Hasidic dynasty), a Hasidic dynasty founded in Zolochiv
