= Vien (Rabbinical dynasty) =

Austrian Hasidic dynasty

Vien (וויען) is a Rabbinical dynasty originating in present-day Vienna. The previous rav of Vien was Rav Chaim Z. Hersh Zegelbaum of Brooklyn, New York. He was a descendant of Rav Menachem Mendel Stern (1759–1834) of Sighet, author of Derech Emunah.

== Lineage ==
- Rabbi Yoseph Yisroel Zegelbaum (born 1915 in Hungary; died June 4, 1989, in Brooklyn); Rabbi Yoseph Yisroel was married to Rebbetzin Mindel; daughter of Rabbi Yoseph Menachem Friedman of Makova (a brother of Rabbi Yisroel Chaim Friedman (1852–1922) author of Likutei Mariach). She died in Vienna in March 1945.
  - Rabbi Chaim Zvi Hersh Zegelbaum of Brooklyn (died July 6, 2017, 11 Tammuz 5777 A.M., in Brooklyn, at the age of 77); (eldest son of Rabbi Yoseph Yisroel); married to Rebbetzin Sarah, daughter of Rabbi Kalman Yehuda of Bnei Brak.
    - Rabbi Nussen Zegelbaum (eldest son of Rabbi Chaim Z. Hersh); married to Rebbetzin Shprintza Mirl, daughter of Rabbi Peretz, Av Beit Din of Sulitza.
      - Rebbetzin Chana; daughter of Rabbi Nussen Zegelbaum.
      - Rebbetzin Rivka Meisels; daughter of Rabbi Nussen Zegelbaum and wife of Rabbi Shlomo Yechezkel Meisels, grandson of Rabbi Nusen Yosef Meisels.
      - Rabbi Yoseph Yisroel Zegelbaum.
    - Rabbi Yakov Duvid Zegelbaum of Brooklyn. son of Rabbi Chaim Z. Hersh and son-in-law of the Spinka Rebbe.
    - Rebbetzin Mindl Sheva; daughter of Rabbi Chaim Zvi Hersh Zegelbaum.
    - Rabbi Menachem Ben-Zion Zegelbaum; son of Rabbi Chaim Zvi Hersh Zegelbaum.
    - Rebbetzin Sheindel Malkah; daughter of Rabbi Chaim Zvi Hersh Zegelbaum.
    - Rabbi Meir Zegelbaum; son of Rabbi Chaim Zvi Hersh Zegelbaum.
  - Rabbi Shmiel Teitelbaum of Brooklyn; son of Rabbi Aharon Teitelbaum and son-in-law of Rabbi Yoseph Yisroel Zegelbaum.
    - Rabbi Yakov Duvid Ben-Zion Teitelbaum of Brooklyn; son of Rabbi Shmiel and son-in-law of Rabbi Yosef Chaim Moskowitz of Brooklyn, grandson of Rabbi Shulem Moshkovitz of Shotz.
    - Rabbi Aryeh Leibish Teitelbaum of Brooklyn; son of Rabbi Shmiel and son-in-law of Rabbi Yitzchok Luzer Moskowitz of Monsey, New York, grandson of Rabbi Shulem Moshkovitz of Shotz.
  - Rabbi Moshe Pollak of Brooklyn; son of the Rabbi of Landsberg and son-in-law of Rabbi Yoseph Yisroel Zegelbaum.
  - Rabbi Chananya Yom Tov Lipa Zegelbaum of Brooklyn; son of Rabbi Yoseph Yisroel and son-in-law of Rabbi Raphael Silber, author of Marpe Lanefesh.
    - Rabbi Yaakov Dovid Zegelbaum; son of Rabbi Chananya Yom Tov Lipa.
  - Rabbi Yaakov Dovid Ben-Zion Zegelbaum; son of Rabbi Yoseph Yisroel.
