= Yitzhak Aharon Korff =

American rabbi

Yitzhak Korff
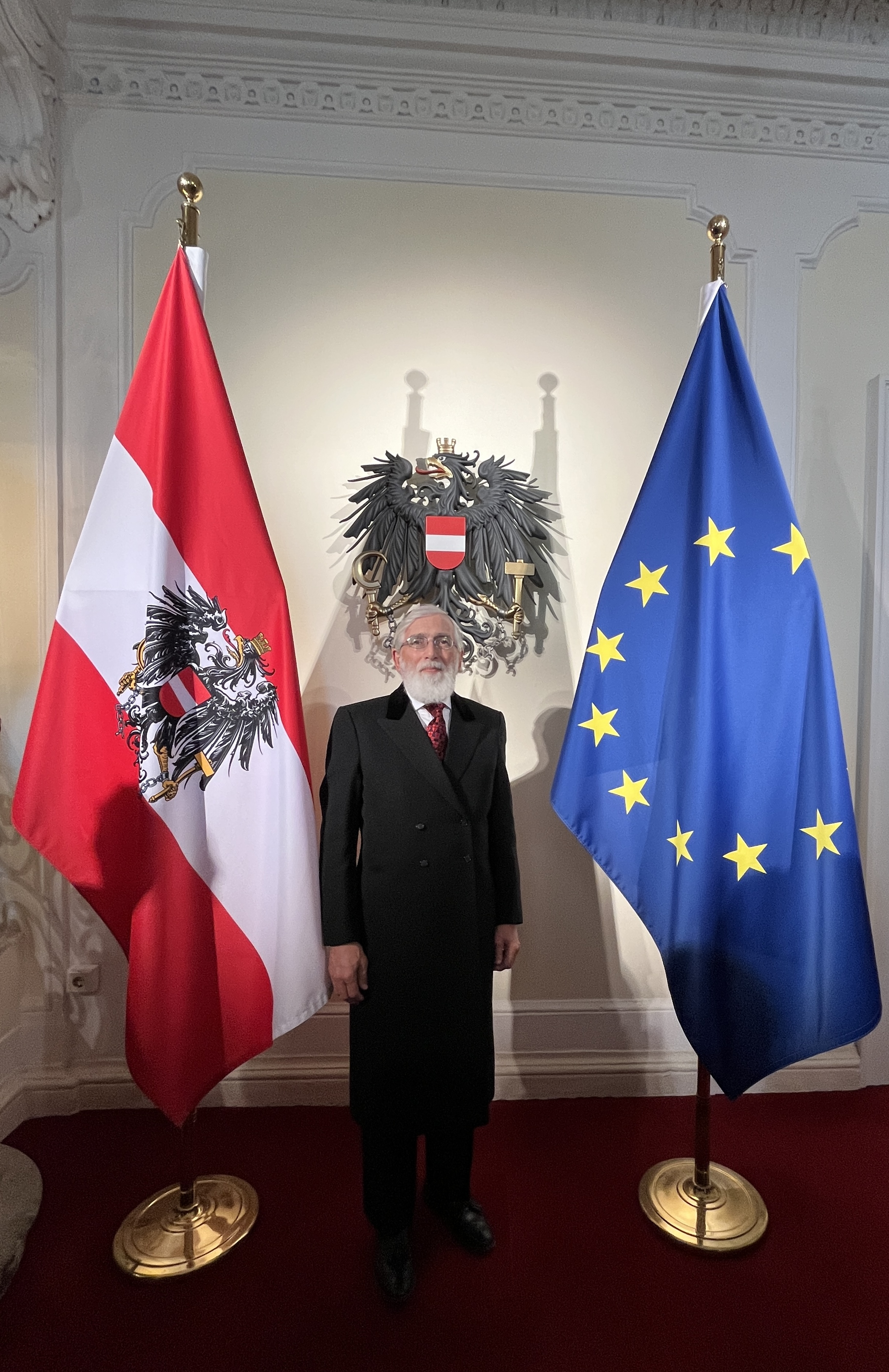
- Austrian Presidential Place in 2024
- Other name: Y. A. Korff
- Education: Hebrew College (BJE); Columbia University (BA); Yeshiva Rabbi Chaim Berlin (Semikhah); Brooklyn Law School (JD); The Fletcher School of Law and Diplomacy (Tufts-Harvard) (MA, MALD, PhD); Harvard University Divinity School (Res. Grad.); Boston University (LLM)
- Notable work: Meshivas Nefesh Yitzchok: Insights of a Contemporary Chassidic Master
- Spouses: Shari Redstone (m. 1980; div. 1992); Devorah Roth (m. 1998)
- Children: 6

Yitzhak Aharon "Ira A." Korff is the present Rebbe of Zvhil – Mezhbizh. Since 1975 he has been the Chaplain of the City of Boston (serving the Boston Police and Fire Departments, Mayor's Office, City Council and other City departments and agencies) and spiritual leader of Congregation Bnai Jacob, Zvhil–Mezhbizh Beit Medrash of Boston, Miami, and Jerusalem, serving also with the Chief Rabbis of Israel as Spiritual Leader of The Jerusalem Great Synagogue. He is a dayan (judge of Jewish law) of the BaDaTz Boston Beth din (rabbinical court) and Vaad HaRabbonim (council of rabbis). He is also principal of Korff Associates, consultants in business, diplomacy and international law and relations, and he served as the publisher of the Boston-based Jewish newspaper The Jewish Advocate until it suspended publication in 2020. He also served as Consul of the Republic of Austria for more than 37 years and was conferred Austria's highest honour, the Goldene Ehrenzeichen (Decoration of Honour in Gold), by the President of Austria.

== Family ==
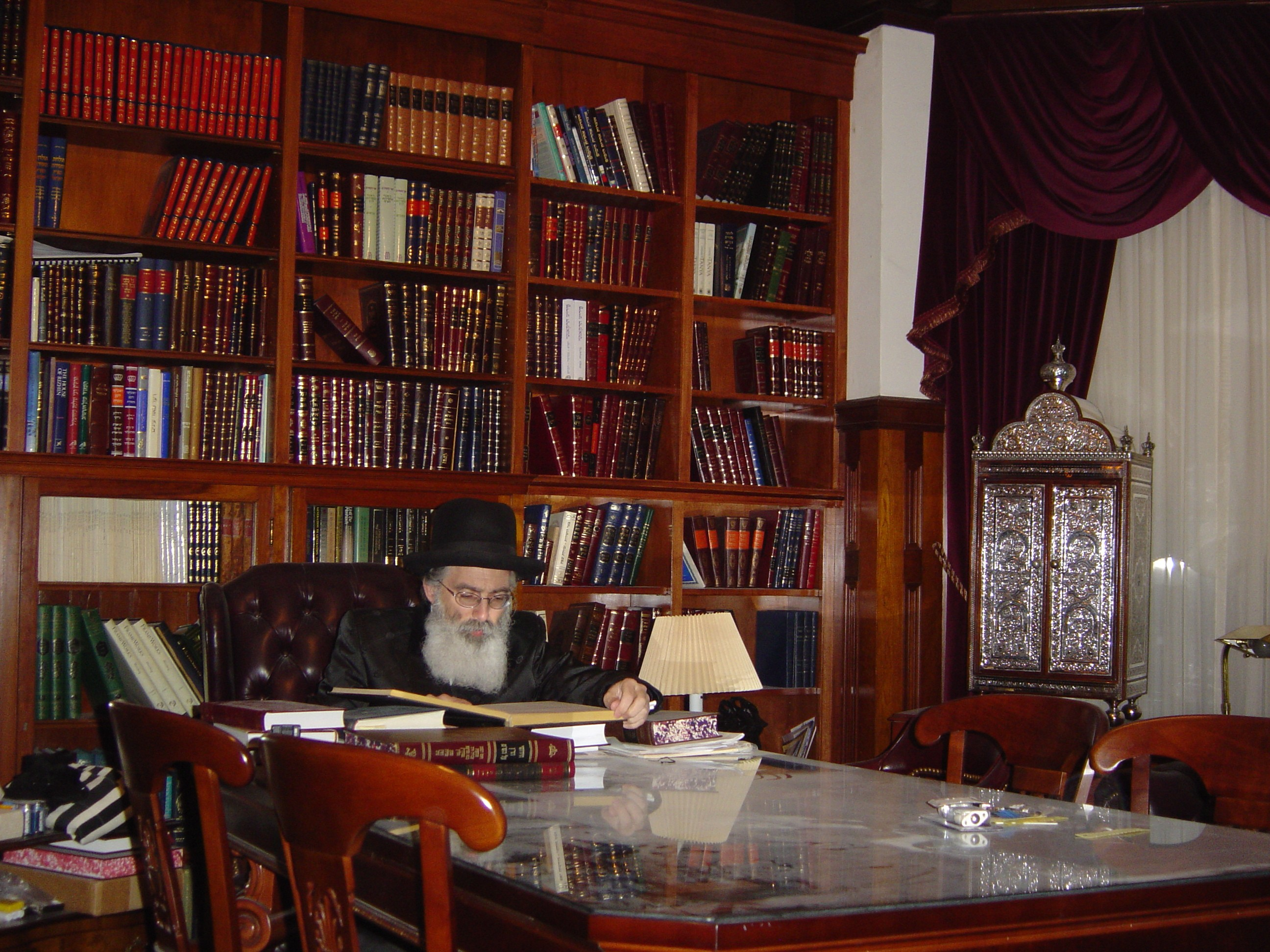
The Rebbe in his study

Korff's father was Nathan (Nochum or Menachem Nochum) Korff, who served as founding rabbi of Congregation B'nai Jacob in Milton, Massachusetts. His uncle Baruch Korff was well known as a spiritual advisor to Richard Nixon.

Korff is a direct descendant of the Baal Shem Tov, the 18th century founder of the Hasidic movement, through both the Baal Shem Tov's grandson Rabbi Boruch of Medzhybizh, founder of the Mezhbizh Hasidic dynasty, as well as patrilineally through the Baal Shem Tov's son. Korff is also descended from numerous other Hasidic dynasties, including Zlotshev, Chernobyl, Apt, Yampol and Karlin, as well as Zvhil.

He is also a descendant of the Chabad Lubavitch chasidic dynasty through the Dovber Schneuri’s (the Mittler Rebbe's) daughter and son-in-law Rabbi Yaakov Yisroel of Cherkass, son of Mordechai Twerski of Chernobyl.

His first wife, Shari Redstone whom he married in 1980 and later divorced, is the daughter of Sumner Redstone, Chairman of the Board and controlling shareholder of the Viacom and CBS Corporation media conglomerates.

His second wife is a native of Jerusalem and a descendant of the Baal Shem Tov and the Hasidic dynasties of Zvhil, Zlotshev, and Tshernobl. She is the daughter of the late Shomer Emunim Rebbe, Avrohom Chayim Roth of Jerusalem and Bnei Brak. Her mother, Korff's third cousin, was the daughter of the previous Zvhiller Rebbe of Jerusalem, R' Mordechai.

He has six children.

== Education ==
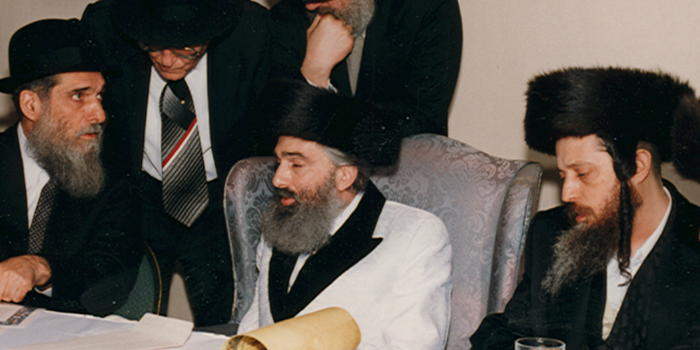
Korff (center) in his study with cousins including Rabbi Yitzhak Twersky (left) and Grand Rabbi Shlomo Goldman

He received three ordinations (Smicha, D.D.), educated at Yeshiva Rabbi Chaim Berlin, the Rabbinical Seminary of Israel, and Yeshivas Beis Mordechai (Zvhil) of Jerusalem, and was tutored privately by masters of Hasidism and Kabbalah.

Korff is a graduate of Hebrew College for a Bachelor of Jewish Education; Columbia University for a Bachelor of Arts; Brooklyn Law School for a Juris Doctor; the Fletcher School of Law and Diplomacy at Tufts University and Harvard University for a Master of Arts in international relations, a Master of Arts in international law and diplomacy, and a Doctor of Philosophy in international law; and Boston University School of Law for a Master of Laws. He was also a resident graduate student at Harvard Divinity School.

He is admitted to the Bar in Massachusetts and Washington, DC, and to the US Supreme Court, US Court of International Trade, and US Tax Court.

== Career ==
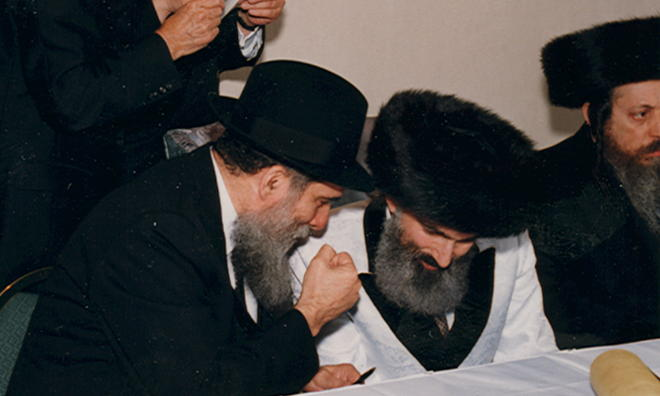
Together with the Tolna Rebbe of Boston

Korff simultaneously combined careers as a rabbi, chaplain, lawyer, diplomat, businessman and entrepreneur. His grandfather Jacob I. Korff was a Hasidic Rebbe, and he eventually assumed the position of successor to his grandfather.

In the late 1970s and early 1980s, Korff served as rabbi of several Orthodox congregations in Boston and Providence, at Temple Beth Sholom in Providence which he converted from Conservative to Orthodox (becoming Cong. Beth Sholom), and at Temple Aliyah, a Conservative synagogue in Needham.

He organized and staffed the first White Collar Crime Unit and the first Juvenile Diversion Unit in the United States as a special consultant to the Norfolk County (Mass.) District Attorney's Office, and he served as a Special Assistant Attorney General for Massachusetts. On a political level he has advised candidates for political office at the City Council, Mayoral, Mass. Senate, Governor's Office, and U.S. Senate and Congressional level, and assisted officials in substantive matters following their election to office.

After marrying Shari Redstone, Korff also went into the family's entertainment business, which he expanded internationally. He served as president of National Amusements, the Redstone family business through which they exercise various degrees of control in Viacom and CBS, from 1987 until 1994, two years after the divorce, served as Executive Vice President and on the Board of Directors of Viacom, and remained a consultant to Mr. Redstone and his company for an additional fifteen years until 2009.

He has served as an advisor and consultant in both public and private international relations, assisting numerous governments (including the United States, the U.K., Austria, Thailand, China, Jordan and others) in matters of diplomacy and international relations, and he has advised numerous national and multi-national business ventures in the United States and abroad.

== Works ==
Korff is the author of Meshivas Nefesh Yitzchok: Insights of a Contemporary Chassidic Master, in the original Hebrew/Yiddish/Aramaic and in English translation, on Kabbalah and Halakha, Jewish laws. It has been sold 100s of times and is available in both English and Hebrew on Amazon

== See also ==
- Mezhbizh (Hasidic dynasty)
- Zhvil (Hasidic dynasty)

== Sources ==
- Toldos Anshei Shem, Rand and Greenblat, New York, 1950
- Sefer Meshivas Nefesh Yitzhak, New York, 2000, 2001, second Revised Edition ISBN 0-9645367-1-4
- HaHasidut, Prof. Yizhak Alfasi, Jerusalem.
