= Machnovka (Hasidic dynasty) =

Ukrainian Hasidic dynasty

Machnovka Hasidic Dynasty
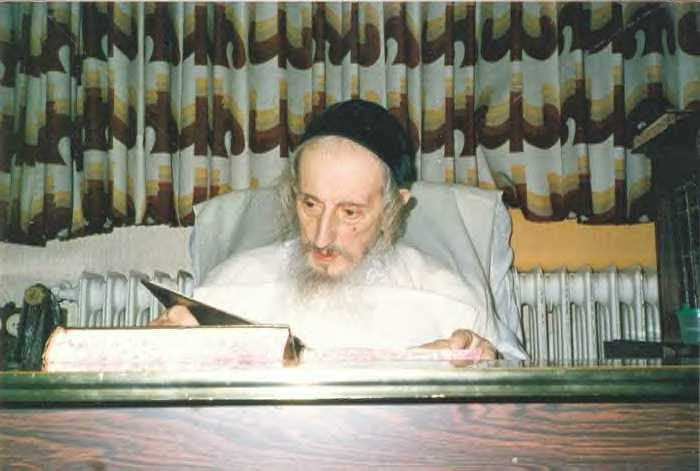
- Grand Rabbi Abraham Joshua Heshel Twersky of Machnovka

Total population
- Over 5,000 families (2022)

Founder
- Yoseph Meir Twersky

Regions with significant populations
- Israel, Ukraine, United States, Europe

Religions
- Judaism

Languages
- Hebrew, Yiddish
- Current headquarters in Bnei Brak, Israel

Machnovka (various spellings) is an extant Hasidic dynasty that is part of the Chernobyl dynastic group. It is also a sub-dynasty of Skver.

It takes its name from the village Makhnivka in Ukraine, where its founder lived.

Having survived the Holocaust, it preserves elements of the cultures of early-twentieth-century Ukrainian and Polish Jews.

Its Hasidic court is now located in Bnei Brak, Israel.

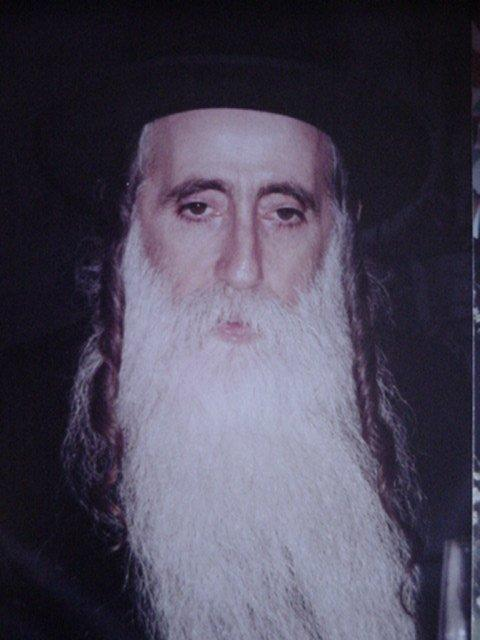
Grand Rabbi Joshua Rokeach, present Machnovke Rebbe

== Lineage ==
The founder the Chernobyl dynasty was Rebbe Menachem Nachum Twersky of Chernobyl, a disciple of Rabbi Yisroel ben Eliezer, the Baal Shem Tov, who established the Hasidic movement

- Grand Rabbi Menachem Nochum Twersky of Chernobyl - author of Meor Einayim, disciple of the Baal Shem Tov
  - Grand Rabbi Mordechai Twersky the "Maggid of Chernobyl", son of the Meor Einayim – had eight sons who each became a rebbe and started his own dynasty.
    - Grand Rabbi Yitschok Twersky of Skver, son of the Maggid of Chernobyl
      - Grand Rabbi Avraham Yehoshua Heshel Twersky (1826-1886) of Skver, son of Rabbi Yitschok
        - Grand Rabbi Yoseph Meir Twersky (1860- 29 Av 1917) of Machnovka, son of Rabbi Abraham Yehoshua Heshel of Skver
          - Grand Rabbi Menachem Nochum Twersky (1880-1945) of Skver-Machnovka, son-in-law of Rabbi Yoseph Meir of Machnovka
          - Grand Rabbi Avraham Yehoshua Heshel Twersky (24 Adar 1895 - 10 Tishrei 1987) of Machnovka-Bnei Brak, son of Rabbi Yoseph Meir of Machnovka
              - Grand Rabbi Yehoshua Rokeach (born 1949), current Machnovka-Rebbe of Bnei Brak, great-nephew of Rabbi Avraham Yehoshua Heshel of Machnovka

Rabbi Avrohom Yehoshua Heshel served as Machnifker Rebbe for 70 years, from 1917 to 1987. For many years in the USSR he defied the communist authorities by spreading the teachings of Judaism and Hasidism. After World War II he was invited by the Soviet authorities to serve as Chief Rabbi of the Soviet Union. His refusal to accept this position led to him being banished to Siberia. In 1965 he received permission to leave the Soviet Union and he emigrated to Bnei Brak, Israel.

== Bibliography ==
- Rabinowicz, Tzvi M. (ed.). The Encyclopedia of Hasidism. Northvale, NJ: Jason Aronson Inc., 1996.
- Grand Rabbis of Chernobyl (in Hebrew and English; Hebrew title: Admorei Malchus Beis Chernobyl), Flushing and Lakewood, New York: Genealogy Research Center of the Twersky Chernobyl Dynasty and the Makarov-Chernobyl Foundation, 2003.
- Rosenstein, Neil. The Unbroken Chain: Biographical Sketches and Genealogy of Illustrious Jewish Families from the 15th-20th Century, rev. ed. (2 vols.). New York, NY: CIS Publishers, 1990.

== See also ==
- History of the Jews in Poland
- History of the Jews in Galicia (Central Europe)
- History of the Jews in Ukraine
