= Mordechai of Kremnitz =

Hasidic rabbi (~1745–1820)

Personal life
- Born: 1745/1746
- Died: 23 June 1820 (age 74 or 75)
- Parents: Yechiel Michel of Zlotshov (father); Sarah Rakhil (mother)

Religious life
- Religion: Judaism
- Denomination: Hasidic
- Synagogue: Synagogue at Kremenets

Rabbi Mordechai of Kremnitz (Hebrew: מרדכי מקרמניץ) (1745/1746 – 23 June 1820) was a Hasidic rabbi in the city of Kremenets. He is considered by some to be one of the greatest rebbes of his generation.

== Biography ==
Mordechai was the son of Rabbi Yechiel Michal of Zloczow and his wife Sarah Rakhil bat Moshe, the youngest of five brothers. Yechiel was a disciple of the Baal Shem Tov and the Maggid of Mezeritch. He married the daughter of Rabbi Eliezer of Kolbasov. He was a pupil of both his father and of Rabbi Elimelech of Lizhensk.

Following his father's death, Mordechai assumed his father's position as Rebbe. Many Hasidim across Volhynia travelled to visit him. He composed a Siddur according to Ha'ARI called Tefilah Yeshorah, known as the Siddur Berditschov.

Among his students were:

- Rabbi Avraham Dov of Avrutsch
- Rabbi Yeshayahu Shor of Horodanka
- Rabbi Meir of Premishlan
- Rabbi Nathan of Breslov, who began to approach Hasidism under the guise of Mordechai

== Family ==
Among his children are:

- Rabbi Yitzhak of Granov, the son-in-law of Rabbi Sholom Shachne or Prohobisht
- A daughter who married Rabbi Shlomo of Granov, son of Rabbi Shmuel Yehuda Rabinowitz
- Another daughter, who married Rabbi Zvi-Aryeh of Safed
- Rabbi Michal of Vishnowitz
- Rabbi Yosef Yoska of Valtsisk
- Rabbi Israel, son-in-law of Chaim Hagar of Kosov
- A daughter, who married Rabbi Yehuda Meir of Dinov
- Rabbi Binyamin
- Chava, who married Rabbi Aharon of Karlin the Younger
- Another daughter, who married Rabbi Yosef David Landau of Olyka
