= Berdichev uezd =

Subdivision of the Kiev Governorate of the Russian Empire

Berdichevsky Uyezd Бердичевский уезд
- Uezd
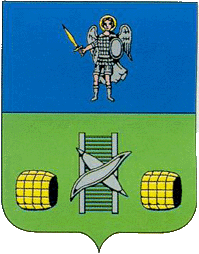
- Coat of arms

- Location in the Kiev Governorate
- Country: Russian Empire
- Krai: Southwestern
- Governorate: Kiev
- Established: 1802
- Abolished: 1923
- Capital: Berdichev

Area
  - Total: 3,411.11 km^{2} (1,317.04 sq mi)

Population (1897)
  - Total: 279,695
  - Density: 81.9953/km^{2} (212.367/sq mi)

Berdichevsky Uyezd (Russian: Бердичевский уезд; (Note: Pre-reform spelling: Бердичевскій уѣздъ) Ukrainian: Бердичівський повіт, romanized: Berdychivskyi povit), known originally as Makhnovka Uyezd, was one of the subdivisions of the Kiev Governorate of the Russian Empire. Its administrative centre was Berdichev (Berdychiv).

== History ==
The uezd was established in 1802.

On an 1845 Russian map, the uezd is shown as being named Makhnovka uyezd, with its administrative center in Makhnivka. After further developments in the railroad that changed its path to favor Berdychiv, the importance of Makhnivka declined. The uezd center was moved to Berdychiv, and the uezd was renamed to Berdichev uezd.

It was abolished in 1923.

== Demographics ==
At the time of the Russian Empire Census of 1897, Berdichevsky Uyezd had a population of 279,695. Of these, 66.9% spoke Ukrainian, 23.1% Yiddish, 5.8% Polish, 3.6% Russian, 0.3% Czech and 0.2% German as their native language.
