= Shotz (Hasidic dynasty) =

Romanian Hasidic dynasty

Shotz is a Hasidic dynasty originating in the city of Suceava, Romania (Yiddish: שאָץ Shots, IPA: [ʃɔts]).

== Origins and early history ==
=== Lineage of the Shotz dynasty ===
- Rabbi Yisroel "Baal Shem Tov", founder of Hasidism
  - Rabbi Yechiel Michl, the "Magid of Zlotshev", a student of Rabbi Yisroel.
    - Rabbi Yosef of Yampol (son of Rabbi Yechiel Mechl)
      - Rabbi Chaim of Satanov (son of Rabbi Yosef of Yampol), married Sheindel, said by some to have been the daughter of Rabbi Mordechai of Neshchiz, but denied by some of Rabbi Yoel's descendants.
        - Rabbi Yoel Moscowicz (Yiddish: ר' יואל מאָשקאָוויטש) the first rebbe of Shotz (son of Rabbi Chaim of Satanov)
        He married Miriam Chaya, the daughter of Rabbi Meyer'l of Premishlan.

=== Outline of the Shotz dynasty ===
- Rabbi Yoel of Shotz
  - Rabbi Alter Aharon Aryeh of Podilay (Yiddish: פאדיליי; Podu Iloaiei, Romania)
  - Rabbi Mordechai Yosef Moshe of Sulitza (Yiddish: סוליצא; Sulița, Romania)
    - Rabbi Shulem Moshkovitz of Shotz – son of Rabbi Mordechai Yosef Moshe and son-in-law of his uncle, Rabbi Meir
  - Rabbi Meir of Shotz, Rabbi Yoel's successor.
    He married Dinah Rubin, daughter of Rabbi Yitzchak Rubin of Brody, a descendant of the Ropshitz dynasty, and Eidel, daughter of Rabbi Sholom Rokeach of Belz. After Dinah died, Rabbi Meir married Vita. He had children from both marriages.

Rabbi Moshe Aryeh Leib Moshkovitz Shotzer Rebbe of Tshernovitz son of Rebbe Meir, who married Pesha Leah, the daughter of Rebbe Nacum of Bershtein. They had 4 children, Avraham Chaim, who was killed by the Nazi's, Eidel who was married to Rav Moshe Paneth, Rav of Deizh, Reb Yoel who was killed by the Nazis and Reb Tzvi Moshkovitz, married to Friedeh the daughter of Reb Yisroel Seidenfeld from Munkatch, Reb Tzvi Moshkovitz, who lived in New York had 2 children, Yisroel Moshkovitz who lives In Boro Park, Brooklyn and Reb Moshe Aryeh (Leibel) Moshkovitz who is Rebbe of the International Center of Shotz in Jerusalem. Abraham Chaim’s wife and 2 children survived the Holocaust, his son Reb Mayer is the Shotzer Rebbe on the East side of Manhattan he has 4 children from his marriage to Chaya Sarah Rabinowitz, daughter of Reb Yosef Benzion the Detroiter Rebbe. His children are Milka Rachel of Brooklyn, Avraham Chaim of Long Island, Meshulam Zushe of Ofra, Israel and Yoel of Manhattan.

    - Rabbi Yaakov (Yankel) Moshkovitz of Shotz.
      Son of Rabbi Meir and one of his successors. He was the Rebbe of Shotz for a period of time before and after World War II before immigrating to Haifa, Israel. He married Pessl, the daughter of Rabbi Sinai Halberstam, the Rebbe of Zhmigrod. They had two children, Yekusiel Yehuda (Zalmen Leib) and Miriam Yehudis. Rabbi Yaakov died in 1954 but his son refused to become a rebbe.
      - Rabbi Sinai Moshkovitz of Shotz-Beitar.
        Son of Rabbi Yekusiel Yehuda and Rebbetzin Chana, daughter of the rebbe of Kretchnif-Bucharest, Rabbi Shmuel Deutcsh. He was 9 years old when his father died in 1976 and became rebbe in 2016 in accordance with his mother's will. He resides in Beitar Illit.

== Rabbi Shulem Moscowicz ==
Rabbi Shulem Moshkovitz, the Shotzer Rebbe, was the son of Rabbi Mordechai Yosef Moshe above. He married Shlomtza, the daughter of his father's brother, Rabbi Meir, and his first wife, Dinah. He later moved to London, England. Rabbi Shalom left a will specifying that anyone who can come to his grave and ask for his help, as long as they better themselves in at least one way in exchange.

The Shotzer Rebbe wrote several volumes of Torah commentaries named Daas Sholom, which are arranged according to the order of Perek Shirah. He was known as a genius both in the revealed Torah and in Kabbalah, and lived a life style of holiness and simplicity.

The most prominent descendant of Shotzer Rebbe is rabbi y. M. Moskowitz the shotz-drubitz'r rabbi, (Brooklyn/ bet shemesh), Also is very appreciated, his grandson Rabbi Naftali Asher Yeshayahu Moscowitz, the Melitzer Rebbe, in Ashdod, author of several books, including Peros Hailan on the laws of Chol HaMoed, and Nefesh Chaya, a commentary and interpretation of the Book of Psalms.

There are also Shotzer Rebbes in Montreal, Jerusalem, Bnei Brak, Beth Shemesh, Monsey, Brooklyn, and Antwerp.

== See also ==
- List of Hasidic dynasties
