= Yehoshua Rokeach of Machnovka =

Israeli rabbi (born 1949)

Yehoshua Rokeach יהושע רוקח
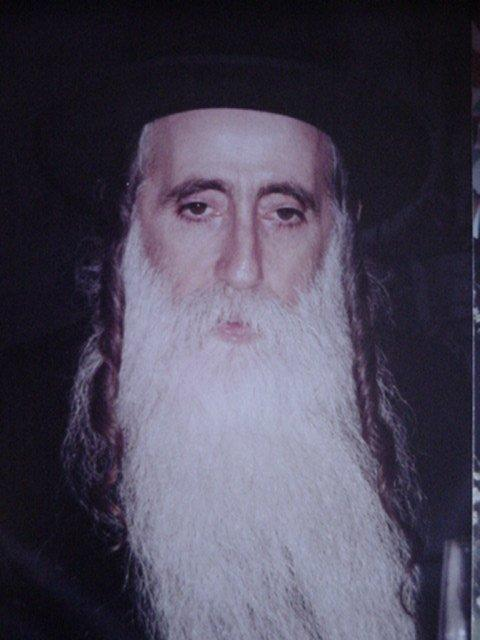
- Rokeach

Religious life
- Religion: Judaism

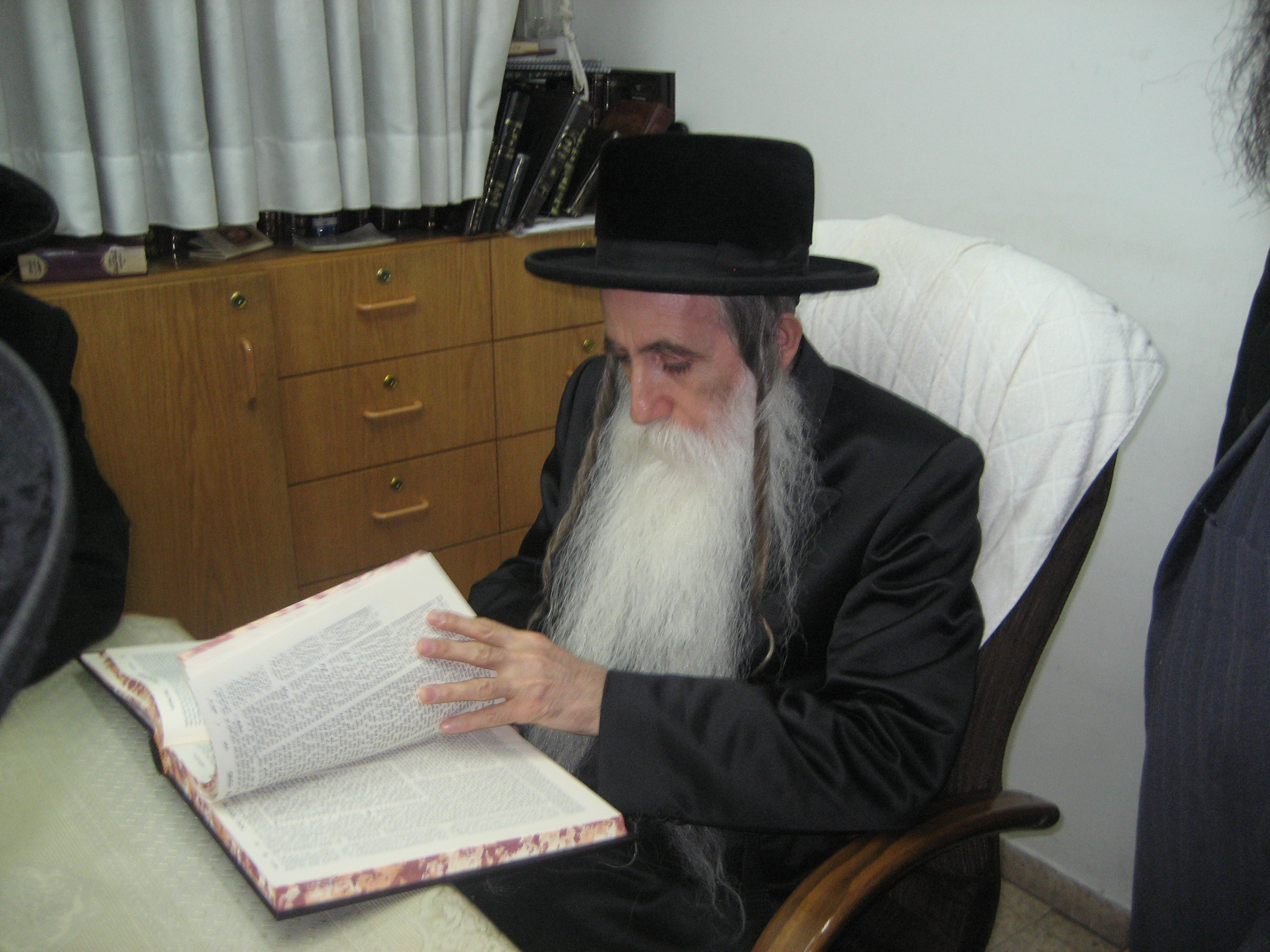

Yehoshua Rokeach (Hebrew: יהושע רוקח; born 1949) is the Machnovka Rebbe of Bnei Brak,

== Belz dynasty lineage ==
- .Shalom Rokeach, author of Sar Shalom, the first Belzer Rebbe, a disciple of the Seer of Lublin
  - Yehoshua Rokeach, son of the Sar Shalom, second Belzer Rebbe
    - Grand Rabbi Yissachar Dov Rokeach, son of Yehoshua, the third Belzer Rebbe. He first married Basia Rochma, daughter of Rabbi Yeshaya Meshullam Zusya Twersky. Then he married Chaya Devora of the Pychenik family of Berezna. The Belz connection with Chernobyl was strong. Issachar, though a Belzer rebbe, was known as the “illui (prodigy) of Chernobyl,” where he lived for ten years. Rabbi Issachar's five daughters all married into the Chernobyl dynasty.
      - Yehoshua Rokeach of Jaroslaw, son of Issachar Dov of Belz (with his second wife). Yehoshua married and then divorced Chana, daughter of the first Machnovker Rebbe, Yosef Meyer Twersky
        - Isaac David Rokeach, son of Yehoshua and Chana above.
          - Yehoshua Rokeach is the son of Rabbi Isaac David Rokeach, son of Chana Zosha above. He succeeded his great-uncle Rebbe Avraham Yehoshua Heshl Twersky as Machnovker Rebbe. He is the fourth Machnovker Rebbe.

== Bibliography ==
- Grand Rabbis of Chernobyl (in Hebrew and English; Hebrew title: Admorei Malchus Beis Chernobyl), Flushing and Lakewood, New York: Genealogy Research Center of the Twersky Chernobyl Dynasty and the Makarov-Chernobyl Foundation, 2003.
- Rabinowicz, Tzvi M. (ed.). The Encyclopedia of Hasidism. Northvale, NJ: Jason Aronson Inc., 1996.
- Rosenstein, Neil. The Unbroken Chain: Biographical Sketches and Genealogy of Illustrious Jewish Families from the 15th-20th Century, rev. ed. (2 vols.). New York, NY: CIS Publishers, 1990.
