= Makhnivka, Khmilnyk Raion, Vinnytsia Oblast =

Village in Vinnytsia Oblast, Ukraine

Makhnivka Махнівка
- Village
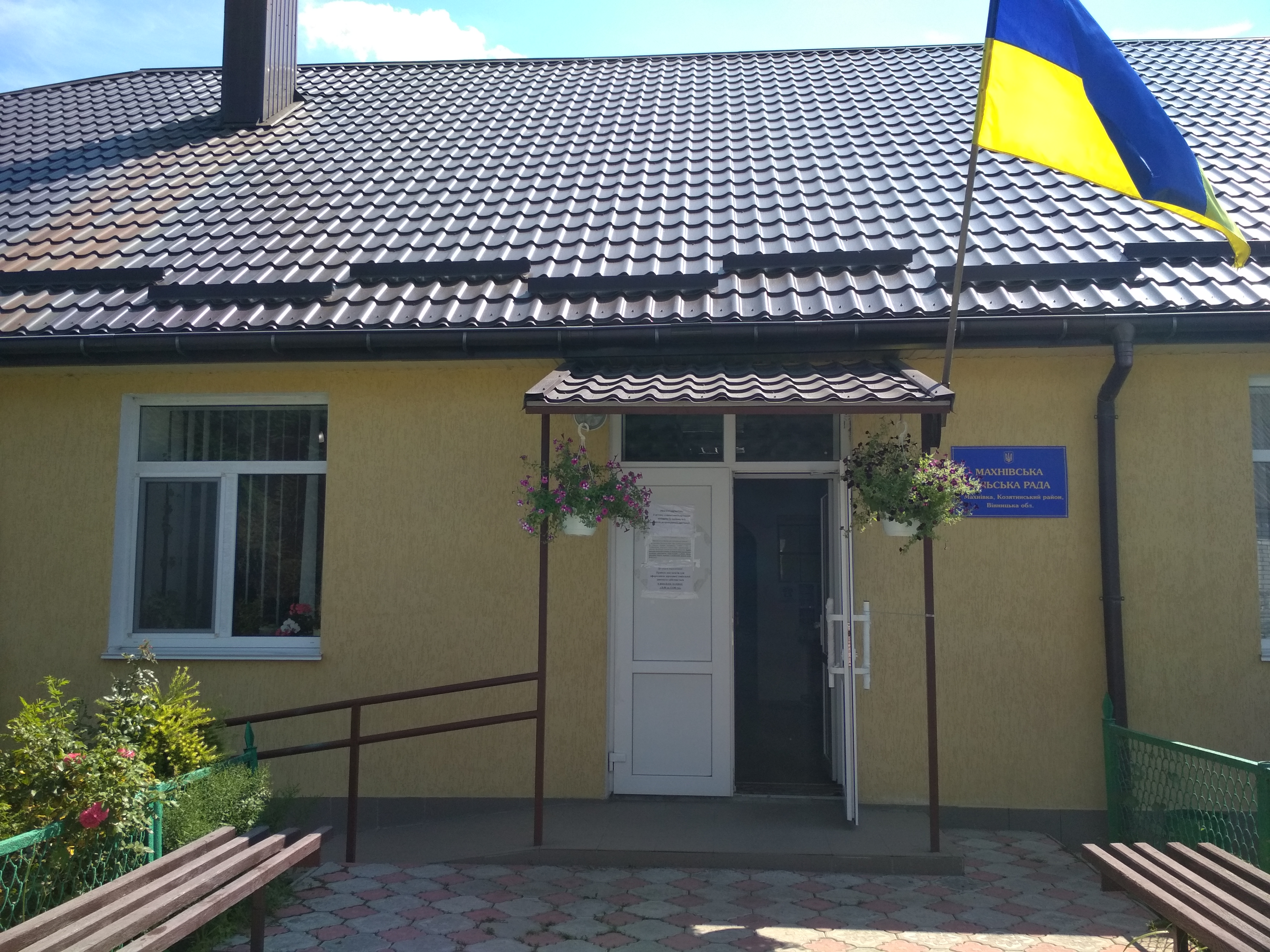
- Village council building

- Location within Ukraine Makhnivka (Ukraine)
- Coordinates: 49°43′13″N 28°40′17″E
- Country: Ukraine
- Oblast: Vinnytsia Oblast
- Raion: Khmilnyk Raion
- Hromada: Makhnivka rural hromada
- First mention: 1430

Area
  - Total: 5.15 km^{2} (1.99 sq mi)
- Elevation: 250 m (820 ft)

Population (2001)
  - Total: 3,467
  - Density: 673.2/km^{2} (1,744/sq mi)
- Zip Code: 22133

Makhnivka (Ukrainian: Махнівка; Russian: Махновка; Yiddish: מאכניווקא (Note: The Russian name is transliterated as Makhnovka. The Yiddish name can be variously transliterated as Machnovka, Machnowka, or Machnivka.)) is a village in Khmilnyk Raion of Vinnytsia Oblast, Ukraine, located on the west bank of the Hnylopiat River. It was named Komsomolske (Note: Ukrainian: Комсомольське; Russian: Комсомольское, romanized: Komsomolskoye) from 1935 until 2016. As of 2017, it had a population of 3,415 people.

The village is notable for its historical Jewish population, including the Machnovka Hasidic dynasty that has its origins in Makhnivka.

== Geography ==
Makhnivka is in western Ukraine, located 21 kilometres (13 mi) south-southeast of Berdychiv and 154 km (96 mi) southwest of Kyiv. The Hnylopiat river – a tributary of the Teteriv – flows through the village.

== History ==
=== Poland-Lithuania ===
The first mention of the village is in a letter in 1430, under its original name Makhnivka. At the time, it was located in the Grand Duchy of Lithuania. It was granted to the Tyszkiewicz family by the Grand Duke of Lithuania Svidrigailo. As a result of the 1569 Union of Lublin, it became part of the Polish-Lithuanian Commonwealth.

The first mention of the Jewish community in Makhnivka came in 1648, in an account from the Khmelnytsky Uprising (1648–57), when Bohdan Khmelnytsky's Cossacks attacked the local fortress and murdered a number of Poles and Jews.

In 1765, six Jews were recorded as living in Makhnivka.

=== Russian Empire ===
As a result of the 1793 Partition of Poland, a large territory including Makhnivka was incorporated into the Russian Empire. Orthodox Tsarist Russia, which was intolerant of Jews, suddenly acquired a significant Jewish population in the territories annexed from Catholic Poland. As a result, the Pale of Settlement was created, generally restricting Jews to living in the new territories, but not in "Russia proper". Jews during this period had a generally harder time, at best being isolated, and at worst being visited with violent pogroms.

Between 1796 and 1846 the town served as the administrative center of Makhnovka uyezd within Kiev Governorate. In 1846, Makhnivka received the status of a town. The Machnovka hasidic dynasty was established in the town in the second half of the 19th century.

When the railroads were developed (some time after 1860), the railroad went through Berdychiv and Koziatyn (11 km (7 mi) east of Makhnivka), but bypassed Makhnivka. This caused Makhnivka's importance to decline, while both Berdychiv and Koziatyn grew. Sometime around the turn of the 20th century, Berdychiv replaced Makhnivka as the chief city of the uyezd (which was renamed from Makhnovka uyezd to Berdichev uyezd). During the late 1880s until 1913, many Jewish families emigrated from Makhnivka because of "hard times and lack of opportunity", leading the Jewish population to sharply decrease. In the Russian Empire Census of 1897, the village of Makhnivka had 2,435 Jews out of a total population of 5,343 (about 45%).

=== Ukrainian War of Independence ===
On 19 August 1919 units of the Ukrainian Galician Army captured Makhnivka from Bolshevik forces.

=== Soviet Union ===
In 1923, after the collapse of the Russian Empire and Ukraine's inclusion in the Soviet Union, Makhnivka was designated a village, and subordinated to Berdychiv Okruha within the Ukrainian SSR. In the late 1920, a heder, a type of Jewish primary school, was set up in the village, and was attended by a few dozen children.

In 1932, Makhnivka became part of Vinnytsia Oblast. In 1935, Makhnivka was renamed Komsomolske, a common Soviet placename that refers to the Komsomol. By the outbreak of World War II in 1939, the Jewish population of the village had dwindled to 843. The Germans captured the village on 14 July 1941 and on 9 September murdered 835 Jews in the Zhezhelevsk forest 5 km (3 mi) from Komsomolske. Komsomolske was eventually liberated by the Red Army on 7 January 1944.

After the end of the war, the Rebbe of the Machnowka dynasty was exiled to Siberia by the Soviet government. In 1962, Komsomolske became part of Koziatyn Raion. In 1965, the Machnowka Rebbe was allowed to emigrate to Israel, where the dynasty continues to flourish.

=== Independent Ukraine ===
The village council voted to restore the historic name Makhnivka in 2001. In 2016, the change was made official, returning the name Makhnivka. On 18 July 2020, Koziatyn Raion was abolished, and its territory, including Makhnivka, was merged into Khmilnyk Raion on 18 July 2020 as part of the administrative reform of Ukraine, which reduced the number of raions of Vinnytsia Oblast to six.

== Demographics ==
Population history
Year	Pop.	±% p.a.
1897	5,343	—
2001	3,467	−0.41%
2017	3,415	−0.09%

As of 2017, 3,415 people lived in Makhnivka. It had a majority of ethnic Ukrainians, with a significant minority population of Romani people (5.83%).

== Notable people ==
- Volodymyr Antonovych (1834–1908), Ukrainian historian
- Tomasz Padura (1801–1871), Ukrainian-Polish songwriter
