= Zvhil (Hasidic dynasty) =

Ukrainian Hasidic dynasty

Zvhil is the name of a Hasidic dynasty, with adherents today in Jerusalem, Boston, and New York.

The dynasty originated with Rabbi Moshe of Zvhil, the son of Rabbi Yechiel Michl, the "Magid of Zlotshev". He was also the grandson of Rabbi Yitzchok of Drubitsh and Rabbi Aharon of Karlin. As in several inter-related Hasidic dynasties, family tradition held that Rabbi Moshe was a descendant of King David.

Rabbi Moshe died in 1831 and was succeeded by his son Rabbi Yechiel Michl Goldman of Zvhil. The last rebbe to reside in Zvhil was Grand Rabbi Yaakov Yisroel Korff. Rabbi Yaakov Yisroel was also the Tsar-appointed Chief Rabbi of Russia.

The town of Zvhil (Ukrainian: Zvyahel) is located in Volhynia, in present-day Ukraine. Today it is known as Zviahel. The Jewish version of the name, Zvhil, instead of Zvyahel can be attributed to the similarity between Zvhil and Zvul (one of the holy names for the ancient Jewish Temple in Hebrew, pronounced 'Zvil' by Ukrainian Jews).

== Lineage ==
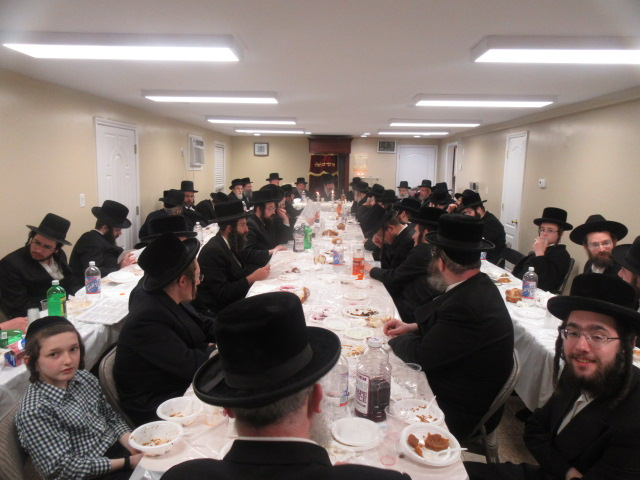
- Grand Zvhiller Rebbe of Monsey
  Rabbi Isaac of Drubitsh (d. 1752)
  - Rabbi Yechiel Michl, the Maggid of Zlotshev (1726-1781), son of Rabbi Isaac. A disciple of Rabbi Israel Baal Shem Tov, founder of Hasidism.
    - Rebbe Moshe of Zvhil (died 1831), son of the Maggid of Zlotshev.
      - Rebbe Yechiel Michl Goldman of Zvhil (1788-1856), son of Rebbe Moshe.
        - Rabbi Mordechai Goldman of Zvhil (d. 1900), son of Rabbi Yechiel Michel.
          - Rabbi Yechiel Michl (the Second) of Zvhil (d. 1917), elder son of Rabbi Mordechai.
            - Rabbi Yaakov Yisrael (Korff)of Zvhil-Mezhbizh in Boston, son of Rabbi Mordechai of Mezhbizh and son-in-law of Rabbi Yechiel Michel (the Second) of Zvhil.
              - Rabbi Dr. Yitzhak Aharon Korff (Ira A. Korff), Zvhil-Mezhbizh Rebbe of Boston, MA, grandson of Rabbi Yaakov Yisroel, son-in-law of the Shomer Emunim Rebbe, Grand Rabbi Avrohom Chayim Roth of Jerusalem and Bnei Brak (son of Reb Areleh). Chaplain of the City of Boston and Rabbi of The Jerusalem Great Synagogue.
          - Rabbi Shlomo "Shlomke" Goldman of Zvhil-Jerusalem (d. 1945), younger son of Rabbi Mordechai.
            - Rabbi Gedalia Moshe Goldman of Zvhil-Jerusalem (d. 1950), son of Rabbi Shlomo.
              - Rabbi Mordechai Goldman (II) of Zvhil (1910-1981), son of Rabbi Gedalia Moshe
                - Rabbi Avraham Goldman of Zvhil-Jerusalem (1933-2009), son of Rabbi Mordechai
                  - Rabbi Gedalia Moshe Goldman, present Zvhiller Rebbe of Jerusalem, son of Rabbi Avraham
                  - Rabbi Shlomoh Goldman, Zvhiller Rebbe of Jerusalem (d.2022), son of Rabbi Avraham
                  - Rabbi Moshe Nosson Notte Goldman, present Zvhiller Rebbe of Jerusalem, son of Rabbi Shlomo
                - Rabbi Shlomo Goldman, Zvhiller Rebbe of Union City, New Jersey (d. 2017), son of Rabbi Mordechai and son-in-law of Rabbi Yekusiel Yehudah Halberstam of Klausenberg
                - Rabbi Yosef Goldman, son of Rabbi Mordechai
                  - Rabbi Yaakov Leib Goldman, Zvhiller Rebbe of Monsey, NY, son of Rabbi Yosef, became Rebbe after the passing of his uncle, the Zvhiller Rebbe of Union City. Also the Magid Shiur of the prominent Chok L'Yisroel Chabura in Monsey, NY.
                  - Rabbi Eliezer Goldman, Zvhiller Rebbe of Monsey, NY, son of Rabbi Yaakov Leib and son-in-law of Rabbi David Twersky of New Square, New York, became Rebbe after the passing of his uncle, the Zvhiller Rebbe of Union City
              - Rabbi Elazar Adler, Zvhiller Rebbe of Los Angeles (1921 – February 27, 2007), son of Rabbi Yosef Yehoshua Aharon of Lelov, married the daughter of Rebbe Moshe of Blendov (of the Kozhnitz dynasty), whose wife was the daughter of R' Shlomke. Originally of Jerusalem, he emigrated to America in early June 1938 and settled in the West Adams section of Los Angeles, California; later relocating to West Hollywood.

Lineage The Zvhill-Monsey Dynasty

- Rabbi Isaac of Drubitsh (d. 1752)
  - Rabbi Yechiel Michl, the Maggid of Zlotshev (1726-1781), son of Rabbi Isaac. A disciple of Rabbi Israel Baal Shem Tov, founder of Hasidism.
    - Rebbe Moshe of Zvhill, son of Rabbi Yechiel Michl.
      - Rebbe Mechele of Zvhill, son of The Rebbe Moshe
        - Rebbe Mordechai of Zvhill, son of The Rebbe Mechele
          - Rebbe Shlomo “Shlomke” of Zvhill, Jerusalem, son of Rebbe Mordechai
            - Rebbe Gedalia Moshe of Zvhill, Jerusalem, son of Rebbe Shlomo.
              - Rebbe Mordechai of Zvhill, Jerusalem, son of Rebbe Gedalia Moshe
                - Rebbe Yosef of Zvhill, Jerusalem, son of Rebbe Mordechai of Zvhill
                  - Rebbe Yaakov Leib Goldman Shli”ta, Monsey, son of Rebbe Yosef of Zvhill, Jerusalem
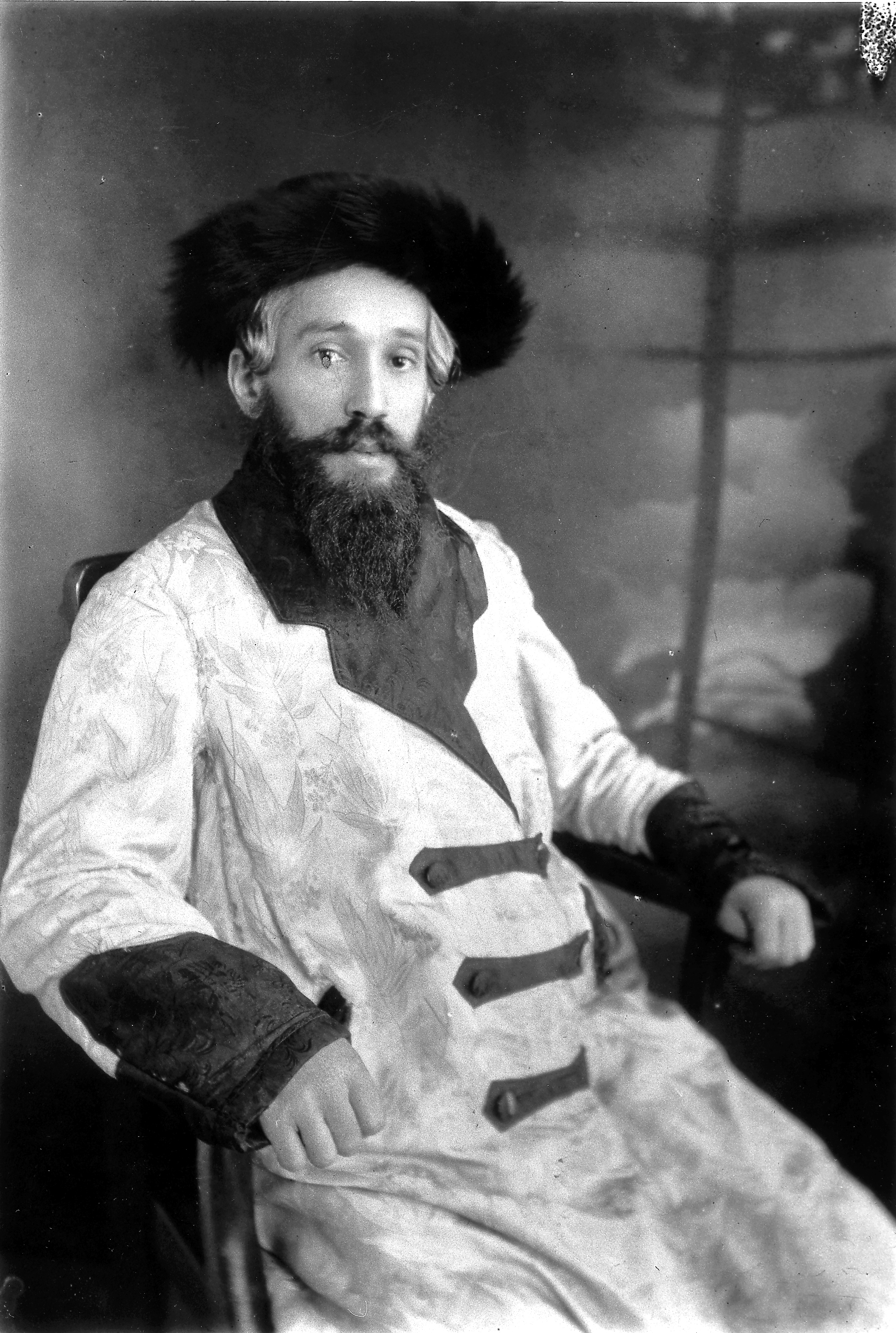
Grand Rabbi Yaakov Yisroel Korff of Zvhil-Mezhbizh, Boston

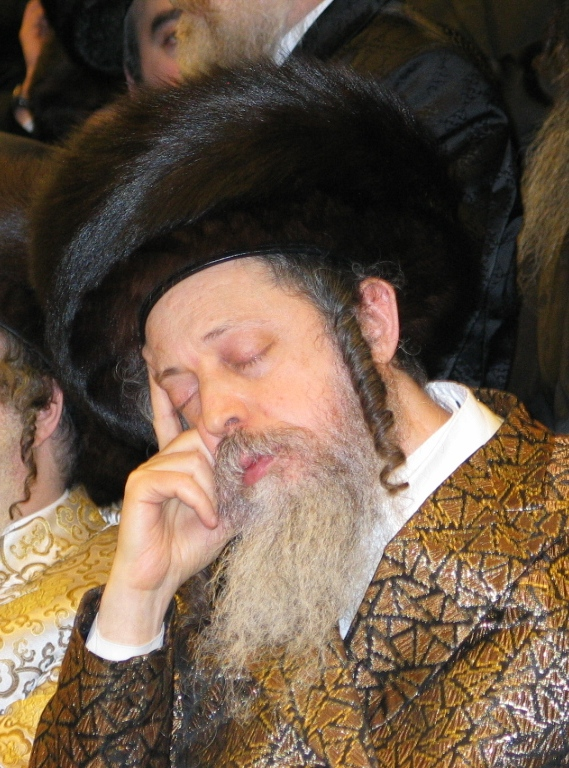
Grand Rabbi Shlomo Goldman, the Zvhiller Rebbe of Union City, New Jersey

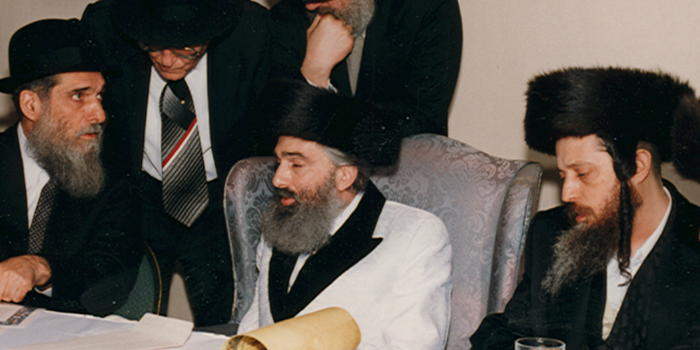
The present Zvhil-Mezhbizh Rebbe, Grand Rabbi Yitzhak Aharon Korff of Boston, Center, with cousins the late Tolner Rebbe (left), Rabbi Yitzhak Twersky of Boston, and the Grand Rabbi Shlomo Goldman, Zvhiller Rebbe of Union City

== See also ==
- Medzhibozh (Hasidic dynasty)
