= Melitz =

Polish Hasidic dynasty

Melitz was a Galician Hassidic dynastic sect, a branch of the Ropshitz Hasidic sect. The progenitor of the dynasty was Rabbi Ya'akov Horowitz, the son of Rabbi Naftali Zvi Horowitz of Ropshitz.

== Dynasty ==
- Rebbe Yaakov Horowitz of Melitz (c. 1784 (Note: This approximate date is preferred over several later dates.) – 1836 (Note: Alfasi has 19 Tevet 5597 [1836], but most other sources give 19 Tevet 5599 [1839] as his date of death. The former date, however, is in better accord with several family traditions.)), son of Rebbe Naftali Tzvi. His father appointed him as the rabbi of Kolbasov (Kolbuszowa). In about 1810, he was chosen by the Jews of Melitz (Mielec) to be the town's rabbi and was smuggled out of Kolbasov (as he was beloved by the townsfolk of Kolbasov, and they did not allow him to leave). In Melitz he began to officiate as a rebbe. His teachings were published from manuscript in c. 1994 [5754] as Zeraʻ Yaʻaḳov (זרע יעקב). Selected portions of this manuscript had been published previously.
  - Rebbe Yehuda Horowitz of Melitz (c. 1820 – 1879), son of Rebbe Yaakov. Married the daughter of Rebbe Chaim Meir Yechiel Shapiro of Mogielnica of the Kozhnitz dynasty.
    - Rebbe Naftali Horowitz of Melitz (died 1915), son of Rebbe Yehuda.
      - Rebbe Elimelech Horowitz of Melitz, son of Rebbe Naftali and son-in-law of Rebbe Tzvi Hersh Horowitz of Rozvadov (see below). He died in the Holocaust.
      - Rebbe Elazar Horowitz of Borov. He died in the Holocaust.
        - Rebbe Yechiel Mechel Moskowitz (1908–1956), Shotz-Melitzer Rebbe, son of Rebbe Shulem Moshkovitz of Shotz and son-in-law of Rebbe Elazar Horowitz.
          - Rebbe Naftali Asher Yeshayahu Moscowitz, Melitzer Rebbe of Ashdod.
      - Rebbe Menachem Mendel Horowitz of Melitz (c. 1883 – 1943), son of Rebbe Naftali. He married Frumet Beila, daughter of Rabbi Shmuel Shmelka Ezriel, the rabbi of Klasno near Wieliczka, and a great-granddaughter of Rebbe Yechezkel Shraga Halberstam of Shineva. He lived in Melitz where he was assistant rabbi and rebbe to his father. He died in the Holocaust in Radomishl (Radomyśl Wielki).
      - Rebbe Avraham Abish Horowitz of Spinka and Kruly (died 1944), son of Rebbe Naftali and son-in-law of Rebbe Yitzchak Eisik Weiss of Spinka. Rebbe Avraham Abish and his descendants continued his father-in-law's dynasty; see the lineage of the Horowitz branch of the Spinka dynasty. He died in the Holocaust.
      - Rebbe Yitzchak Horowitz (died 1978), Melitzer Rebbe of New York City. Author of Birkat Yitsḥak (ברכת יצחק), (New York, 1950).
    - Rebbe Yisrael Horowitz of Melitz, son of Rebbe Yehuda. His wife, Malka, was the daughter of his cousin, Rebbe Meir Horowitz of Dzhikov (see Dzhikov branch below).
      - Rebbe Chaim Meir Yechiel Horowitz of Raniżów, son of Rebbe Yisrael. He married Hesia, daughter of Rebbe Chananya Yom Tov Lipa Teitelbaum of Siget. He was the rabbi of Raniżów, then rebbe of Selish (Vynohradiv). He died in the Holocaust.
        His son-in-law, Rebbe Menachem Mendel Rubin of Muzhay (see below Ropshitz branch) succeeded him as the rebbe of Selish.)
      - Rebbe Yaakov Horowitz, Melitz-Dzhikover Rebbe of Tarnów, son of Rebbe Yisrael, died in the Holocaust. (Note: A radically different version of the genealogy of Melitz-Dzhikov dynasty is attributed to Rebbe Yitzchak David Horowitz of São Paulo. Among other major differences, Rebbe Yisrael, father of Rebbe Yaakov of Melitz-Dzhikov, is said to be the son of Rebbe Chanina of Ulanov and the son-in-law of Rebbe Yehuda of Melitz, not the son of Rebbe Yehuda of Melitz and son-in-law of Rebbe Meir of Dzhikov.)
        - Rebbe Yehuda Horowitz, Melitz-Dzhikover Rebbe of Tarnów, son of Rebbe Yaakov, died in the Holocaust. His wife was the granddaughter of Rebbe Abish Frankel (son-in-law of Rebbi Yaakov Horowitz [the first] of Melitz) and of Rebbe Chanina Horowitz of Ulanov (see below).
          - Rebbe Yehoshua Horowitz Melitz-Dzhikover Rebbe of Tarnów, son of Rebbe Yehuda, died in the Holocaust.
            - Rebbe Eliezer Horowitz (died 1997), Melitz-Turner Rebbe of Bnei Brak and Borough Park, Brooklyn, New York, son of Rebbe Yehoshua and son-in-law of Rabbi Yeruchem Bernstein of Jerusalem, a descendant of the Lelov dynasty.
              - Rebbe Shia Horowitz, Melitzer Rebbe of Borough Park, Brooklyn, son of Rebbe Eliezer.
              - Rebbe Avraham Yaakov Horowitz, Dzhikov-Melitzer Rebbe of Monsey, New York, son of Rebbe Eliezer and son-in-law of Rebbe Mendel Wagschal, Shinever Rebbe of Monsey (of the Lantzut dynasty).
              - Rebbe Yitzchak David Horowitz, son of Rebbe Eliezer and son-in-law of Rebbe Yoel Beer, the Ratzferter Rebbe of São Paulo, of the Sanz dynasty. Rabbi of the Hasidic community of São Paulo.
  - Rebbe Chanina Horowitz of Ulaniv (died 1881), son of Rebbe Yaakov and son-in-law of his uncle, Rebbe Eliezer Horowitz of Dzhikov (see Dzhikov branch below).
  - Rebbe Avraham (Note: In most sources he is called "Avraham" alone, except for by Vunder who calls him "Avraham Aba", which he later retracts.) Horowitz of Shendishov (1823–1905), son of Rebbe Yaakov.
    - Rebbe Alter Zev Horowitz of Strizhov (died 1920), son of Rebbe Avraham
    - Rebbe Asher Yerucham Horowitz (c. 1869 – 1955), Shendishover Rebbe of New York, son of Rebbe Avraham. In Poland, he lived in Piantikov. He emigrated to the United States in the late 1920s. The rest of his family died in the Holocaust. He lived in Williamsburg, Brooklyn.

== Rabbi Naftali Asher Yeshayahu Moscowitz ==
Grand Rabbi Naftali Asher Yeshayahu Moscowitz is the current Melitzer Rebbe of Ashdod, Israel and author of the Peiros Hailan halachic discourses on the laws of Chol HaMoed and the Nefesh Chaya a commentary and linear interpretation of the Book of Psalms.

The Melitzer Rebbe is the grandson of the Shotzer Rebbe of London, and a seventh generation patrilineal descendant of Rebbe Yechiel Michal of Zolochiv. His saintly grandfathers also include the Baal Shem Tov, The Degel Machane Ephraim, The Noam Elimelech, Rebbe Meir of Premishlan, Rebbe Naftali Zvi of Ropshitz, and other well-known tzaddikim.

Grand Rabbi Moscowitz is married to Mrs. Shaindel Kahana Stern of London, daughter of an understudy of the Shotzer Rov of London, the Melitzer rebbe's grandfather.

In 1996, Rabbi Lazer Brody who is a Melitzer Chosid, became the understudy of The Melitzer Rebbe, a position he kept for two years.
