= Hayyim Tyrer =

Hasidic rabbi and kabbalist

Rabbi Hayyim ben Solomon Tyrer

Personal life
- Born: ~1740 Buchach, Ukraine
- Died: 1813 Jerusalem, Ottoman Empire
- Notable work(s): Sidduro shel Shabbat, Be'er Mayim Ḥayyim, Sha'ar ha-Tefillah, Ereẓ ha-Ḥayyim
- Known for: Author of Sidduro shel Shabbat, Be'er Mayim Ḥayyim, Sha'ar ha-Tefillah, Ereẓ ha-Ḥayyim
- Occupation: Rabbi, kabbalist

Religious life
- Religion: Judaism

Hayyim ben Solomon Tyrer (Hebrew: חיים בן שלמה טירר) was an important Hasidic rabbi and kabbalist, and is today remembered for several well known Hasidic works. He is also known as "Hayyim of Czernowitz", after his time there.

He was a pupil of Rabbi Yechiel Michl (the Maggid of Zlotshev), as well as of the Maggid of Mezritch; both in turn direct pupils of the Baal Shem Tov. After he had been rabbi at five different towns, among them Mogilev, Czernowitz and Botoșani, he settled in Jerusalem. In 1812, he founded the Great Synagogue on Asiiskaya Street on the right bank of the river Byk (no later than 1812, he also founded the first Jewish hospital in the city). He died in Jerusalem in 1813, and was buried in a cave in the Jewish cemetery of Safed.

He was the author of:

- Sidduro shel Shabbat, kabbalistic homilies on Shabbat-related subjects (Poryck, 1818)
- Be'er Mayim Ḥayyim, novellæ on the Pentateuch, in two parts (Czernowitz, pt. i. 1820, pt. ii. 1849)
- Sha'ar ha-Tefillah, kabbalistic reflections on prayer (Sudilkov, 1837)
- Ereẓ ha-Ḥayyim, in two parts: (1) a homiletic commentary on the Prophets and Hagiographa, and (2) novellæ on the tractate Berakhot (Czernowitz, 1861)

He is mentioned by Rabbi Sender Margalioth in his responsa on Shulchan Aruch, Even Ha'ezer.

Streets named after him are "Beer Maim Hayyim" (as the name of his better-known book) in Rehovot and in Ramat Elchanan neighborhood in Bnei Brak, as well as "Ma'ale Beer Maim Haim" street in the Beit Vagan neighborhood in Jerusalem
