= Mezhbizh =

Town in Medzhybizh, Ukraine

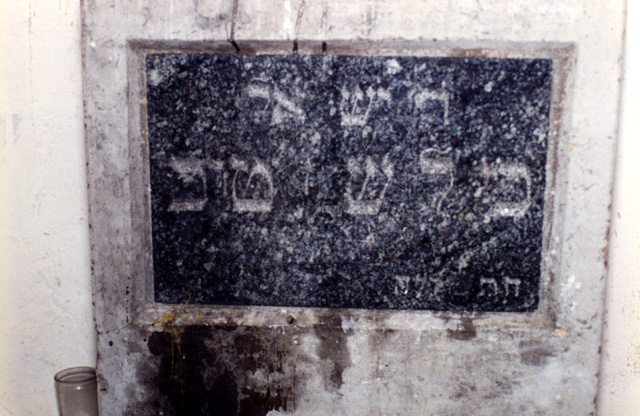
Headstone of the Baal Shem Tov in Mezhbizh

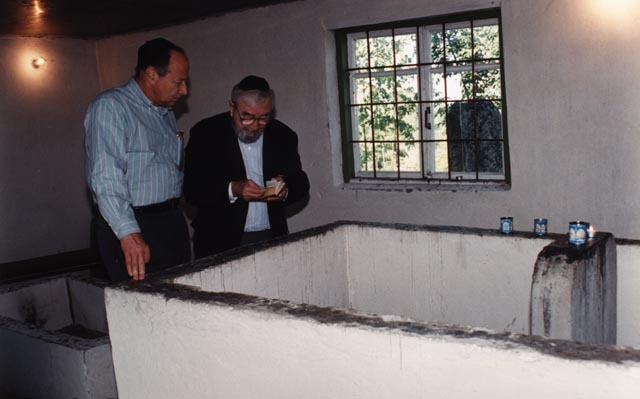
The grave of the Baal Shem Tov in Mezhbizh

Mezhbizh (also spelled as Medzibuz, Mezbuz, Mez'buz, and in various other ways, transcribed from various Yiddish dialects) is the name of the town of Medzhybizh in the present Ukraine which is significant as both the source of a Hasidic dynasty that bears its name and as a symbolic name for the roots of Hasidism.

The Mezhbizh dynasty served as the earliest "trunk" of Hasidic Judaism, led by the Baal Shem Tov and his direct descendants.

== The town of Mezhbizh in Hasidic history ==
The Mezhbizh dynasty is more than just a branch of Hasidic Judaism because it was the small town from where Hasidism eventually spread throughout the Jewish communities of Eastern Europe.

Geographically, the Hasidic movement originated in Mezhbizh, where the movement's founder, Yisroel ben Eliezer, made his home, bet midrash (a synagogue and place of Torah study), held court, and is buried. He came to be known as the Baal Shem Tov ("master [of the] good name" in Hebrew), abbreviated as Besht, a name applied to various Jewish miracle workers in the Middle Ages.

== The Hasidic dynasty of Mezhbizh ==
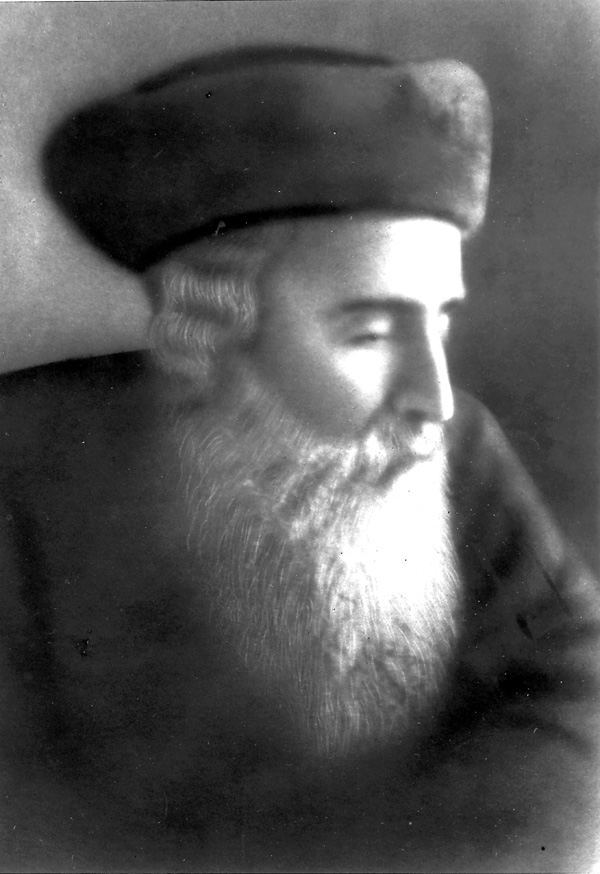
Grand Rabbi Mordechai of Mezhbizh, the last rebbe in Mezhbizh.

Besides the position of the Mezhbizh dynasty as a "trunk" of Hasidic Judaism, an important branch of Hasidism led by the Baal Shem Tov's descendants and heirs evolved from there as well.

The Baal Shem Tov's grandson, Reb Boruch (known in his childhood as Reb Boruch'l, a Yiddish diminutive, and subsequently as Reb Boruch'l HaKadosh) was the first "rebbe" of the Hasidic movement to hold court in Mezhbizh in his grandfather's home and Beis Medrash, which he inherited. He was the son of R' Yechiel Mikhl Ashkenazi and Udl, only daughter of the Baal Shem Tov.

As recorded in the early Hasidic work Mekor Boruch (first published in 1880 from handwritten manuscripts), at the time of the Baal Shem Tov's death, Reb Pinchos of Korets and Reb Yosef of Polonoe, two of the Baal Shem Tov's closest followers, reported to the Hasidim that the Baal Shem Tov had designated Reb Boruch as his successor, and instructed Reb Pinchos to take responsibility for carrying out those wishes. Reb Boruch was not yet bar mitzvah (under 13 years) at the time of his grandfather's death, and he was then taken to live in Reb Pinchos' home, where the Baal Shem Tov's other close Hasidim and other leaders of the Hasidic movement visited regularly to check on his progress and assist with his preparation to assume his grandfather's mantle.

Reb Boruch remained with Reb Pinchos of Korets until the Chevraya Kadisha ("holy circle"), as the close inner circle of the Baal Shem Tov was known, decided that he was ready to return to Mezhbizh and become "The Rebbe." When he finally returned to Mezhbizh, all of the Hasidic leaders of that time regularly visited Reb Boruch, including the Maggid of Chernobyl, the Magid of Mezritch, Reb Shneur Zalman of Liadi (founder of the Chabad-Lubavitch Hasidic movement), and others.

From Reb Boruch the mantle of leadership was inherited by his son-in-law Reb Yitzchok Drubitsher, who was a son of Reb Yosef of Yampol, the son of Reb Yechiel Michl, the Magid of Zlotshov. Reb Yitzchok's son, Reb Yechiel Michl (known as Reb Mekhl Drubitsher), succeeded him, followed by his son, Reb Mordechai. Both Reb Yechiel Michl and his son Reb Mordechai married descendants of the Chernobyl Hasidic dynasty.

The last rebbe of this lineage to be born in Mezhbizh was Grand Rabbi Yaakov Yisroel Korff. Son of the last Mezhbizher Rebbe, Reb Mordechai, he was a direct descendant of the Baal Shem Tov and his grandson, Reb Boruch of Mezhbizh (the first Rebbe), and the Hasidic dynasties of the Rebbes of Mezhbizh, Chernobyl, Karlin, Ryzhin, and Apt. Reb Yaakov Yisroel married the daughter of the Zvhiller Rebbe of that time, Reb Yichiel Michl. He subsequently succeeded his father-in-law as Zvhiller Rebbe until his own father, Reb Mordechai of Mezhbizh died, after which he then became the Zvhil-Mezhbizh Rebbe, continuing the dynasty after his father, although he continued to be known as the Zvhiller Rebbe (see also Zvhil (Hasidic dynasty).

== Lineage of the Mezhbizh dynasty ==
- 1. Rebbe Yisroel Baal Shem Tov (1698-1760) - founder of Hasidism
  - Rabbi Tsvi of Pinsk (died 1780) - (son of the Baal Shem Tov; served as an admor for only one year).
    - Rebbe Aharon of Titiov (died 1800) – son of Rabbi Tsvi.
      - Rabbi Hershl of Skver - son of Rebbe Aharon
    - Rebbe Dov Ber of Ulanov – son of Rabbi Tsvi.
  - Rabbi Yechiel Mikhl Ashkenazi of Tulchyn - married Udl, daughter of the Baal Shem Tov
    - 2. Rebbe Boruch of Mezhbizh (1753-1811) - author of Butsina diNehoiro - (son of Rabbi Yechiel Mikhl; son-in-law of R. Aharon of Titiov).
      - Rebbe Yitschak Drubitsher (son-in-law of Rebbe Boruch, son of Rabbi Yosef of Yampol, son of Rabbi Yekhiel Mikhl of Zlotshev; succeeded his father-in-law as rebbe in Mezhbizh).
        - Rebbe Yekhiel Mikhl (son of Rebbe Yitschak; son-in-law of Rebbe Motl of Chernobyl)
          - Rebbe Mordechai of Mezhbizh (son of Rebbe Yekhiel Mikhl)
            - Rebbe Yakov Israel Korff (son of Rebbe Mordechai, son-in-law of Rebbe Yekhiel Mikhl of Zvhil-Korets)
              - Rebbe Itzhak Aron Korff (grandson of Rebbe Yakov Israel)
        - Rebbe Boruch Rabinovich of Yas
          - Rebbe Eliezer Chaim of Skolye (died 1916) (the first rebbe in America) – son of Rebbe Boruch
            - Rebbe Shmuel Avrohom of Mezhbizh (1883- ) – son of Rebbe Eliezer Chaim
      - Rabbi Yaakov Pinchos Averbuch/Auerbach (son-in-law of Rebbe Boruch).
        - Rabbi Israel of Mezhbizh – (son of Rabbi Yaakov Pinchos).

== Mezhbizher Rebbe today ==
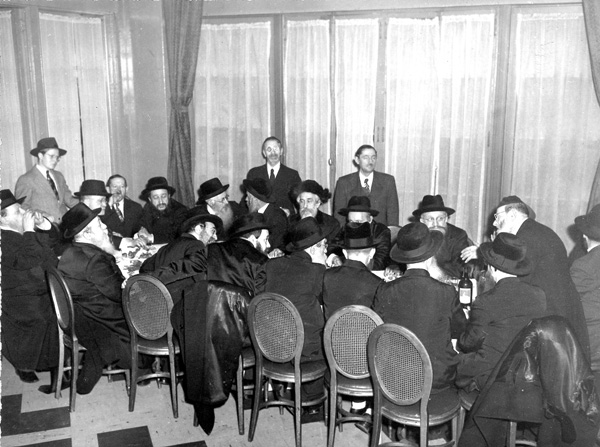
Grand Rabbi Yaakov Yisroel Korff, Zvill-Mezhbizher Rebbe, son of Grand Rabbi Mordechai of Mezhbizh, hosting a family tish (lit: "table"; a celebratory meal) in 1947 with the rebbes of Skver, Novominsk, Rachmastrivka, Kopiczynitz, Boyan, Chernobyl, Loyev, Koson, Kobrin, Shotz, Brod, and Tolna-Vizhnitz

=== Zvhil-Mezhbizh of Boston ===
The late rebbe's grandson, Grand Rabbi Yitzhak Aharon Korff is the present Zvhil-Mezhbizh Rebbe.
