= Zlotshov (Hasidic dynasty) =

Ukrainian Hasidic dynasty

Zlotshov is the name of a Hasidic dynasty founded by Rebbe Yechiel Michel; Zlotshov or Zlotshev is the Yiddish name of Zolochiv, a town in present-day Ukraine. Known as the "Maggid of Zlotchev", Yechiel Michel (1726 - the 25th of Elul 5546/18 September 1786) was a disciple of the Baal Shem Tov, the founder of Hasidism, and of the Maggid of Mezritch.

Yechiel Mechel's five sons, in turn, all founded their own branches of the Zlotshov dynasty. Descendant dynasties include the Zvhil, Skolye, Zvhil-Mezhbizh and Shotz dynasties. Rabbi Yechiel Michel Michlowitz (from Michalovce), known as the Zlotshover Rebbe of Netanya (died January 13, 2015), claimed descent from the dynasty's founder, but his exact lineage is unknown.
