= Perek Shira =

Ancient Jewish text

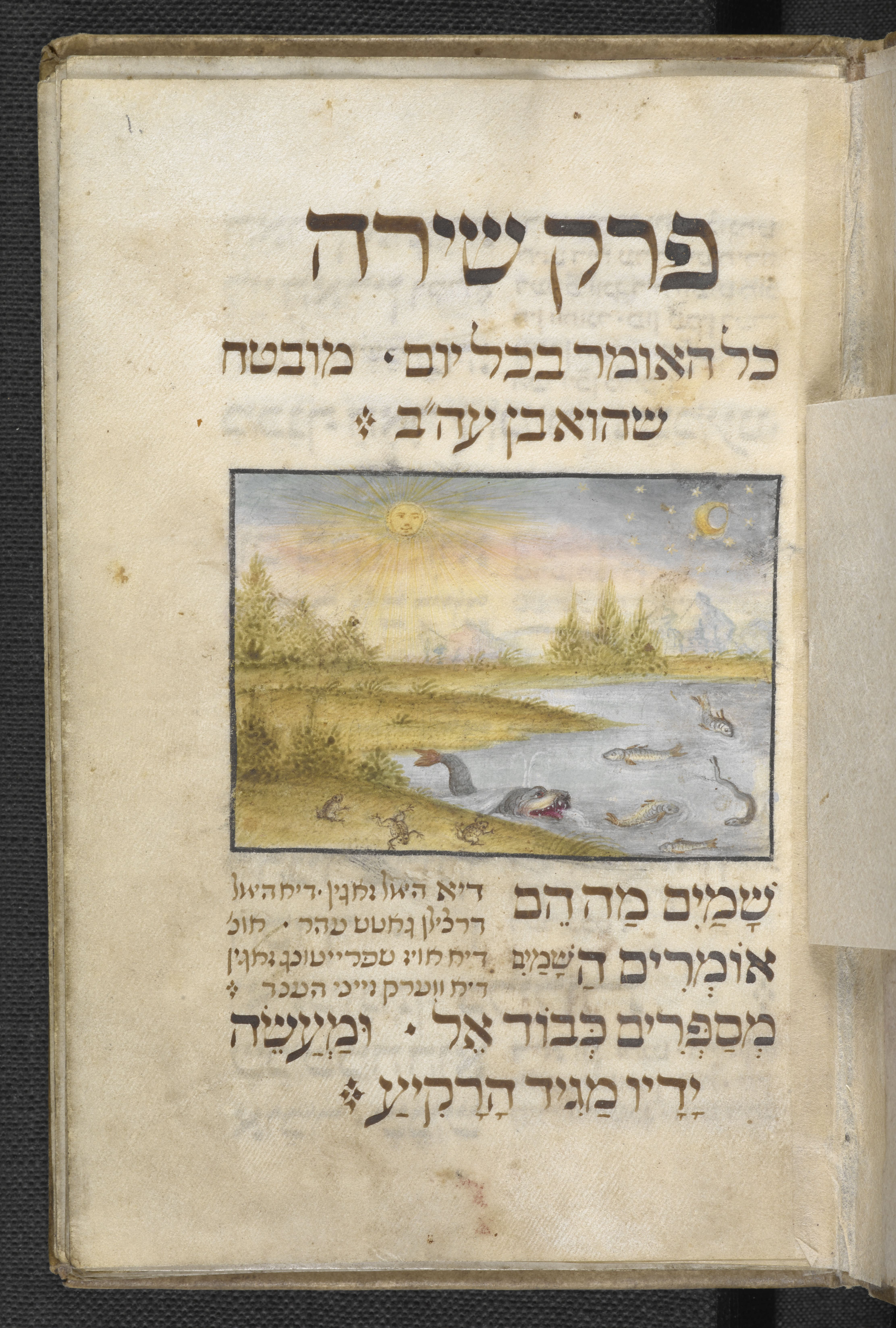
Title page of Perek Shira in an 18th-century illuminated manuscript.

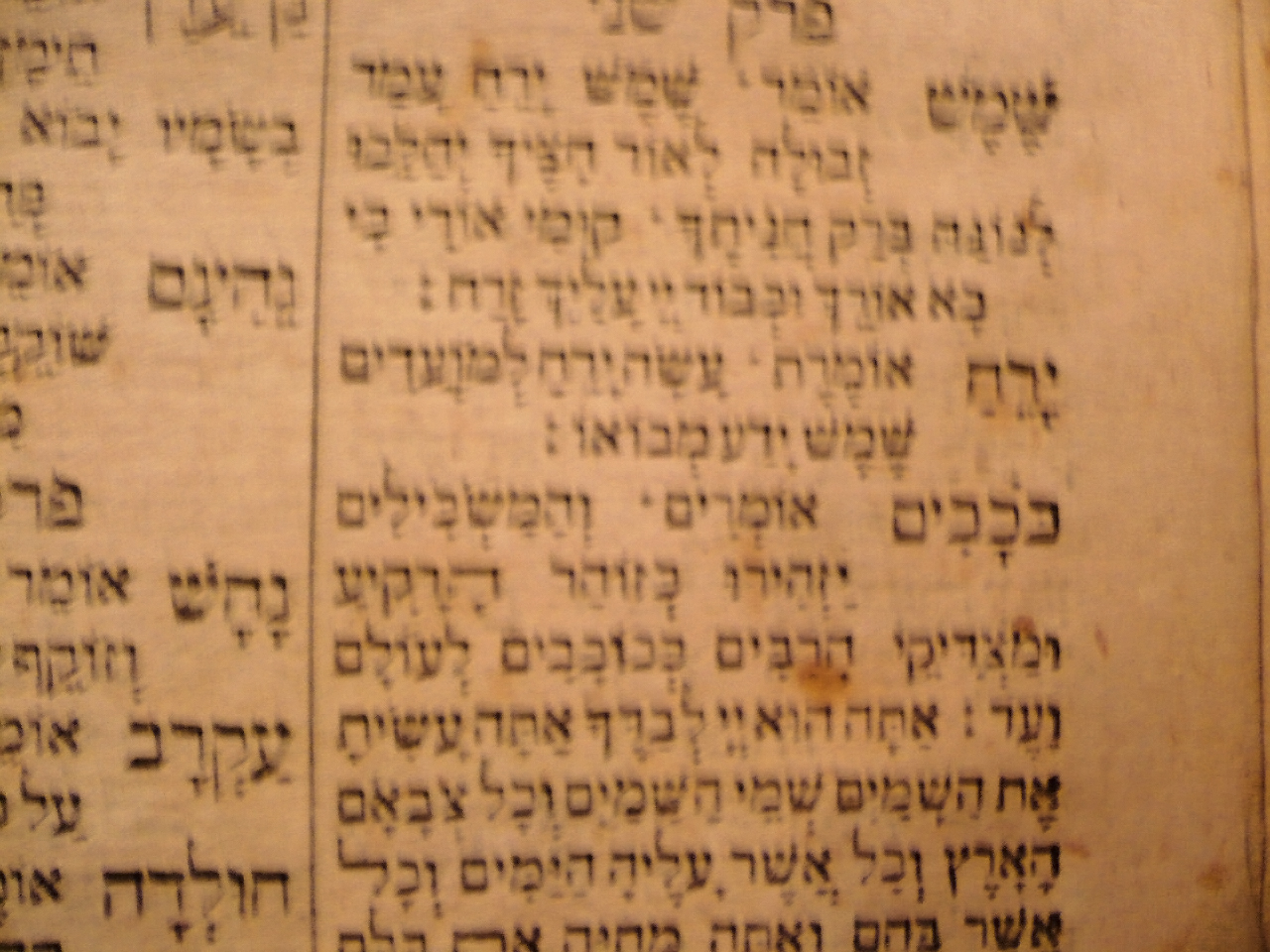
A close up of Perek Shira from a 17th-century Dutch Siddur

Perek Shira (Hebrew פרק שירה, lit. "Chapter of Song") is an ancient Jewish text. There are a number of versions extant, some associated with the Ashkenazic tradition, some with the Sephardic, and some with the Mizrahi Jews tradition. It was first printed, with a commentary, in Moses ben Joseph de Trani's Bet Elohim (1576), but it is mentioned as early as the 10th century. It contains 85 sections, in each of which elements of creation, beginning with the celestial and ending with dogs, use biblical and rabbinic verses in order to sing God's praises. Use of Perek Shira used to be prevalent in the daily liturgy and medieval philosopher Joseph Albo wrote that whoever recites Perek Shira is guaranteed a place in the World to Come.

== Content ==
Though Perek Shira means "Chapter of Song", the book is actually organized into six chapters. Some of the utilized verses make mention of the speaker. For example, the song begins with the heavens who say, "the heavens speak of the glory of God, and of His handiwork the skies tell." (Psalms 19:2) Others describe some characteristic or activity of the speaker, e.g., the book ends with the dogs who say "come, let us prostrate and bend our knees, and kneel before God our maker" (Psalms 95:6).

The vast majority of the verses of Perek Shira are biblical, and most of these are from the book of Psalms, but there are also a few verses from the Babylonian Talmud, at least one from Kabbalistic literature, and a very few whose source is unknown. Some of the birds and animals listed are difficult to identify. It appears that all the creatures named are found in the Holy Land, the only exceptions perhaps being the elephant (whose song is Psalms 92:6) - but elephants were brought into the Holy Land by foreign armies, as mentioned, for example, in the First Book of Maccabees; and the leviathan (whose song is Psalms 136:1), presumably a mythic sea beast mentioned in the Bible.

In modern times, Perek Shira does not often appear liturgically. However, there are many publishers who publish Perek Shira as a separate entity, anywhere from a wallet-sized booklet to full-sized coffee table books complete with pictures illustrating each of the characters speaking to God.

== See also ==
- Psalm 19, Psalm 92, Psalm 95, Psalm 136, Psalm 150
