= Boruch of Medzhybizh =

Rabbi (1753–1811)

- Title: Rabbi

Personal life
- Born: Boruch (of Medzhybizh); 1753 Medzhybizh, Podolia Governorate, Russian Empire
- Died: 4 December 1811 (aged 57–58) Medzhybizh, Podolia Governorate, Russian Empire
- Buried: Medzhybizh
- Spouse: 1: ??, née Katskes; 2: Sima Chusha
- Children: 3 daughters
- Parents: Yechiel of Tulchyn (father); Udl (daughter of Baal Shem Tov) (mother)
- Dynasty: Mezhbizh

Religious life
- Religion: Judaism

Jewish leader
- Began: 1782
- Ended: 4 December 1811, 18 Kislev 5572.
- Main work: Butsino diNhoiro
- Dynasty: Mezhbizh

Boruch of Medzhybizh (1753–1811), was a grandson of the Baal Shem Tov, the founder of Hasidic Judaism.

In his later years Boruch became depressed and his followers brought in Hershel of Ostropol as a court jester of sorts. Hershel was one of the first documented Jewish comics. One tale has Hershel lingering for several days and dying in Boruch's own bed surrounded by Boruch and his followers.

When Boruch died in 1811 on 18 Kislev 5572 (4 December 1811), his chasidim (followers) numbered in the thousands.

== Bibliography ==
- Wiesel, Elie, 1978, Four Hasidic masters and their struggle against melancholy: ISBN 0-268-00944-9 University of Notre Dame Press.
