= Yechiel Michel of Zlotshov =

Hasidic rabbi (1725/1726–1781)

Rabbi Yechiel Michel of Zloczow

Personal life
- Born: 1725/1726 Brody, Galicia, Polish–Lithuanian Commonwealth
- Died: 15 September 1781 Yampil, Polish–Lithuanian Commonwealth
- Buried: Ohel of the Righteous, Yampil, Poland-Lithuania
- Parent: Yitzhak of Drohobych (father)
- Dynasty: Zlotshov

Religious life
- Religion: Judaism

Jewish leader
- Synagogue: In Zloczow
- Yahrtzeit: 25 Elul
- Dynasty: Zlotshov

Rabbi Yechiel Michel of Zloczow (Hebrew: יחיאל מיכל מזלוטשוב) (1725/1726 – 15 September 1781), known as The Maggid of Zloczow, was one of the disciples of the Baal Shem Tov and the Maggid of Mezeritch.

== Biography ==
Yechiel was born in Brody (modern-day Ukraine) in 1726. His father, Rabbi Yitzhak of Drohobych, initially opposed the teachings of the Baal Shem Tov, but later became a fan of his and sent Yechiel to study with him. On his father's side, he was attributed to a large family of rabbis and tzaddikim. His grandfather was rabbi Yosef Safravidliwer, rabbi of Pistyn. His great-grandfather was Rabbi Moshe of Swierz. He was the brother of Rabbi Yosef Drobitzer, Chief Judge of Medzhybizh. He married Sarah Rakhil.

After the death of the Besht, he began to lead a congregation and also visited the Maggid many times. He excelled in leadership with holiness and asceticism, especially in keeping the covenant. He was gifted with incredible preaching talent, and his reputation grew as a storyteller. He became the Maggid Misharim in the communities of Brody, Kalk, Zloczow, and Yampol. He used to pray late into the night and claimed that like the tribe of Dan that marched to the end of Israel and collected their losses, he collected all prayers that were unintentional and brought them back to their source. He was a spiritual rabbi who spent much time on Kabbalah.

In the final years of his life, Yechiel gained wealth and said that it expanded his mind to serve God. He served as Maggid in Zloczow until his death on the 25th of Elul, and was buried in Yampil.

Yechiel did not write any books, but his progeny and pupils often quoted his sayings in their works. Years later, Rabbi Nathan Neta Donner published a collection of his sayings called "Many Waters" (מים רבים). Among his disciples were:

- Rabbi Issachar Ber of Zloczow
- Rabbi Hayyim Tyrer
- Rabbi Avraham Mordechai of Pinczow
- Rabbi Meshullam Feivush Heller
- Rabbi David Solomon Eibenschutz
- Rabbi Mordechai Menschiz

=== Composing ===
Rabbi Yechiel composed many melodies during his time as Rabbi. His most famous song was "Awakening Many Mercies" (התעוררות רחמים רבים). Hasidic tradition states that at the time of his death, the Baal Shem Tov asked his disciples to sing the melody, and at the end promised that every person who joined in the song would feel a feeling of repentance at any time and that he would join in singing in his soul and arouse a great mercy on him before God.

Motifs from the melody were included in Ernest Bloch's second movement of Mélodie. In 2013, a CD titled "Many Mercies" (רחמים רבים) was released, with ten melodies on the track being attributed by tradition to Yechiel.

== Family ==
Yechiel and his wife Sarah Rakhil had one daughter and five sons, of whom the community used to say: "Five cedars, good plantings which he planted and blossomed all over the world, which are said to be paired to the five books of the Torah."

- Rabbi Yosef of Yampol, progenitor of the Yampol dynasty
- Rabbi Yitzhak of Radvil, progenitor of the Radville dynasty
- Rabbi Zev Wolf of Zbaraz, rabbi in the town of Zbarazh
- Rabbi Moshe of Zvhil, founder of the Zvhil dynasty
- Rabbi Mordechai of Kremnitz, rabbi in the town of Kremenets
- Rebbetzin Miriam, who married David of Stepin in a second marriage

His father was Rabbi Yitzhak of Drohobych, a disciple of the Besht. Yitzhak's father was Rabbi Yosef of Pistyn, nicknamed "Rabbi Yosef Ish Emet". Yitzhak's mother was Yanta, nicknamed "Yanta the Prophet". Yosef's father was Rabbi Moshe of Swierz.

According to family tradition, Yechiel was the scion of a privileged family from Galicia that lived and worked in the town of Brody and its shtetls. The beginning of the dynasty is attributed to Rabbi Yitzchak Hayut (1538 – 1610), whose family supposedly descends from Rashi and King David. The veracity of these claims is not currently verified.
