= Mukachevo =

City in Zakarpattia Oblast, Ukraine

Mukachevo Мукачево (Ukrainian) Мукачово (Rusyn)
- City
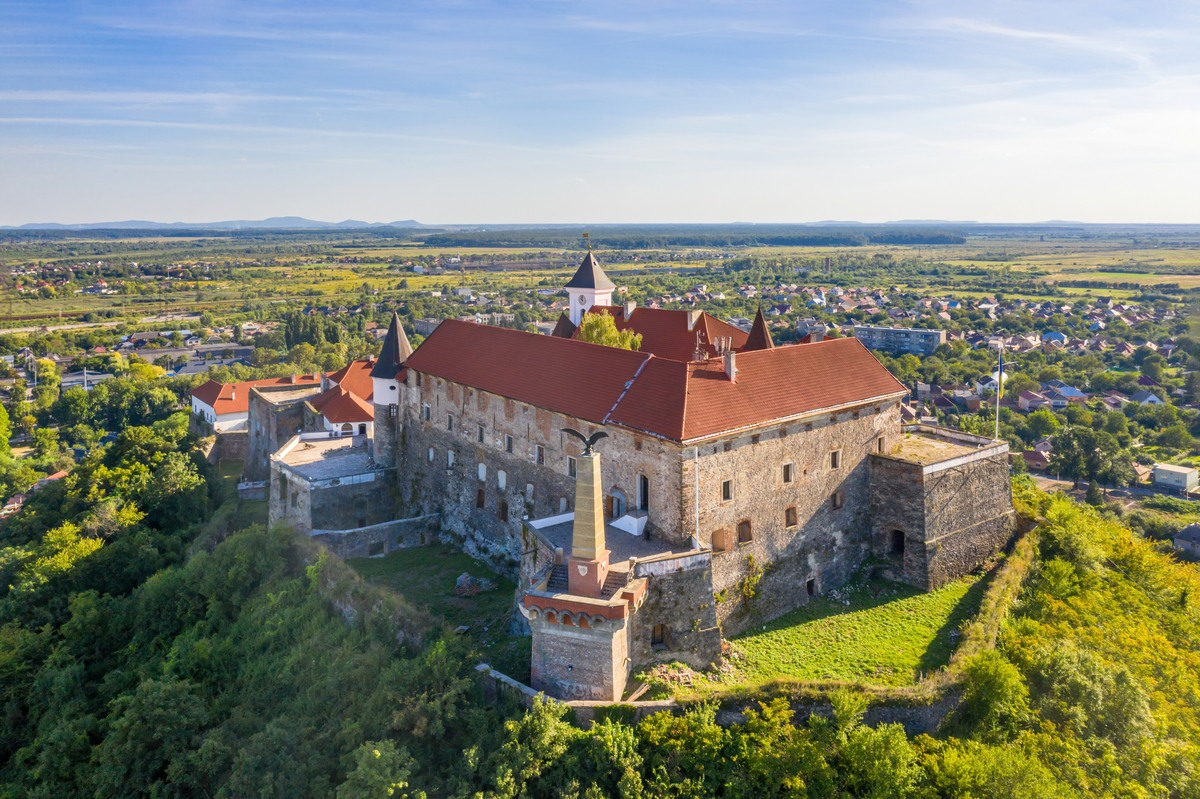
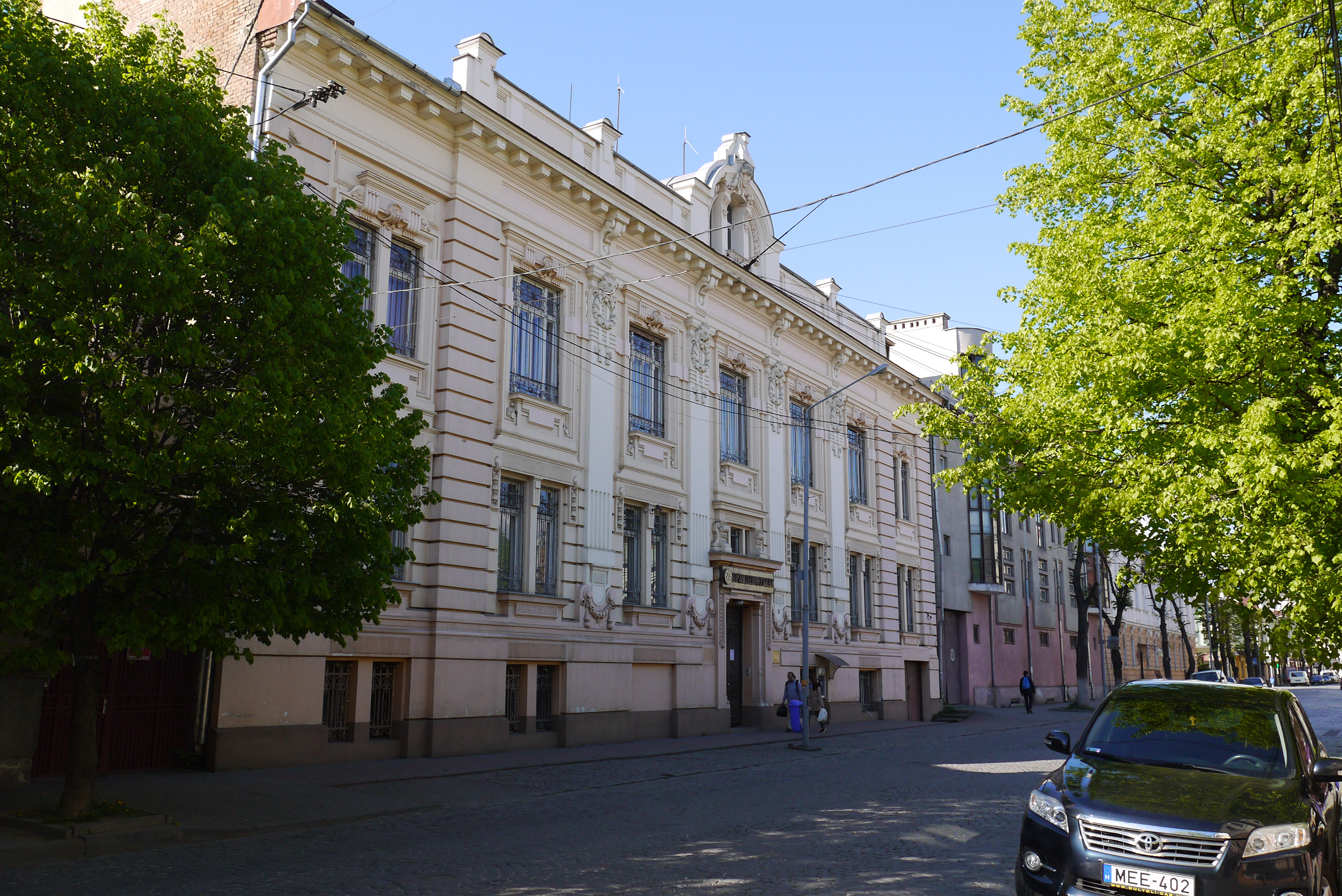
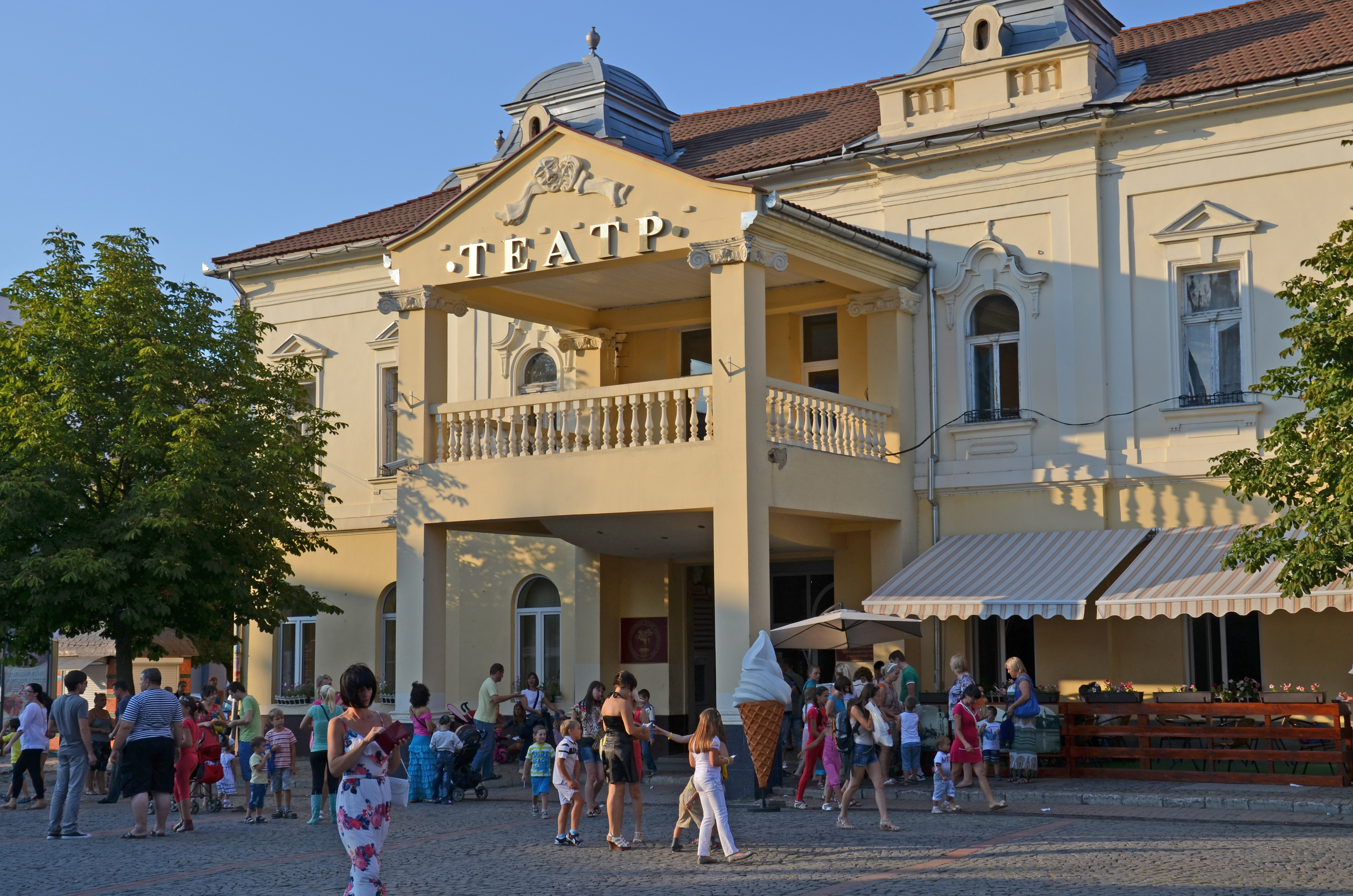
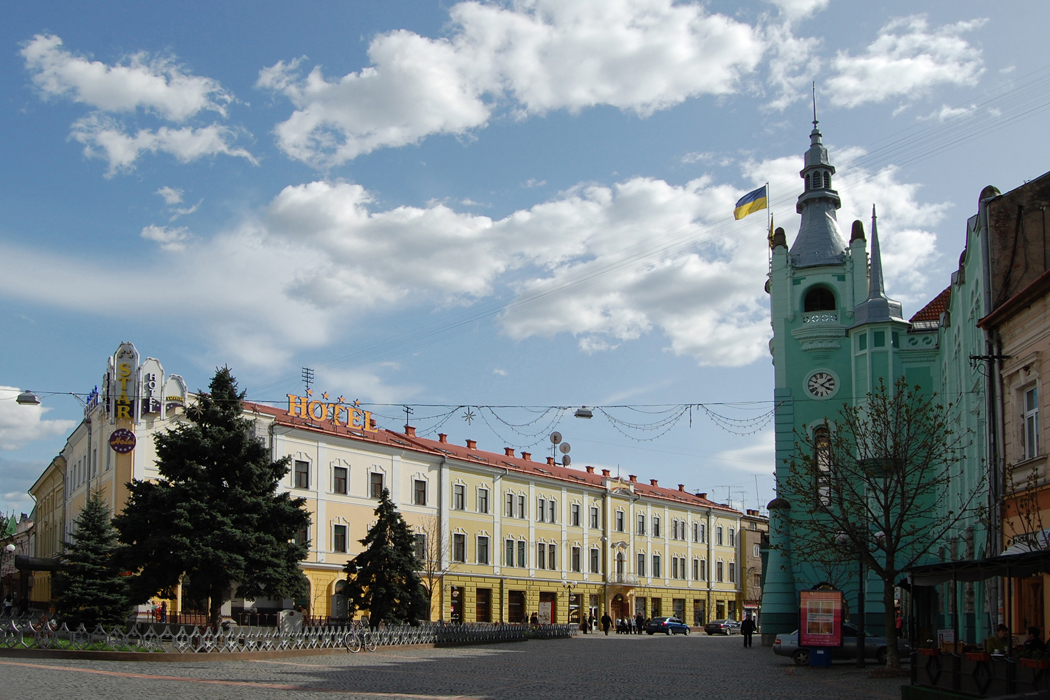
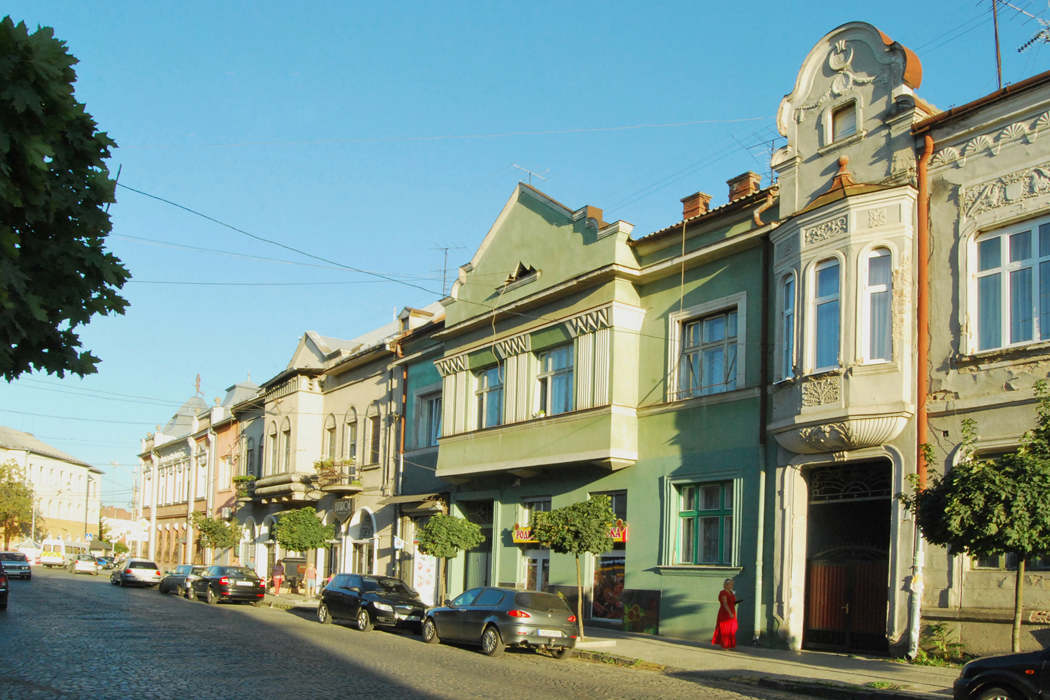
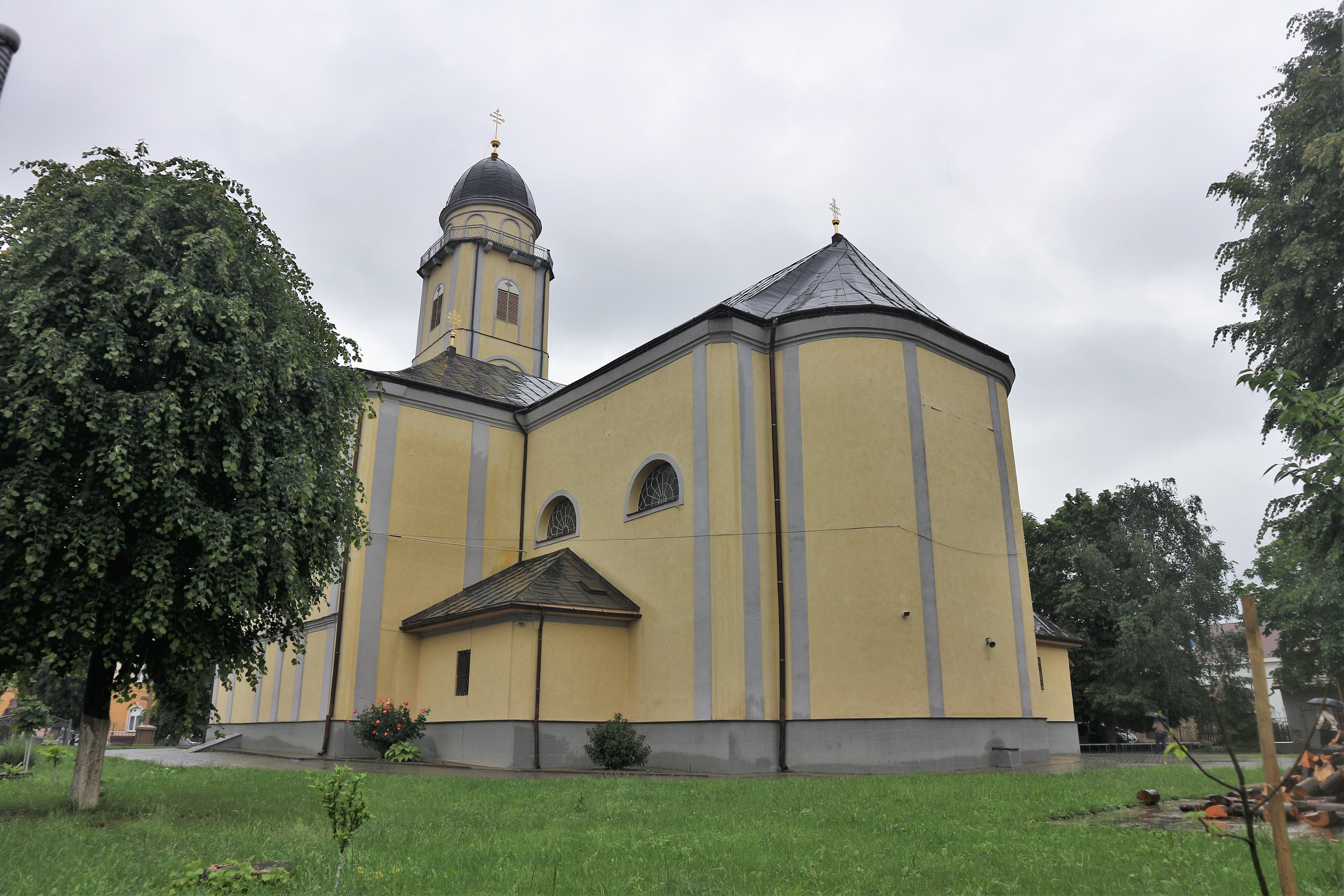
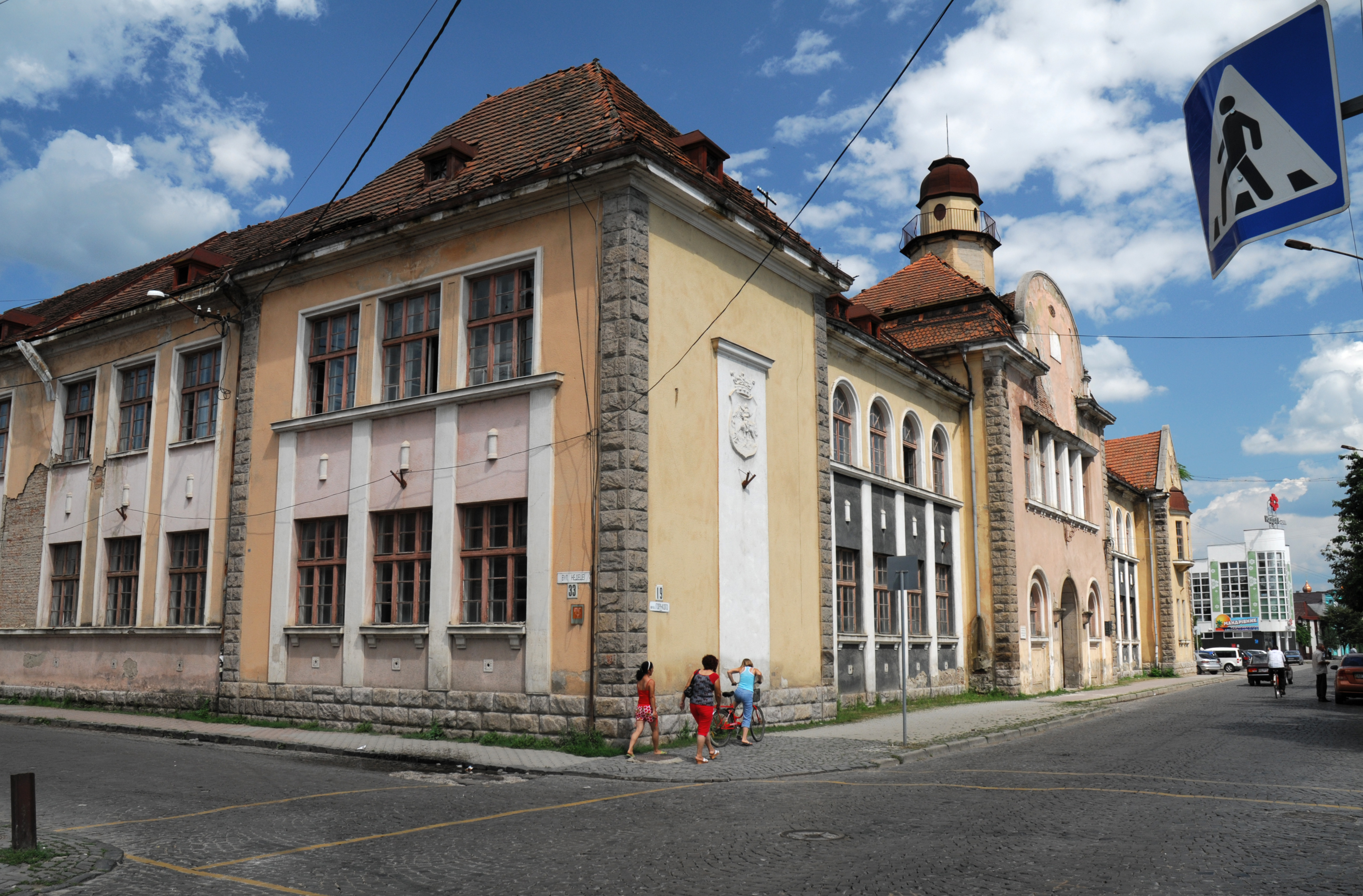
- Palanok Castle Bank Building Drama Theatre Town Hall and Hotel Zirka Ilona Zrínyi Street Dormition Cathedral Academy

- Flag Coat of arms

- Location of Mukachevo in Zakarpattia Oblast Location of Mukachevo in Ukraine
- Coordinates: 48°27′00″N 22°45′00″E
- Country: Ukraine
- Oblast: Zakarpattia Oblast
- Raion: Mukachevo Raion
- Hromada: Mukachevo urban hromada
- Founded: 896

Government
  - Mayor: Andriy Baloha

Area
  - Land: 27.9 km^{2} (10.8 sq mi)
- Elevation: 125 m (410 ft)

Population (2022)
  - Total: 85,569
  - Density: 3,187/km^{2} (8,250/sq mi)
- Time zone: UTC+2 (EET)
  - Summer (DST): UTC+3 (EEST)
- Postal code: 89600
- Area code: +380 3131
- Climate: Cfb
- Website: Mukachevo City Council

Mukachevo (Ukrainian: Мукачево, IPA: [mʊˈkɑtʃewo]; Hungarian: Munkács, IPA: [ˈmuŋkaːtʃ]; see name section) is a city in Zakarpattia Oblast, western Ukraine. It is situated in the valley of the Latorica River and serves as the administrative center of Mukachevo Raion. The city is a rail terminus and highway junction, and has beer, wine, tobacco, food, textile, timber, and furniture industries. During the Cold War, it was home to Mukachevo air base and a radar station.

Mukachevo lies close to the borders of four neighbouring countries: Poland, Slovakia, Hungary, and Romania. Today, the population is 85,569 (2022 estimate). The city is a traditional stronghold of the Rusyn language, and the population of Mukachevo is officially reported as 77.1% ethnic Ukrainian. There are also significant minorities of: Russians (9.0%); Hungarians (8.5%); Germans (1.9%); and Roma (1.4%).

While Uzhhorod is the main administrative city in the region, Mukachevo is a historic spiritual center of the region and center of the former Eastern Orthodox eparchy of Kyivan Metropolis. In the 17th century it united with the Catholic church by the Union of Uzhhorod, similar to the Union of Brest. Up until World War II and the Holocaust, Mukachevo was primarily a Jewish town, and half the population was Jewish (see below). The population comprised Rusyns, Hungarians, Slovaks, and other minorities. Formerly in Czechoslovakia, and before that in Hungary, it was incorporated into Soviet Ukraine after World War II.

== Name ==
Most probably, the name derives from the Hungarian surname Muncas—munkás ('worker')—which later transformed into Munkács. Another theory suggests that the name contains the Proto-Slavic root word *muka meaning 'flour'.

On 23 May 2017, the Ukrainian parliament officially renamed Mukacheve (Мукачеве) into Mukachevo (Мукачево), a year after the city council had decided to rename the city. As it turned out, the name Mukacheve came into use in 1947 due to a mistake. According to press reports, the renaming of the city was initiated by its residents as part of the decommunization law, since the name Mukacheve appeared after the city joined the USSR. Previously, it was usually spelled as Мукачево (Mukachevo) by locals, and this name is typical for the Ukrainian language in forming city names, while Мукачів (Mukachiv) was sometimes also used. The city's name is portrayed on the city's coat of arms. The name of the city in other languages include:

- Russian: Мукачево (Mukachevo)
- Hungarian: Munkács
- Rusyn: Мукачово (Mukachovo)
- Belarusian: Мукачава (Mukačava)
- Romanian: Muncaci, Munceag
- Polish: Mukaczewo
- Slovak and Czech: Mukačevo
- German: Munkatsch
- Yiddish: מונקאַטש (Munkatsh, local pronunciation Minkatsh)

== History ==
=== Early history ===
Archaeological excavations suggest that early settlements existed here before the Middle Ages. For example, a Celtic oppidum and metal works center that existed in the 3rd-1st century BC were found between the Halish and Lovachka mountains. A Thracian fort of the Iron Age (10th century BC) was found on the mountain of Tupcha. Around the 1st century the area was occupied by the Carpi people who displaced the local Celts from the area. The Slavs settled the territory in the 6th century.

=== Hungarian rule ===
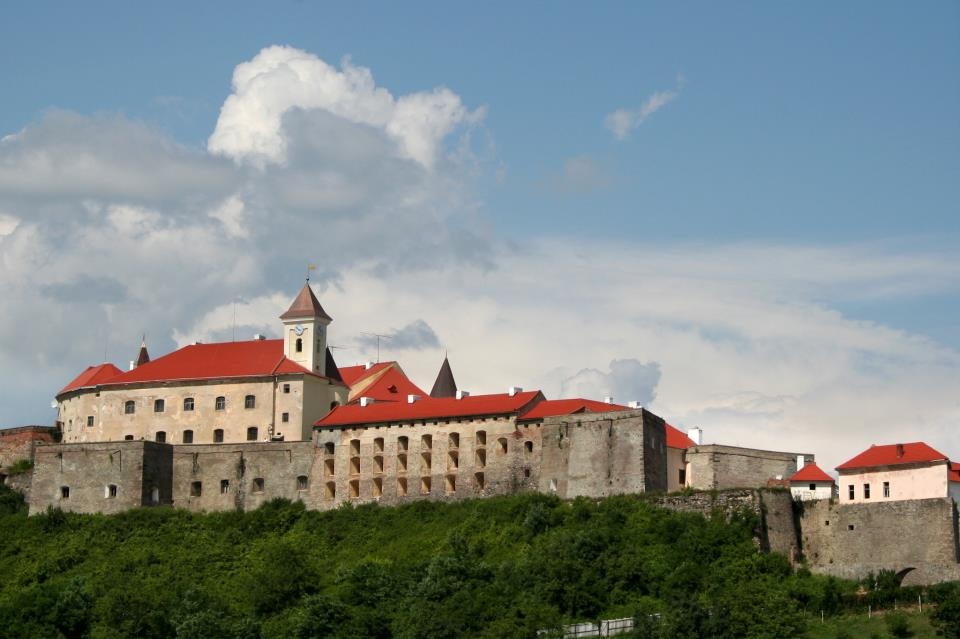

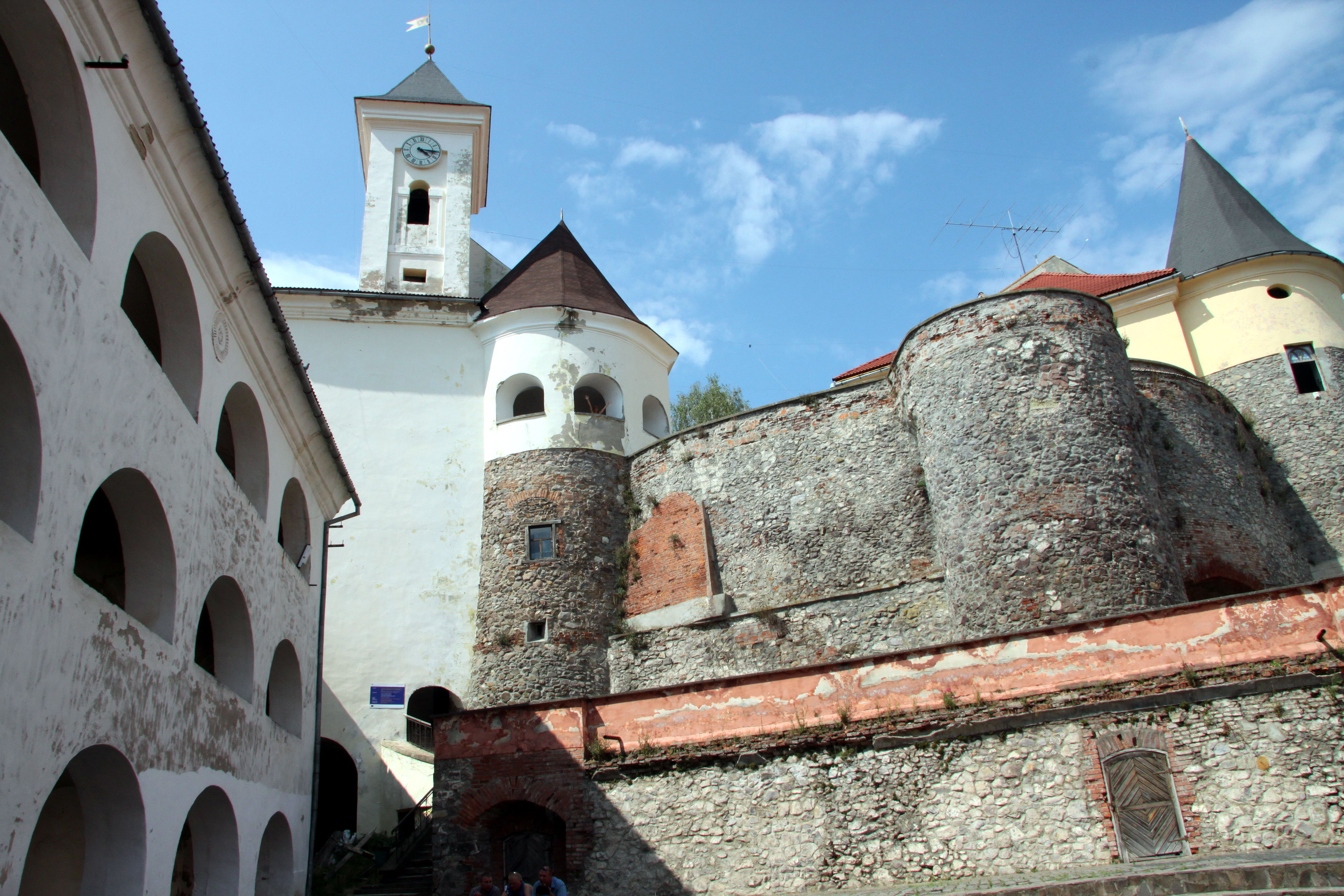
Palanok Castle in Mukachevo

In 895 the Hungarian tribes entered the Carpathian Basin through the Veretskyi Pass, about 60 km (37 mi) north of present-day Mukachevo. In 1397, the town and its surrounding was granted by Sigismund, Holy Roman Emperor, to his distant cousin, the exiled prince of Grand Duchy of Lithuania Fyodor Koriatovych, who used to administer the Ruthenian Podolia region of the Grand Duchy of Lithuania, until was exiled for disobedience by Grand Duke Vytautas the Great in 1392. Theodor therefore became a vassal of Hungary and settled many Ruthenians in the territory. Other sources, however, state that Theodor bought the town and the surrounding area in 1396. During the 15th century, the city prospered and became a prominent craft and trade center for the region. In 1445, the town became a Hungarian royal free city. It was also granted Magdeburg rights.

During the 16th century, Munkács became part of the Principality of Transylvania. The 17th century (from 1604 to 1711) was a time of continuous struggle against the expansionist intentions of the Habsburg Empire for the Principality. In 1678 the anti-Habsburg Revolt of Emeric Thököly started out from Munkács. The region also played an important role in Rákóczi's War of Independence.

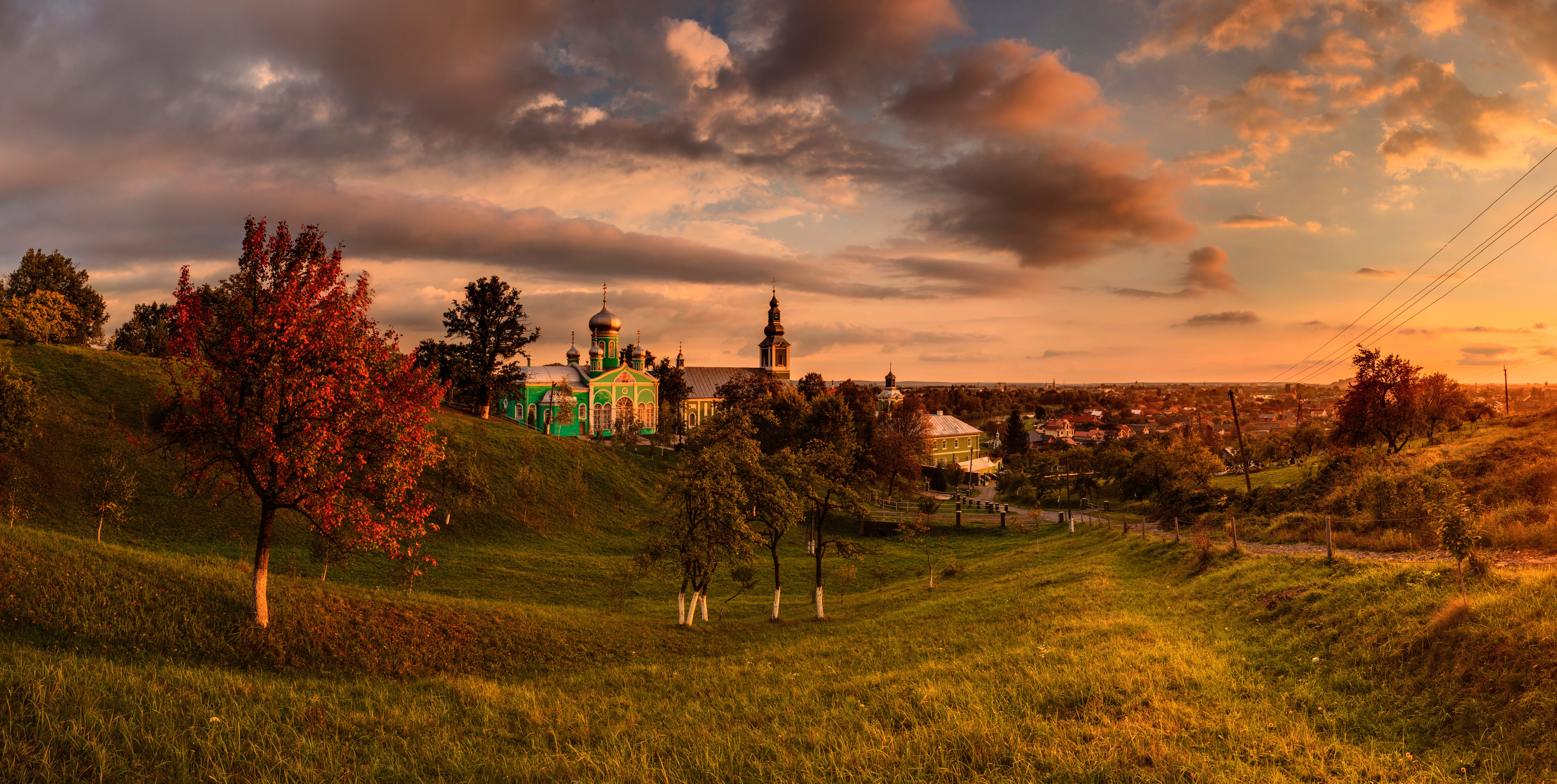
St Nicholas Monastery (1772-1806)

=== Austrian control and revolts ===
After the defeat of Francis II Rákóczi the city came under Austrian control in the mid-18th century as part of the Kingdom of Hungary and was made a key fortress of the Habsburg monarchy. In 1726, the Palanok Castle and the town, before 1711 owned by the Rákóczi family, was given by the Habsburgs to the Schönborn family, who were responsible for an expansion of the town. They also settled many Germans in the territory, thereby causing an economic boom of the region. During 1796–1897, the city's castle, until then a strong fortress, became a prison. The Greek national hero Alexander Ypsilanti was imprisoned at the Palanok Castle between 1821 and 1823.

=== Mukachevo during and after the wars ===
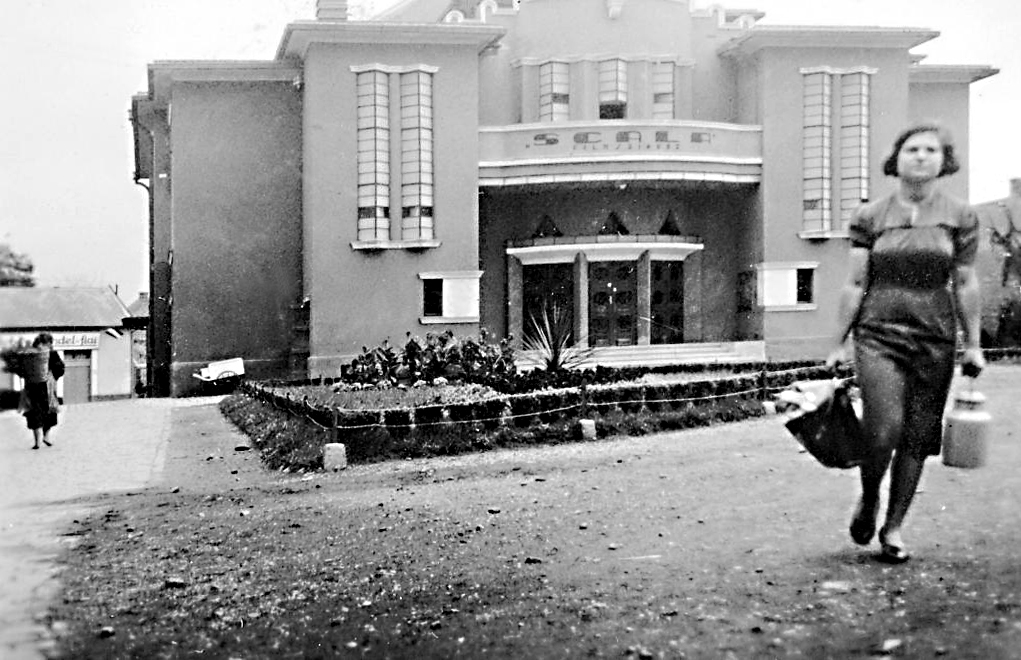
The Scala cinema in the centre of Mukachevo, 1942. Fortepan archive

In 1919, after the Rusyn Americans agreed with Tomáš Masaryk on the incorporation of Carpathian Ruthenia into Czechoslovakia, the whole of Carpathian Ruthenia was occupied by Czechoslovak troops. On 4 June 1920, Mukachevo officially became part of Czechoslovakia through the Treaty of Trianon. In November 1938, a part of the territory of the former Kingdom of Hungary was re-annexed by Hungary as part of the First Vienna Award.

Without delay the new authorities decreed the expulsion of all Jews without Hungarian citizenship. As a consequence, Polish and Russian Jews, long-term residents of the now Hungarian-controlled Transcarpathian region, and also from Mukachevo, as well as the native Jews who could not prove their citizenship, were deported over the Ukrainian border where they were turned over to the German Einsatzgruppe commando led by Friedrich Jeckeln. On 27 and 28 August 1941, they were all murdered by the Germans in Kamianets-Podilskyi's massacre. Even so, Mukachevo's population still held an important Jewish component, up until 1944 when all remaining Jews were deported to the Auschwitz concentration camp by Adolf Eichmann.

At the end of 1944, the Red Army stormed Carpathian Ruthenia. At first the territory was given to the re-established Czechoslovakia, which then became part of the Soviet Union later in 1945 by a treaty between the two countries. The Soviet Union began a policy of expulsion of the Hungarian population. In 1945, the city was ceded to the Ukrainian Soviet Socialist Republic, and is currently under the sovereignty of Ukraine. Since 2002, Mukachevo has been the seat of the Roman Catholic Diocese of Mukachevo. The 128th Mountain Assault Brigade of the Ukrainian Ground Forces has been based in Mukachevo since World War II.

=== Post–Ukrainian independence ===
==== 2015 far-right clash with Ukraine's special security service ====
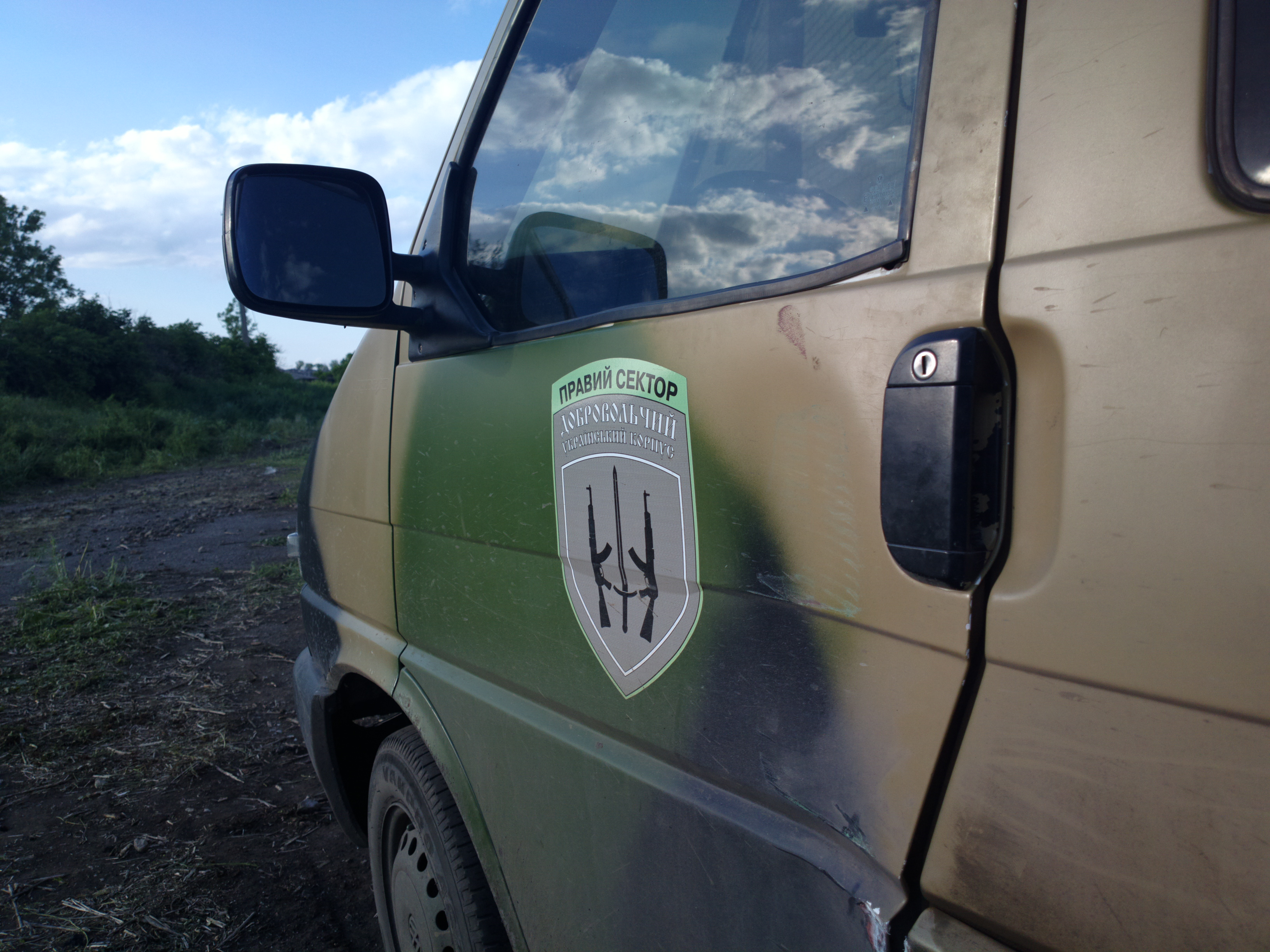
Vehicle with a DUK insignia, 2015

On 10 July 2015, Ukrainian government forces clashed with far-right Right Sector paramilitary forces, killing two people. According to President of Ukraine Petro Poroshenko's ally Yuriy Lutsenko, these events "result[ed from] the conflict of interests between illegal armed groups and a mafia overtly cooperating with law enforcers." Some local leaders indicated the conflict ensued when Right Sector forces attempted to clamp down on the lucrative illegal cigarette smuggling trade to Western Europe, in which local law enforcement had been complicit. Immediate fallout from the events included the sacking of the leadership of the local Zakarpatya district customs service. Ukrainian MP Mykhailo Lanyo, fingered in the smuggling ring, reportedly fled Ukraine. Right Sector leader Yarosh called for calm, and denied that Right Sector troops were being withdrawn from eastern Ukraine.

== Geography ==
=== Climate ===
Mukachevo has a humid continental climate (Köppen: Dfb).

Climate data for Mukachevo
Month	Jan	Feb	Mar	Apr	May	Jun	Jul	Aug	Sep	Oct	Nov	Dec	Year
Daily mean °C (°F)	−2.7 (27.1)	−0.5 (31.1)	4.5 (40.1)	10.5 (50.9)	15.3 (59.5)	18.2 (64.8)	20.0 (68.0)	19.4 (66.9)	15.5 (59.9)	10.2 (50.4)	4.7 (40.5)	0.1 (32.2)	9.6 (49.3)
Average precipitation mm (inches)	46 (1.8)	39 (1.5)	40 (1.6)	47 (1.9)	70 (2.8)	87 (3.4)	78 (3.1)	70 (2.8)	50 (2.0)	46 (1.8)	51 (2.0)	59 (2.3)	683 (27)
Source: Climate-Data.org

== Demographics ==
In 1910, the Hungarian Statistical Report recorded 17,275 inhabitants in Mukachevo. Of those, 12,686 persons, (73.44%) declared themselves Hungarian, 3078 (17.82%), German, and 1394 (8.07%) Rusyn. In terms of religious affiliations, 7675 persons (44.43%) were Israelites/Jewish, 4081 persons (23.62%) were Greek-Catholic, 3526 persons (20.41%) were Roman-Catholic, 1771 persons (10.25%) were Reformed Protestants /Calvinists and 190 persons (1.1%) were Evangelical Protestants/Lutherans.

In 1921, 21,000 people lived in Mukachevo. Of these, 48% were Jewish, 24% were Rusyn, and 22% were Hungarian.

In 1966, 50,500 people lived in Mukachevo. Of these, 60% were Ukrainian, 18% were Hungarian, 10% were Russian, and 6% were Jewish.

According to the 2001 census, 82,200 people live in Mukachevo. The population in 1989 was 91,000, in 2004, 77,300 and in 2008, 93,738. Its population includes:

Ethnic groups in Mukachevo
	percent
Ukrainians	77.1%
Russians	9.0%
Hungarians	8.5%
Germans	2.0%
Roma	1.4%
Jews	1.1%

Residents in seven villages of the Mukachevo Raion have the option to learn the Hungarian language in a school or home school environment.

== Economy ==
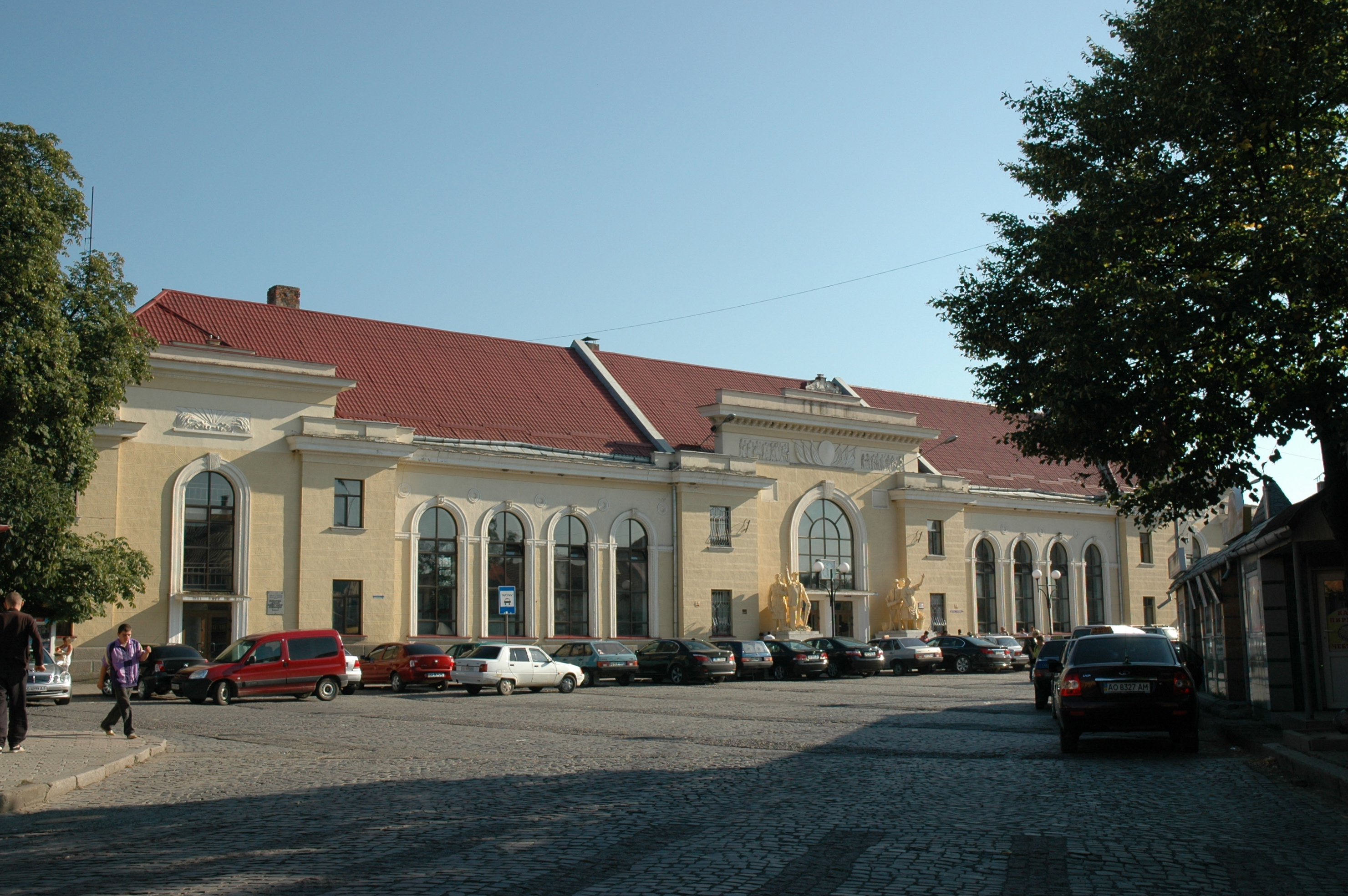
Railway station

- Mukachevo (air base)
- Mukachevo Radar Station
- Mukacheve-Kapusany Line, 400kV
- 400 kV substation

Fischer Sports, an Austrian company that produces Nordic skiing, Alpine skiing, and ice hockey equipment, has a factory in Mukachevo. The firm benefits from provisional application on January 1, 2016 of the Deep and Comprehensive Free Trade Area provisions of the European Union–Ukraine Association Agreement.

== Jewish community ==
There are documents in the Berehove (Beregszász) State Archives which indicate that Ashkenazi Jews lived in Munkács and the surrounding villages as early as the second half of the seventeenth century. The Jewish community of Munkács was an amalgam of Galician and Hungarian Hasidic Jewry, Orthodox Jews, and Zionists. The town is most noted for its Chief Rabbi Chaim Elazar Spira who led the community until his death in 1937.

By 1851, Munkács supported a large yeshiva, thereby demonstrating the community's commitment to Talmudic learning and piety.

Materially impoverished, yet wealthy in ideological debate, the Jews of interwar Munkács constituted almost half of the town's population. The Munkács Jewish community was famous for its Hasidic activity as well as its innovations in Zionism and modern Jewish education.

The Jewish population of Munkács grew from 2,131 in 1825 to 5049 in 1891 (almost 50 percent of the total population) to 7675 in 1910 (about 44 percent). By 1921, the 10,000 Jews still made up about half the residents, though by 1930, the proportion had dropped to 43 percent, with a little over 11,000 Jews. The Jews of Munkács constituted 11 percent of the Jewry of Subcarpathian Rus'.

Interwar Munkács had a very large Jewish population, which was most visible on Shabbat. On that day most stores were closed and, after services, the streets filled with Hasidic Jews in their traditional garb. The first movie house in the town was established by a Hasidic Jew, and it too closed on the Shabbat and Jewish holidays.

The Chief Rabbi of Munkács, Chaim Elazar Spira (who led the community from 1913 until his death in 1937) was the most outspoken voice of religious anti-Zionism. He had succeeded his father, Rabbi Zvi Hirsh Spira, who had earlier inherited the mantle of leadership from his father Rabbi Shlomo Spira. He was also a Hasidic rebbe with a significant number of followers. Rabbi Chaim Elazar Spira was succeeded by his son-in-law, Rabbi Baruch Yehoshua Yerachmiel Rabinowicz.

Along with the dominant Munkácser Hasidic community there co-existed smaller yet vibrant Hasidic groups who were followers of the rebbes Belz, of Spinka, Zidichov, and Vizhnitz. By the time of the Holocaust there were nearly 30 synagogues in town, many of which were shtibelekh ("[small] house" - small [Hasidic] synagogues).

The Hebrew Gymnasium (high school) was founded in Munkács five years after the first Hebrew speaking elementary school in Czechoslovakia was established there in 1920. It soon became the most prestigious Hebrew high school east of Warsaw. Zionist activism along with Hasidic pietism contributed to a community percolating with excitement, intrigue and at times internecine conflict.

Latorica

In 1935, Chaim Kugel, formerly director of the Munkács gymnasium (Jewish high school) and then Jewish Party delegate to the Czechoslovak Parliament, gave a speech during a parliamentary debate: "…It is completely impossible to adequately describe the poverty in the area. The Jews… are affected equally along with the rest…. I strongly wish to protest any attempt to blame the poverty of the Subcarpathian Ruthenian peasantry on the Jews" (Kugel later got to Mandatory Palestine and eventually became mayor of the Israeli city of Holon).

Government policies were covertly directed against Jews, who bore a heavy share of taxes and had difficulty getting high civil service positions.

In 1939, the Hungarians seized and annexed Subcarpathian Rus—including Munkács—taking advantage of the dismemberment of Czechoslovakia. Though antisemitic legislation was introduced by the Hungarian authorities, Subcarpathian Rus, like the rest of Hungary, remained a relative haven for Jews until Nazi Germany occupied Hungary in 1944.

In the spring of 1944 there were nearly 15,000 Jewish residents of the town. This ended on May 30, 1944, when the city was pronounced Judenrein (free of Jews after ghettoization and a series of deportations to Auschwitz).

Today, Mukachevo is experiencing a Jewish renaissance of sorts with the establishment of a supervised kosher kitchen, a mikveh, Jewish summer camp in addition to the prayer services which take place three times daily. In July 2006, a new synagogue was dedicated on the site of a pre-war Hasidic synagogue.

== Architectural landmarks ==
- Palanok Castle, 14th century. The castle of Munkács played an important role during the anti-Habsburg revolts in this territory and present-day Slovakia (1604–1711), especially at the beginning of the anti-Habsburg Revolt of Imre Thököly (1685–1688), as well as at the beginning of the revolt of Ferenc II. Rákóczi (early 18th century). This important fortress became a prison from the end of the 18th century and was used until 1897. The Greek national hero Alexander Ypsilanti was imprisoned in Munkács castle from 1821 to 1823.
- Saint Nicholas Monastery
- Wooden church built in the Ukrainian architectural style, 18th century

== Sport ==
The main soccer team is MFA Mukachevo, which play in Ukrainian Second League.

== Notable people ==
- Lojza Baránek
- Samuel Gottesman
- Ihor Kharatin
- Fyodor Koriatovych
- Lolita Milyavskaya
- Ivan Mozer
- Rio Preisner
- Baruch Yehoshua Yerachmiel Rabinowicz
- Moshe Leib Rabinovich
- Ludvík Ráža
- Chaim Elazar Spira
- Tzvi Elimelech Spira of Dinov
- Ján Strausz
- Svyatoslav Vakarchuk
- Yitzchok Yaakov Weiss
- Joseph Meir Weiss
- Yuri Yukechev
- Naomi Blake
- Ilona Zrinyi

== Twin towns – sister cities ==
Mukachevo is twinned with:

- Celldömölk, Hungary
- Dabas, Hungary
- Eger, Hungary
- Humenné, Slovakia
- Kisvárda, Hungary
- Mátészalka, Hungary
- Nyírmeggyes, Hungary
- Mielec, Poland
- Pag, Croatia
- Pelhřimov, Czech Republic
- Prešov, Slovakia
- Senta, Serbia
- Várkerület (Budapest), Hungary

== Gallery ==
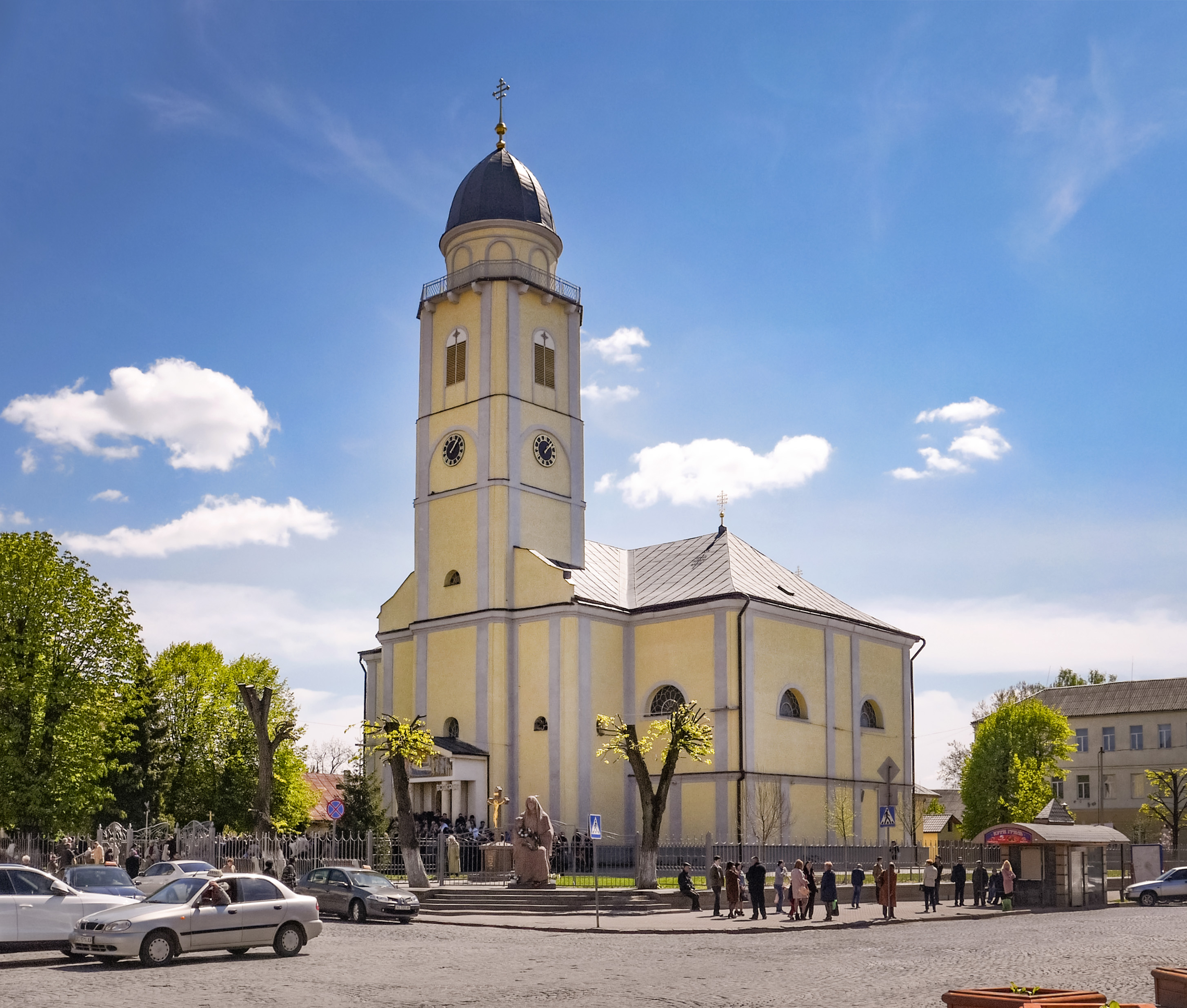
Dormition Cathedral

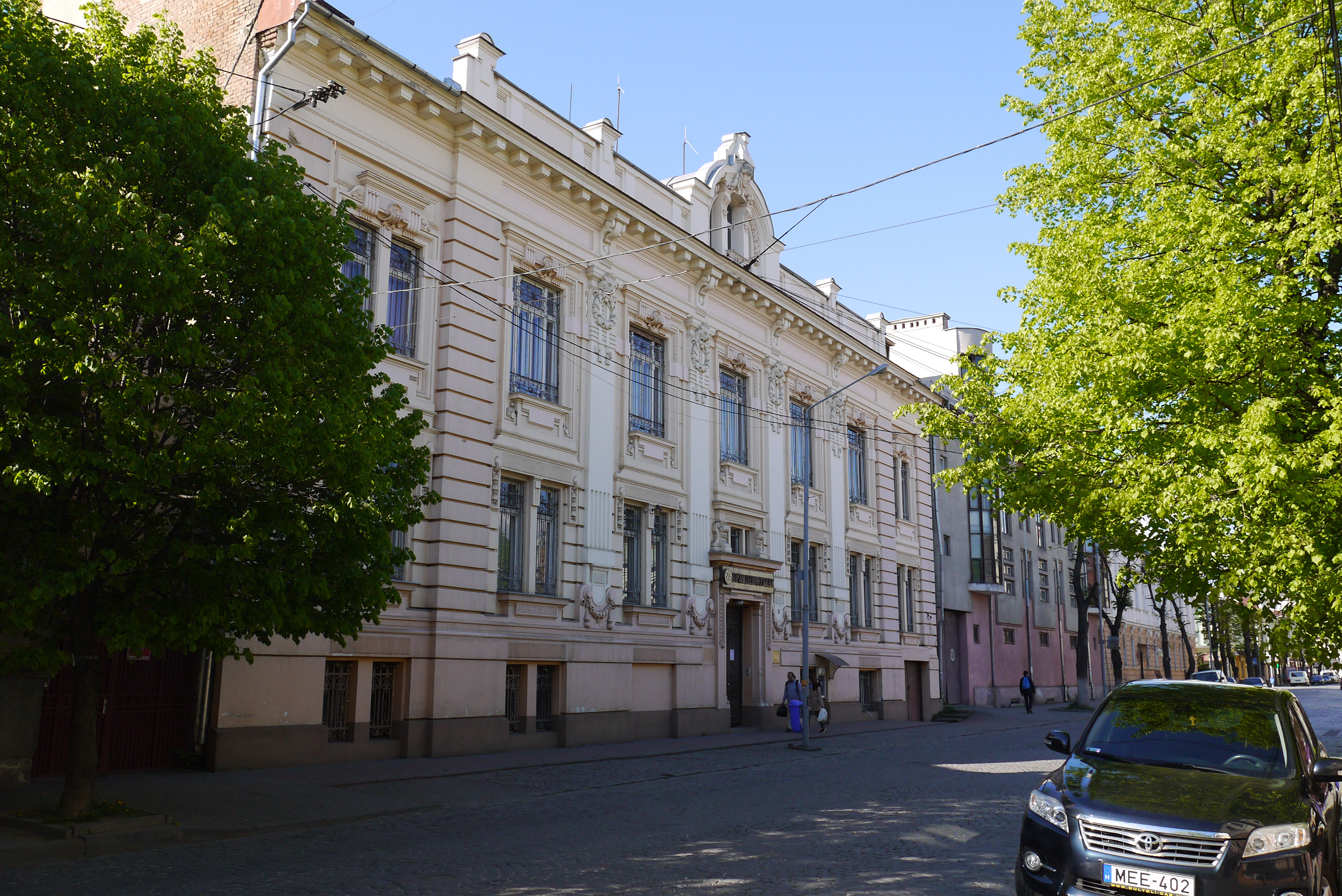
A historical building on Yaroslava Mudroho Street

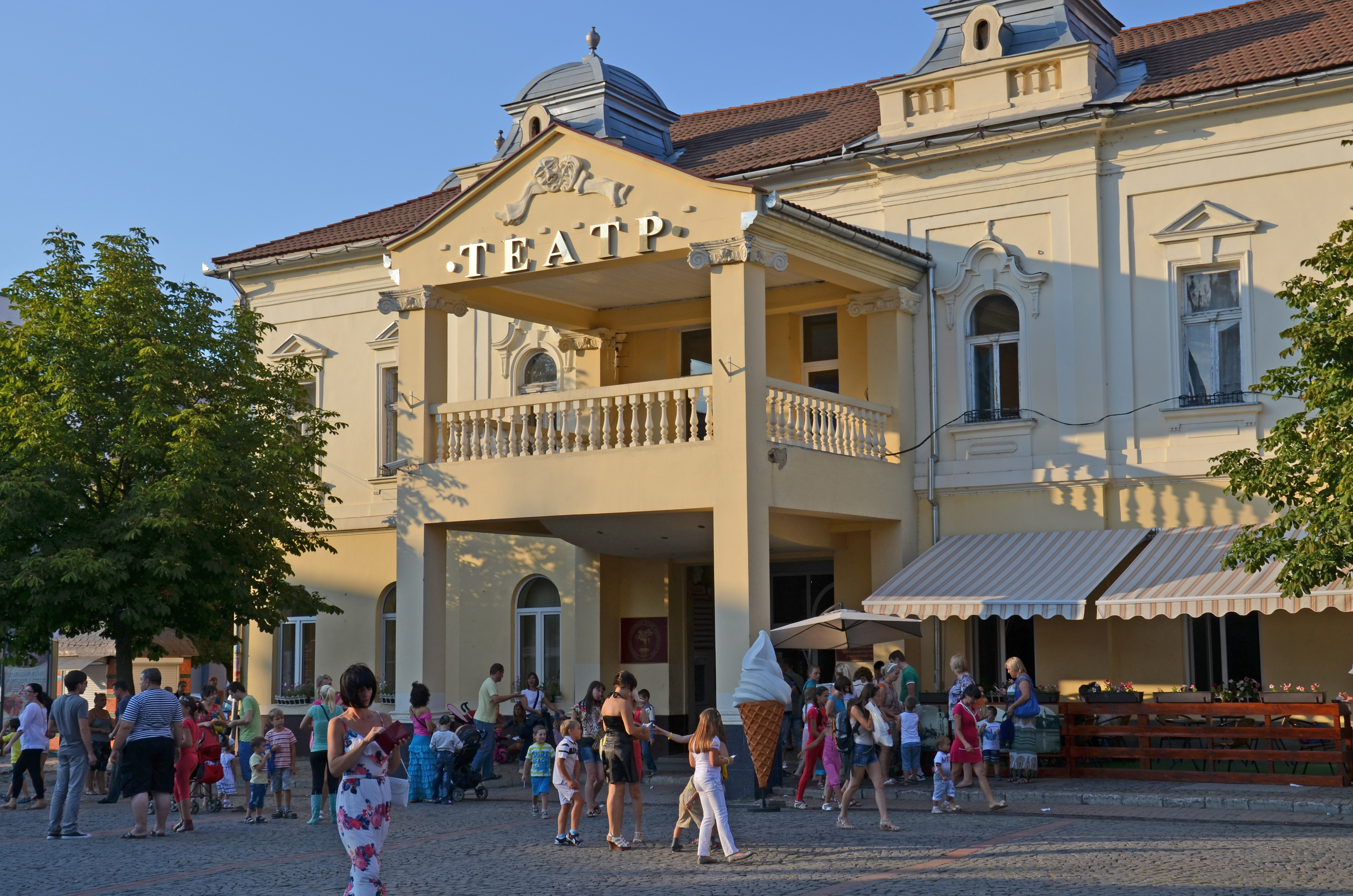
Mukachevo drama theater

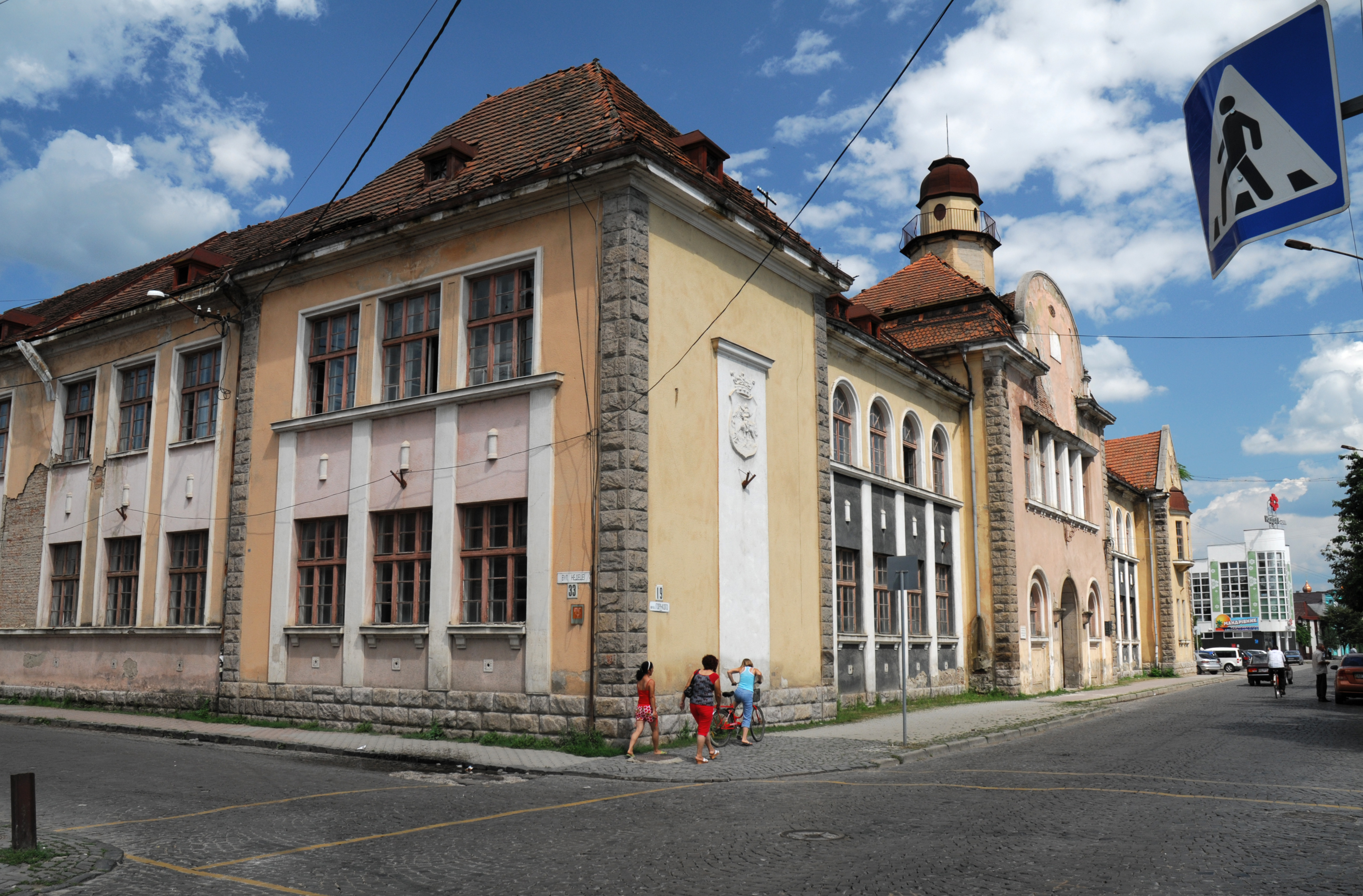
Palace of Culture and Arts (Old Trade Academy Munkacs)

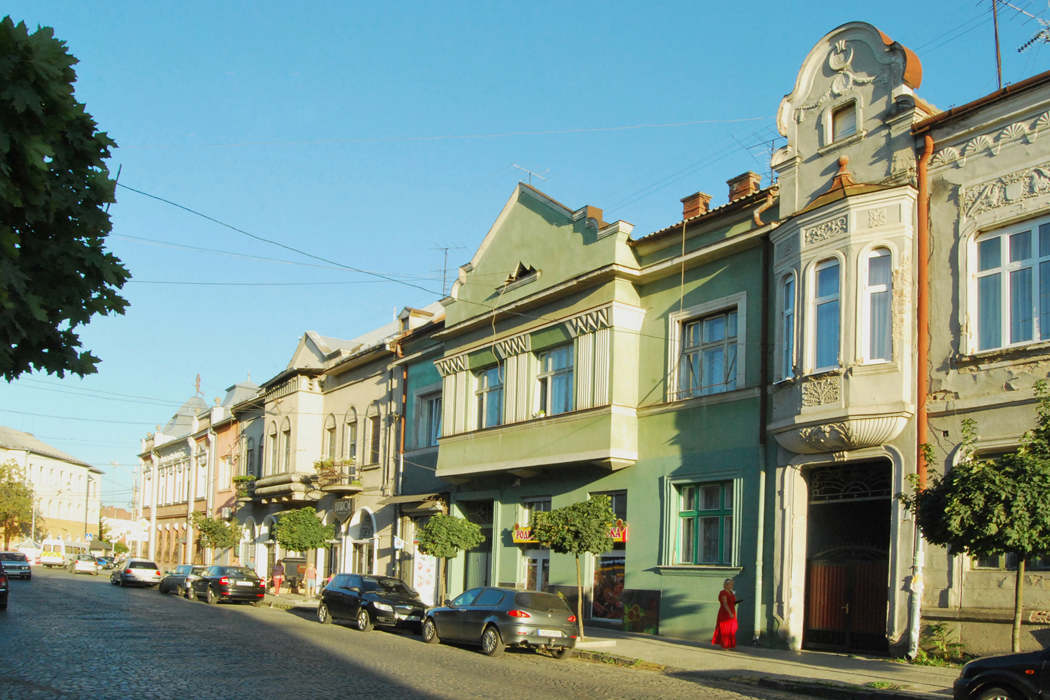
A street in the old town (Ilona Zrínyi Street)

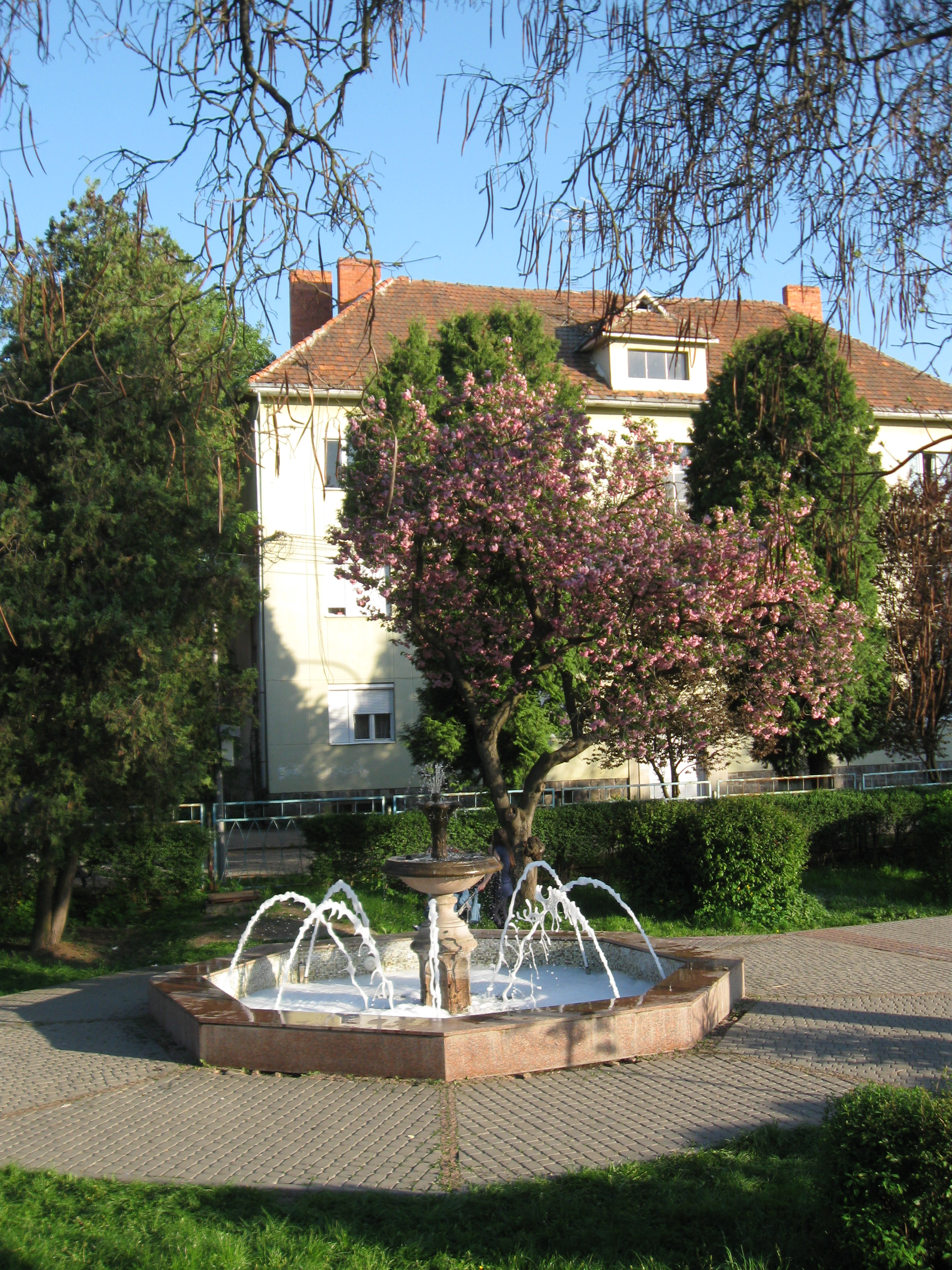
Andriy Kuzmenko Park in Mukachevo

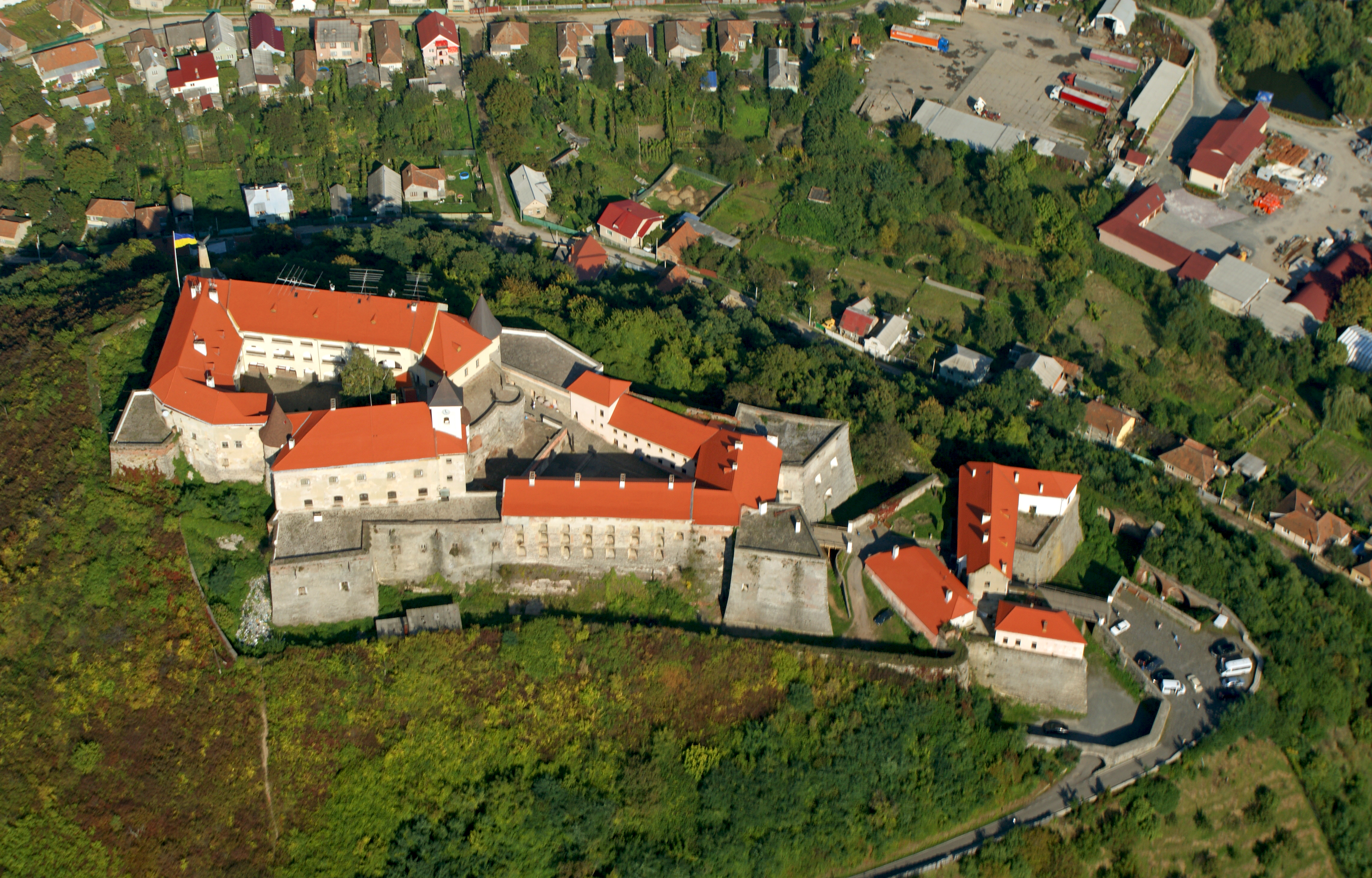
Aerial view of Palanok Castle

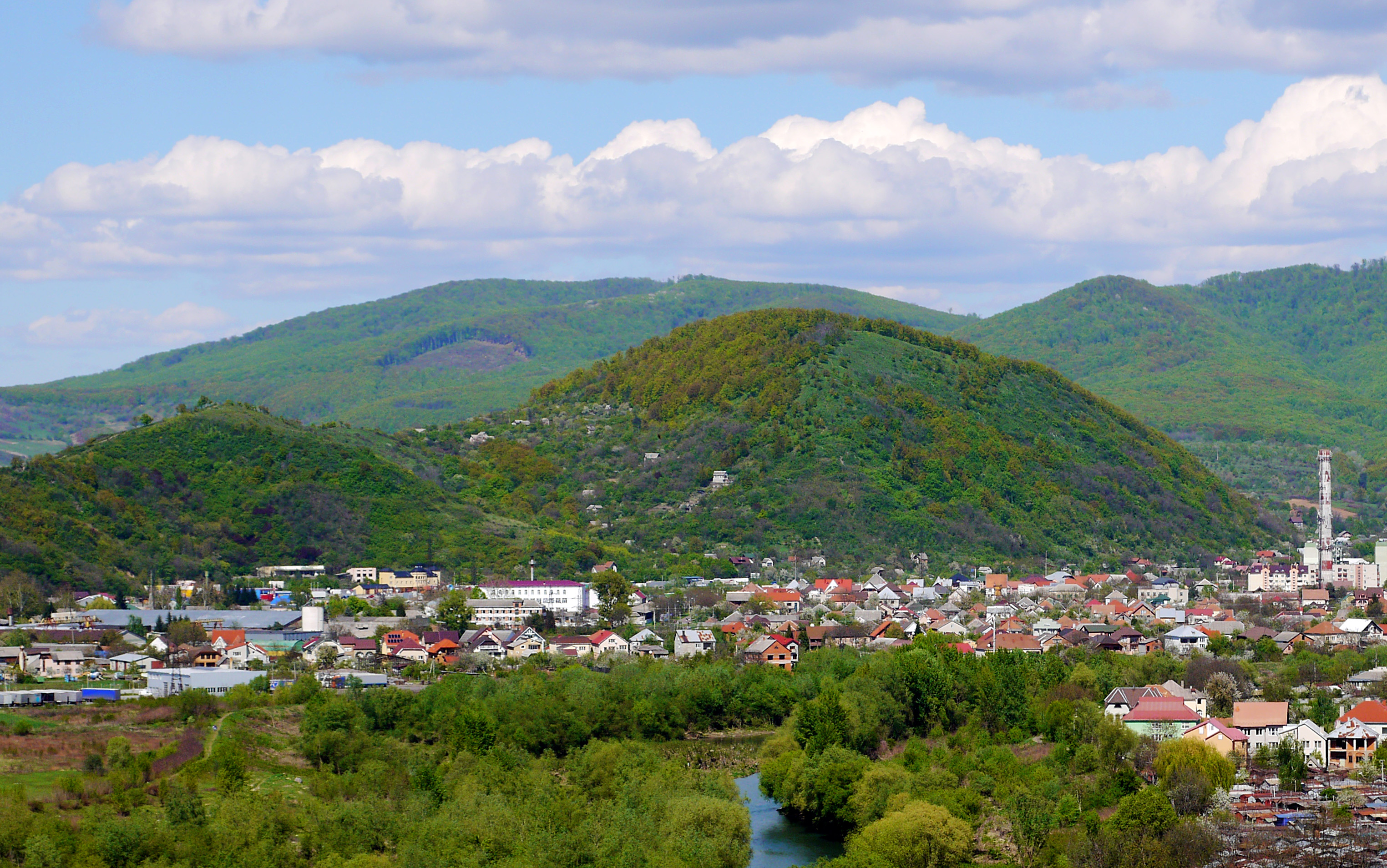
Northern outskirts of Mukachevo, Halish and Lovachka mountains

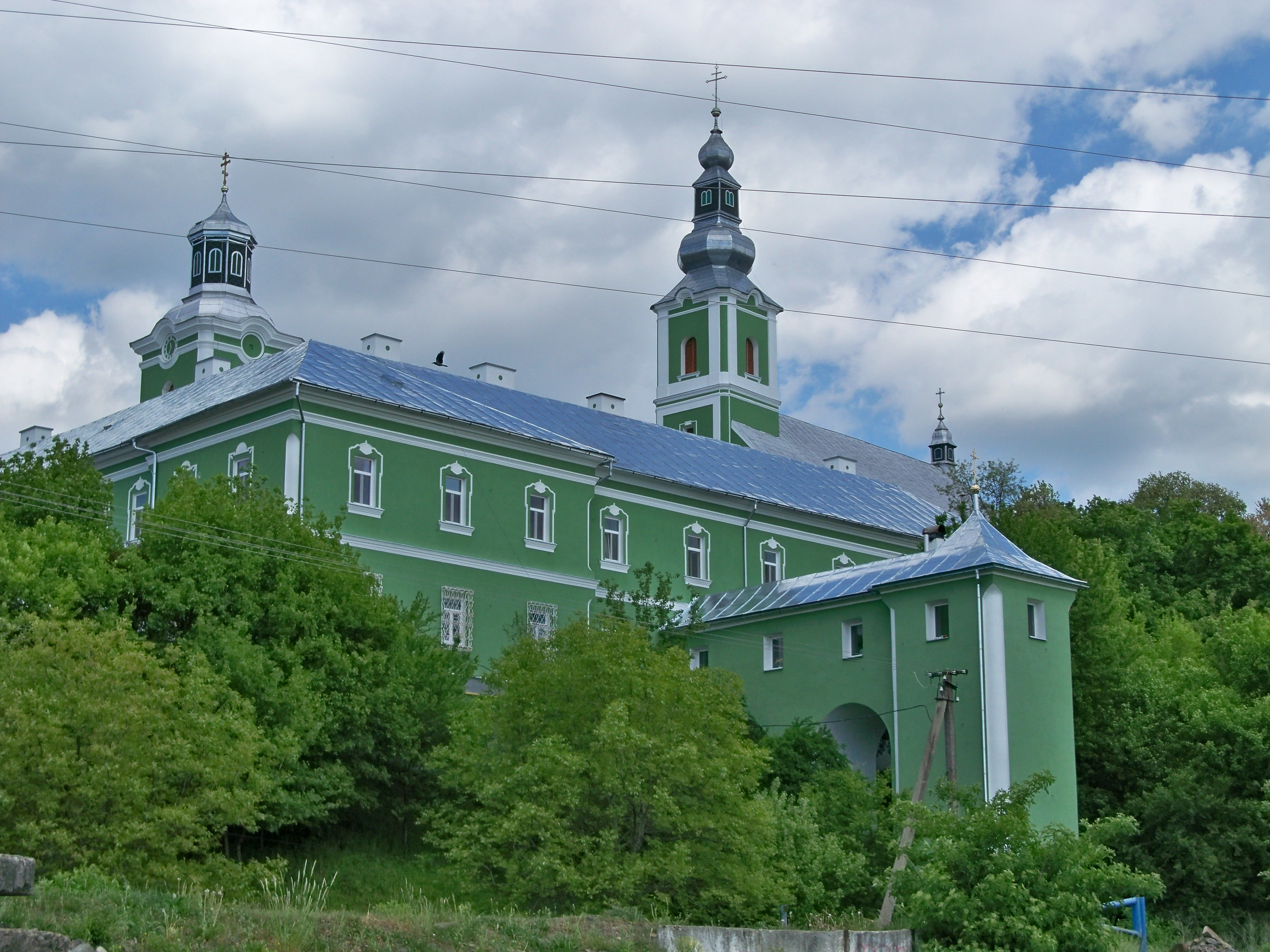
A church in Mukachevo

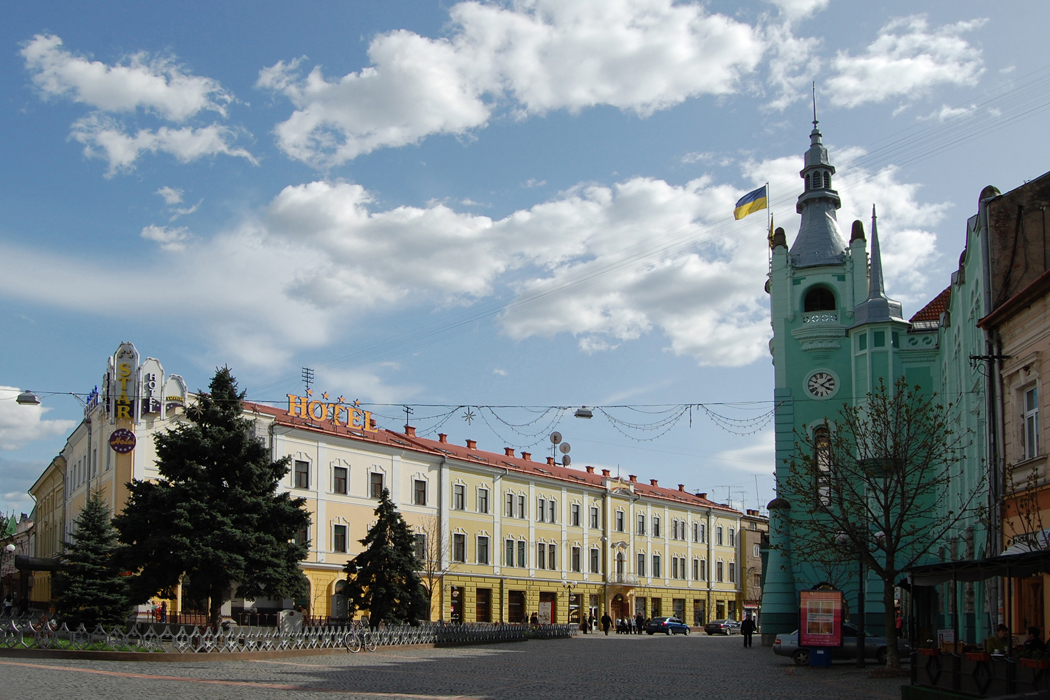
Central square of Mukachevo

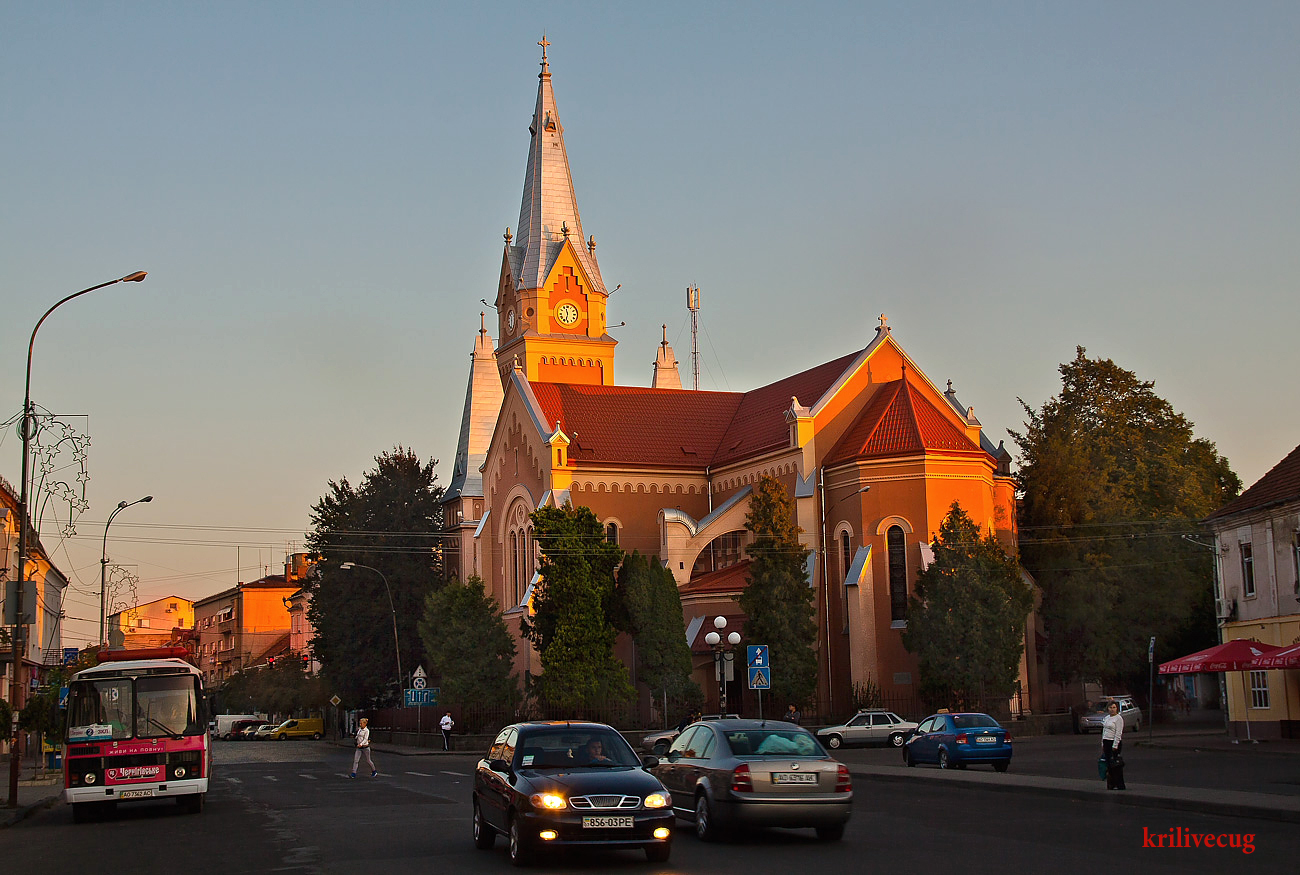
Roman Catholic cathedral

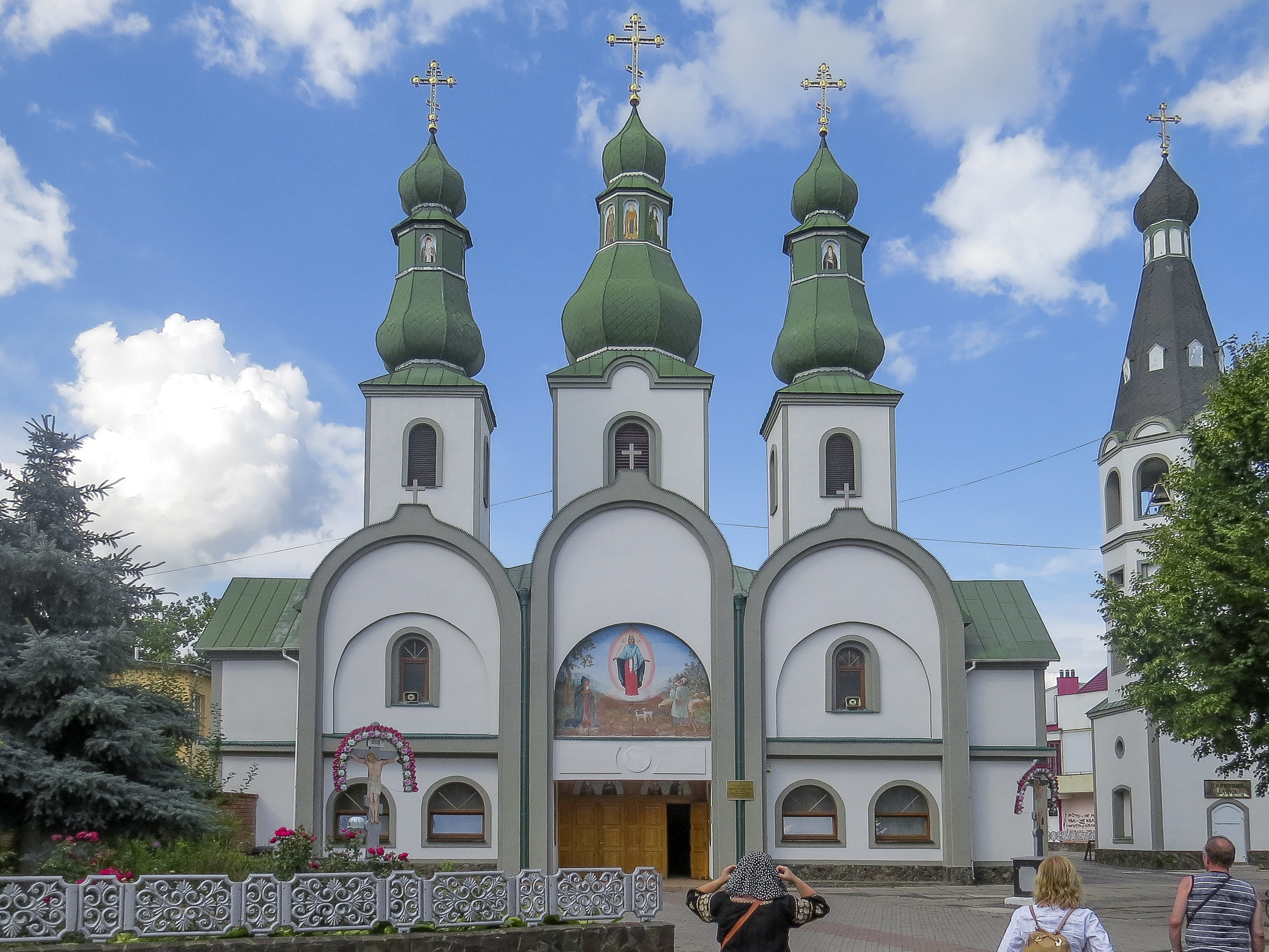
Orthodox Church of Pochaiv Icon of Virgin Mary

== See also ==
- Zakarpattia Oblast
- Eparchy of Mukachevo and Prešov
- Saint Nicholas Monastery (Mukachevo)
- Byzantine Catholic Eparchy of Mukachevo
- Roman Catholic Diocese of Mukachevo
