= Poteč =

- Municipality
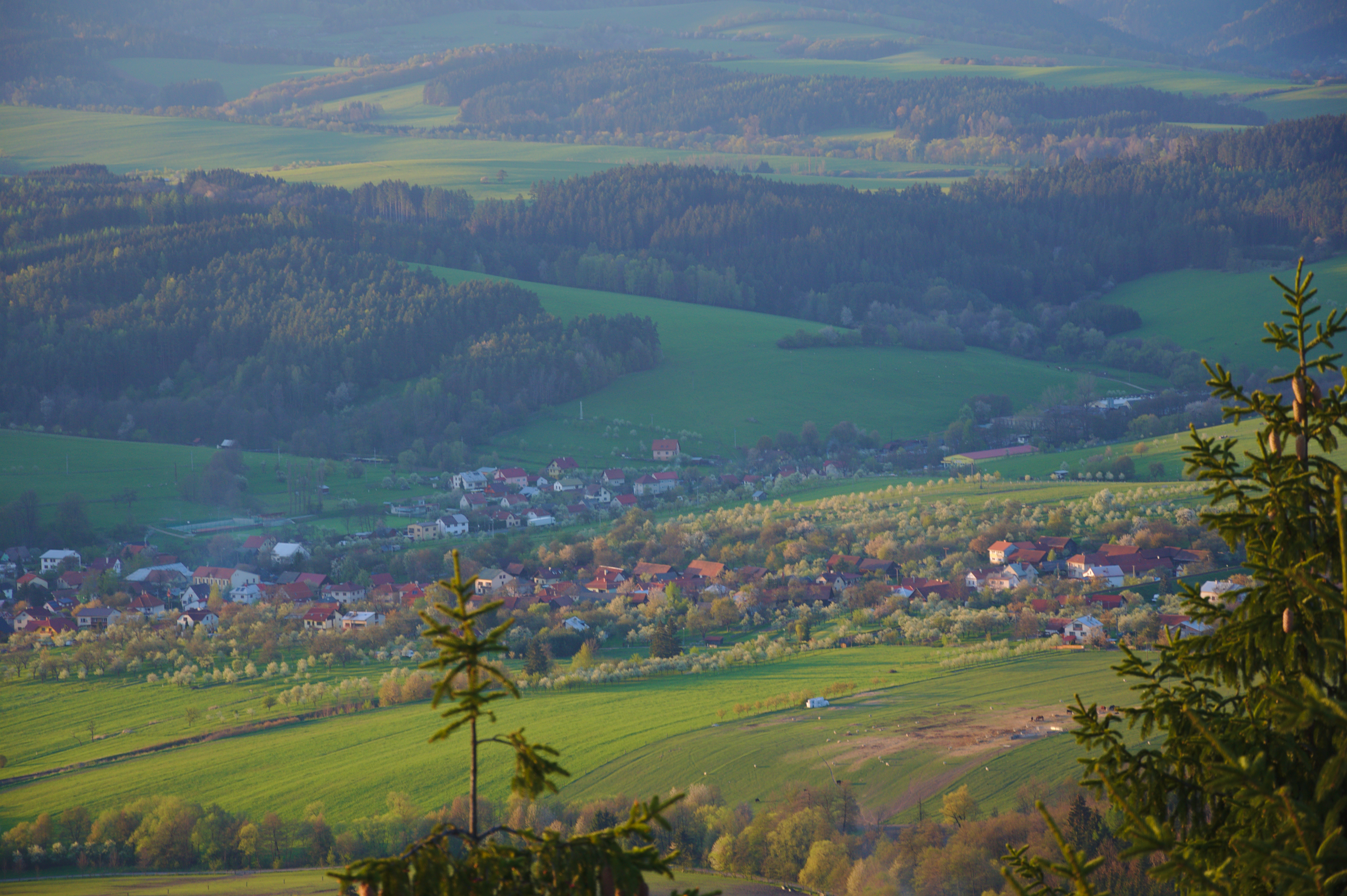
- View from the south

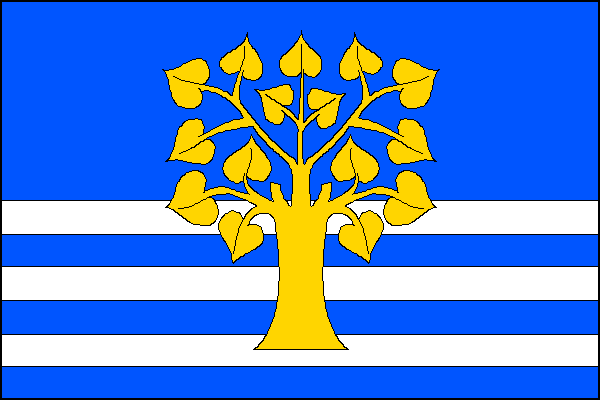
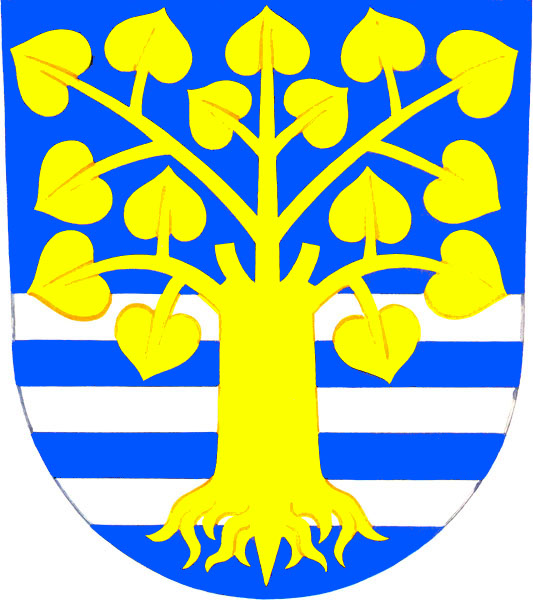
- Flag Coat of arms

- Location in the Czech Republic
- Coordinates: 49°9′16″N 18°2′8″E
- Country: Czech Republic
- Region: Zlín
- District: Zlín
- First mentioned: 1341

Area
  - Total: 10.57 km^{2} (4.08 sq mi)
- Elevation: 430 m (1,410 ft)

Population (2026-01-01)
  - Total: 746
  - Density: 70.6/km^{2} (183/sq mi)
- Time zone: UTC+1 (CET)
  - Summer (DST): UTC+2 (CEST)
- Postal code: 766 01
- Website: www.potec.cz

Poteč is a municipality and village in Zlín District in the Zlín Region of the Czech Republic. It has about 700 inhabitants.

Poteč lies approximately 29 kilometres (18 mi) east of Zlín and 282 km (175 mi) east of Prague.

== Demographics ==
Historical population
Year	Pop.	±%
1869	633	—
1880	635	+0.3%
1890	624	−1.7%
1900	688	+10.3%
1910	616	−10.5%
1921	666	+8.1%
1930	716	+7.5%
1950	666	−7.0%
1961	791	+18.8%
1970	755	−4.6%
1980	708	−6.2%
1991	731	+3.2%
2001	764	+4.5%
2011	751	−1.7%
2021	708	−5.7%
Source: Censuses

== Notable people ==
- Lojza Baránek (1932–2016), painter; lived and died here
