= Yaakov Yehuda Aryeh Leib Frenkel =

Rabbi Yaakov Yehuda Aryeh Leib Frenkel
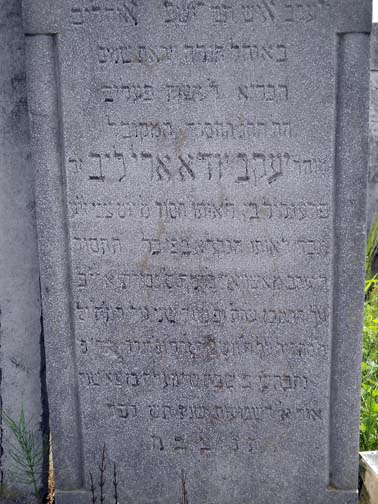
- Rabbi Frenkel's Tombstone in Satu Mare

Personal life
- Died: June 12, 1940 Satu Mare, Kingdom of Romania
- Buried: Satu Mare, Romania
- Parent(s): Rabbi Yom Tov Tzvi Frenkel

Religious life
- Religion: Judaism
- Denomination: Orthodox
- Main work: Gevuras Aryeh

Rabbi Yaakov Yehuda Aryeh Leib Frenkel יעקב יהודה אריה ליב פרענקיל (died June 12, 1940) also known as the Gevuras Aryeh after his major work, was Rabbi of Piricse and a renowned Kabbalist. He authored many scholarly works.

Rabbi Frenkel's year of birth is variously cited as 1850 or 1855. His father was Rabbi Yom Tov Tzvi. Rabbi Yom Tov Tzvi was the son of Rabbi Yaakov from the town of Oshvar.

In his youth, Rabbi Frenkel was a disciple of Rabbi Yekusiel Yehuda Teitelbaum (1808–1883), who was known as the Yetev Lev. When Rabbi Frenkel matured and needed to earn a livelihood, he assumed a teaching position in Spinka, upon the recommendation of Rabbi Teitelbaum. In Spinka, Rabbi Frenkel became the study partner of Rabbi Yoseph Meir Weiss.

Subsequently, Rabbi Frenkel was appointed to serve as the town Rabbi of Piricse, Hungary, a position that he held for over fifty years.

When Rabbi Frenkel retired, he moved to Satmar (Satu Mare) in Romania, where he was regarded as a rabbinical authority.

== Works ==
Although Rabbi Frenkel authored numerous works due to financial difficulties, only five books were ever published. The rest of his manuscripts were destroyed in the Holocaust.

- In 1909 Rabbi Frenkel anonymously published his book entitled Maggid Sheni מגיד שני על המשנת חסידים - a kabbalistic work on the second volume of the Mishnas Chassidim. The book was republished during the author's lifetime in 1930. Since then the book has been republished numerous times.
- In 1915 Rabbi Frenkel published the first volume of his work entitled Gevuras Aryeh גבורת אריה - a kabbalistic work on the Ramban's commentary on the Torah. The second volume was published in 1924. Both volumes were then reprinted as a single book in 1932. The book was reprinted again in 1990 by "Machon Sharei Ziv" of "Yeshiva Shar HaShamayim", a kabbalah yeshiva in Jerusalem, where the book is studied regularly.
- In 1927 Rabbi Frenkel published his book dedicated to Hilchos Treifos entitled Migdinos Maharil מגדנות מהרי"ל. The book was printed in Șimleu Silvaniei. In the book, Rabbi Frenkel writes that the large book is actually only the first part of his manuscripts on the subject. Rabbi Frenkel explained that he could not publish the rest of his manuscripts at that time, due to financial reasons; furthermore, he expressed his desire to publish the rest of his work in the future (as he had done previously with his book entitled Gevuras Aryeh). Rabbi Frenkel's dream never materialized and the manuscripts were destroyed during the Holocaust.
- The exact date of publication of Rabbi Frenkel's book, entitled Shevach Lefi - שבח לפי a commentary on the Haggadah Shel Pesach, is undocumented. However, since the author, in his introduction to the book, refers to his 1927 book, entitled Migdinos Maharil, and since the 1930 edition of Maggid Sheni refers to "Shevach Lefi", we can deduce that it must have been published between 1927 and 1930. The book was republished by Rabbi Dr. Ari Edelstein, a grandson of Rabbi Frenkel, in 1994 in New York City.
- In 1937, only three years prior to his death, Rabbi Frenkel published his final work, entitled Likutei Maharil ליקוטי מהרי"ל - a commentary on the Torah.
