= Lojza Baránek =

Czech painter (1932–2016)

Alois Baránek
- Born: 6 February 1932; Mukačevo, Czechoslovakia
- Died: 30 December 2016 (aged 84); Poteč, Czech Republic
- Citizenship: Czechoslovak
- Education: Academy of Performing Arts in Bratislava
- Occupations: Painter, teacher

Alois "Lojza" Baránek (6 February 1932 – 30 December 2016) was a Czech painter.

== Life and career ==
Baránek was born on 6 February 1932 in Mukačevo, Czechoslovakia (now Mukachevo, Ukraine). From early childhood until the end of his life, he lived in the village of Poteč. From 1951 to 1957, he studied at the Academy of Performing Arts in Bratislava under professor Ladislav Vychodil. After graduation, he joined the Army as an artist in the theater in Martin, and later worked at the theatre in Nitra.

Since 1934, with the exception of periods of study in the Slovak Republic, he has lived permanently in Valašské Klobouky. He founded an art course at the local music school in September 1965. His artistic work is devoted to painting, graphic art, decorative pottery and implementations of the architecture. He has exhibited in Valašské Klobouky, Bratislava, Brno, Luhačovice, Zlín, Vsetín, Vizovice, Slavičín and Rožnov pod Radhoštěm.

In September 2010, he created a ceramic plaque of Gabra and Málinka, fictional characters from the books by Amálie Kutinová.

Lojza Baránek died after a short illness in Poteč on 30 December 2016, aged 85.
