= Piricse =

Coordinates: 47°46′N 22°09′E

- Coat of arms
- Interactive map of Piricse
- Country: Hungary
- County: Szabolcs-Szatmár-Bereg

Area
  - Total: 36.99 km^{2} (14.28 sq mi)

Population (2001)
  - Total: 1,871
  - Density: 50.58/km^{2} (131.0/sq mi)
- Time zone: UTC+1 (CET)
  - Summer (DST): UTC+2 (CEST)
- Postal code: 4375
- Area code: 42

Location of Szabolcs-Szatmar-Bereg county in Hungary

Piricse is a village in Szabolcs-Szatmár-Bereg county, in the Northern Great Plain region of eastern Hungary.

== Geography ==
It covers an area of 36.99 km^{2} (14 sq mi)

== Population ==
Of the town's population of 1,835 people (2001) 94.5% identified themselves as Hungarian and 5.5% as Gypsy.

== Notable people ==
- Michael Fedics (1851–1938), the great storytellers.
- Rabbi Yaakov Yehuda Aryeh Leib Frenkel(died 1940) - the Town Rabbi
- Irene Wild recognized jazz singer. The Budapest Jazz Garden Club 's founder.

== Jewish community ==
- Prior to the Holocaust a small Jewish community existed in Piricse.
- The Jewish population in 1880 was 171 and declined to 73 by 1930.
