= Joseph Meir Weiss =

Joseph Meir Weiss (March 15, 1838 – May 26, 1909, Hebrew: יוסף מאיר ווייס), was a Hungarian rabbi and founder of the Spinka Hasidic dynasty. He is often known as the "Imrei Yosef" after his major work. The family name is sometimes spelled Weisz.

== Early life ==
Weiss was born in Munkács (Munkacz), Hungary (now Mukacheve, Ukraine). His father, Rabbi Samuel Zevi (Shmuel Tzvi) Weiss, was Av Beit Din of Munkacz, and his mother was the daughter of Tzvi Hirsch of Drohobycz, Austrian Empire (now Drohobych, Ukraine). Weiss attended the yeshiva of Rabbi Meir Eisenstaedter in Ungvár, Hungary (now Uzhhorod, Ukraine).

When Meir Eisenstaedter died in 1852, Weiss continued his studies under Meir's son, Rabbi Menachem Eisenstaedter. Weiss then studied with Rabbi Shmuel Smelke Klein of Hust (Huszt), Hungary (now Khust, Ukraine), author of Tzeror HaChaim. His foremost mentor of Hasidism was Rabbi Yitzchak Isaac Eichenstein of Ziditshov. Eichenstein is to have said: "I don't know why [Weiss] continues to visit us...He certainly does not need to acquire the fear of God from me." Weiss was also influenced by Rabbis Chaim Halberstam of Sanz, Sholom Rokeach of Belz, and Menachem Mendel Hager, the first Rebbe of Vizhnitz.

In 1854, when Weiss was 16, his mother died. That year, he married the daughter of Mordechai of Borsa (now Borşa, Romania), but she died three years later. Weiss married again and had two daughters, but his second wife died in 1868. In 1870, he married Perl, the daughter of Ezra Yaakov Basch of Szaplonca (Yiddish: Spinka), (now SăpânțaRomania), near the Hungarian border. In Spinka, Weiss would later become a study partner of the renowned Kabbalist Rabbi Yaakov Yehuda Aryeh Leib Frenkel.

== Rabbinate ==
In Munkács, Weiss established a yeshiva with a high level of Talmudic studies that drew students from other countries. Following the death of his mentor, the Rebbe of Zidichov, in June 1873, Weiss established his own Hasidic sect in his third wife's hometown of Spinka.

Weiss was called a "miracle worker", and attracted thousands of followers. He was also known for his self-mortification and ecstatic prayers. He prayed during festivals with the words from Musaf Amidah:

Bring together our scattered ones from among the nations and gather our dispersed from the uttermost parts of the earth. Lead us in triumph unto Zion thy City, and unto Jerusalem, and only then they will serve You with a perfect heart.

== Legacy ==
Weiss died in 1909. In 1972, his remains were reinterred in Petah Tikva, Israel.

Weiss was succeeded as Rebbe by his son, Rabbi Yitzchak Isaac Weiss (1875–1944). When World War II broke out, Yitzchak Isaac moved the Spinka court to Munkács. Yitzchak Isaac was murdered by the Nazis in the Auschwitz concentration camp, together with thirty one family members, in 1944. After the war, Yitzchak Isaac's grandson, Jacob Joseph Weiss, re-established the dynasty in Jerusalem. Other offshoots were established by descendants of Yosef Meir in Williamsburg, Boro Park, Flatbush, Queens, Kiryas Joel, London, Antwerp, and Bnei Brak.

== Works ==
Weiss died in 1909. His writings, published posthumously, were:

- Imrei Yosef (1910–27) – a four-volume commentary on the Chumash
- Imrei Yosef (1931) – sermons on the festivals and their customs
- Hakdamat Likkutei Torah ve-ha-Shas (1911) – sermons and Hasidic teachings
- Peirush la-Haggadah shel Pesach (1964) – a commentary on the Passover Haggadah
- Tefillot u-Minhagim (1912) – a collection of prayers and customs

== See also ==
- Spinka (Hasidic dynasty)
