= Mukachevo (air base) =

- IATA: none; ICAO: UKLM

Summary
- Airport type: Military
- Owner: Municipality of Mukachevo
- Location: Mukachevo, Ukraine
- Elevation AMSL: 390 ft / 119 m
- Coordinates: 48°24′0″N 022°41′0″E

Map
- Location in Zakarpattia Oblast Location in Ukraine

Runways
Direction	Length		Surface
Direction	ft	m	Surface
	8,202	2,500	Concrete

Mukachevo is an air base in Ukraine located 6 km southwest of Mukachevo. During the Cold War it served as a small interceptor base. The airfield had a loop taxiway with many parking revetments. The air base has since been moved to Stryi Air Base, leaving the airfield standing abandoned and empty.

The base was home to the

- 92nd Fighter Aviation Regiment between 1951 and 1993.
- 486th Fighter Aviation Regiment between 1951 and 1960.

== Airfield today ==
On 27 April 2021 Governor of Zakarpattia Oblast Anatoliy Poloskov, Zakarpattia Oblast Council chairman Oleksiy Petrov, representatives of the State Agency for Infrastructure Projects and the Mukachevo Territorial Community signed a quadripartite Memorandum of Cooperation on the design and construction of a new airport in Zakarpattia Oblast on the territory of Mukachevo. The new airport would replace Uzhhorod International Airport as Zakarpattia's main air link. Its proposed advantages over Uzhhorod will be a more centralized location, as well as its location completely within Ukrainian airspace (current flights to and from Uzhhorod have to cross over into Slovak territory).

== See also ==
- Mukachevo Radar Station
