= Spinka (Hasidic dynasty) =

Romanian Hasidic dynasty

Spinka Hasidic Dynasty
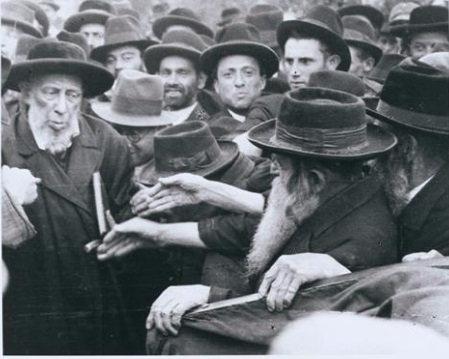
- Rabbi Isaac Weiss, the Chakal Yitzchak

Founder
- Yosef Meir Weiss

Regions with significant populations
- United States, Israel, United Kingdom, Belgium, Europe]

Religions
- Hasidic Judaism

Spinka is a Hasidic group within Haredi Judaism. The group originated in a town called Szaplonca (Yiddish: Spinka), in Máramaros County, Kingdom of Hungary (which became Săpânţa, Romania).

== Spinka rebbes ==
The first Spinka Rebbe was Rabbi Yosef Meir Weiss, author of Imrei Yosef. He was succeeded by his son, Rabbi Yitzchak Isaac Weiss, author of Chakal Yitzchak. The Chakal Yitzchak was murdered by the Nazis in the Holocaust. Another son, Naftali Weiss, the Bilker Rebbe, is a prominent subject in the Auschwitz Album of rare photographs taken at the death camp.

After World War II, the group was divided among many Rebbes, descendants of the Imrei Yosef. Spinka Rebbes can be found in Williamsburg, Borough Park, Flatbush, Kiryas Joel, Monsey, N.Y., Bnei Brak, London, Antwerp, throughout Israel, and Europe. All are offshoots of the original dynasty. Several Spinka Rebbes live in the Williamsburg section of Brooklyn alone (Toldos Tzvi, Beis Yitzchak, and Beis Shmuel Tzvi communities), and Israeli branches are found in Jerusalem and Bnei Brak.

Among the surnames of the Spinka Rebbes are Weiss (or Weisz), Kahana, and Horowitz.

== Lineage of Spinka rebbes ==
- Rabbi Yosef Meir Weiss, (1838–1909 (ו' אייר תרס"ט)) – Author of Imrei Yosef
  - Rabbi Yitzchak Isaac Weiss, (1875–1944) – Author of Chakal Yitzchak, son of the Imrei Yosef
    - Rabbi Yisrael Chaim Weiss, (d. 1944) – son of the Chakal Yitzchak
      - Rabbi Yaakov Yosef Weiss, (1916–1988) – Spinka Rebbe in Boro Park and Bnei Brak Author of Siach Yaakov – son of Rabbi Yisrael Chaim
        - Rabbi Naftali Tzvi Weiss – Spinka Rebbe – son of Rabbi Yaakov Yosef
        - Rabbi Yisrael Chaim Weiss – Spinka Donalow Rebbe of Bnei Brak – son of Rabbi Yaakov Yosef
        - Rabbi Meir Eleazer Weiss – Spinka 18th Ave Rebbe of Boro Park has synagogue also in Jerusalem – son of Rabbi Yaakov Yosef

== Lineage of Spinka Rebbes (Horowitz branch) ==
- Rabbi Yosef Meir Weiss – (1838–1909 (ו' אייר תרס"ט)) – Author of Imrei Yosef
  - Rabbi Yitzchak Isaac Weiss – (1875–1944) – Author of Chakal Yitzchak, son of the Imrei Yosef
    - Rabbi Avraham Abish Horowitz of Kruly, son-in-law of the Chakal Yitzchak
      - Rabbi Shmuel Tzvi Horowitz – Spinka Rebbe of Williamsburg – affectionately known as "Reb Hershele Spinker", son of Rabbi Abish of Kruly
        - Rabbi Yissachar Dov Berish Horowitz, (d. 2007 (י"ט תשרי תשס"ח)- Spinka Rebbe in Williamsburg – Beis Shmuel Tzvi Synagogue – the eldest son of Reb Hershele Spinker
          - Rabbi Yosef Meir Horowitz – Spinka Rebbe in Williamsbug – Beis Shmuel Tzvi Synagogue – eldest son of Reb Berish Spinker.
          - Rabbi Moshe Yaakov Horowitz – Spinka Rebbe in Airmont – Oholei Tzvi Synagogue – son Of Reb Berish Spinker.
          - Rabbi Ahron Dovid Horowitz – Zabiltover Rebbe in Williamsburg – son Of Reb Berish Spinker.
        - Rabbi Abraham Abish Horowitz Shlit"a – (A.K.A. Abish Spinka) Spinka Rebbe in Williamsburg – Beis Yitzchak Spinka Synagogue – son of Reb Hershele Spinker – Son in law of Rabbi Ahron Mordechai Rothner of Jerusalem
        - Rabbi Yitzchak Isaac Horowitz (A.K.A. Isaac Spinka) – Spinka Rebbe in Williamsburg – Toldos Tzvi Spinka Synagogue – son of Reb Hershele Spinker
        - Rabbi Nuta Horowitz – Spinka Rebbe in Bor Park- Zichron Avraham Synagogue – son of Reb Hershele Spinker
        - Rabbi Naftali Horowitz – Kruly Rebbe of Williamsburg – the youngest son of Reb Hershele Spinker

== Lineage of Spinka Rebbes (Kahana branch) ==
- Rabbi Yosef Meir Weiss (1838–1909 (ו' אייר תרס"ט) – Author of Imrei Yosef
- Rabbi Yitzchak Isaac Weiss – (1875–1944) – Author of Chakal Yitzchak, son of the Imrei Yosef
- Rabbi Nachman Kahana – Author of Orchos Chaim – son-in-law of the Imrei Yosef
  - Rabbi Tzvi Hirsch Kahana of Spinka
    - Rabbi Nachman Kahana, (d. 1976) Spinka-Kahana Rebbe of Bnei Brak – son of Rabbi Tzvi Hirsch
      - Rabbi Moshe Elyakim Briah Kahana,(d. May 2021) Spinka-Kahana Rebbe in Bnei Brak – son of Rabbi Nachman
      - Rabbi Leibel Kahana, Spinka-Kahana Rebbe of Bnei Brak son of Rabbi Moshe Elyakim Briah
      - Rabbi Yosef Yochanan Kahana Spinka Montreal Rebbe son of Rabbi Moshe Elyakim Briah
      - Rabbi Asher Yeshayah Aryeh Kahana, Spinka Rebbe in Kiryas Joel – son of Rabbi Nachman
      - Rabbi Menachem Mendel Kahana, Spinka Rebbe of London – son of Rabbi Nachman
      - Rabbi Baruch Kahana, Spinka Rebbe of Antwerp -
    - Rabbi Avraham Kahana, Spinka rebbe Beit Shemesh son of Rabbi Elimelech Kahana, Rosh Kolel of Zidichov Kollel in Bnei Brak
    - Rabbi Yosef Meir Kahana, (d. 1978), Spinka Rebbe of Jerusalem – son of Rabbi Tzvi Hirsch
      - Rabbi Mordecai Dovid Kahana Gedulas Mordechai (1932–2011), Spinka Rebbe of Jerusalem – son of Rabbi Yosef Meir
        - Rabbi Avraham Yitchak Kahana, (son of Rabbi Mordechai Dovid) spinka Rebbe of Jerusalem
          - Rabbi Hershel Rutner, Beis Yosef Spinka Beit Shemesh Rebbe and rosh Yeshiva, son of Rabbi Ahron Mordechai Rutner, son in law of Dombrove Rebbe Shlita

== Lineage of Zidichov Spinka Rebbes (Kahana branch) ==
- Rabbi Alter Kahana Rav of Zidichov Spinka Jerusalem died 2009, Brother of Rabbi Mordecai Dovid Kahana
- Rabbi Hershel Kahana, Zidichov Spinka Rebbe (son of Rabbi Alter)
- Rabbi Yitzchak Issac Kahana Zidichov Spinka Rebbe of Beit Shemesh (son of Rabbi Alter)
- Rabbi Yaakov Shloime Kahana Zidichov Spinka rebbe Of Jerusalem (son of rabbi Hershel)

== Financial fraud ==
In 2009, Rabbi Naftali Tzi Weisz and five other Spinka members pleaded guilty to charges in what prosecutors called "a decade-long tax fraud and money-laundering scheme".

== Gallery ==
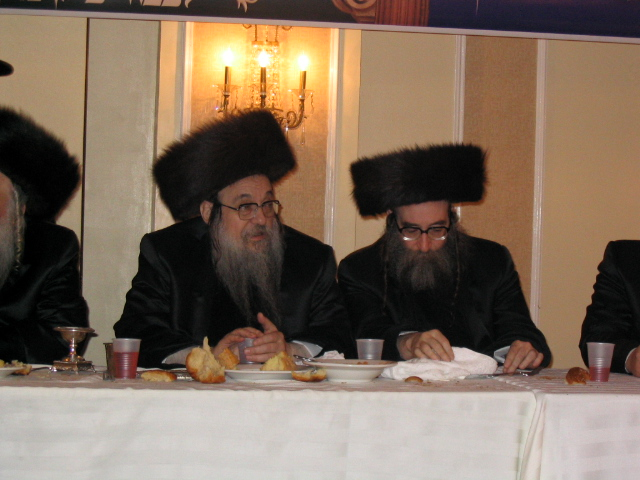
Two brothers, both Spinka Rebbes from Williamsburg, Rabbis Isaac Horowitz and the deceased Rabbi Berish Horowitz, sons of Rebbe Hershele Spinker

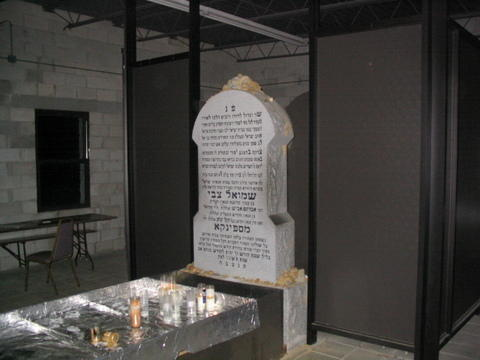
Grave of Rabbi Shmuel Tzvi "Hershele" Horowitz, Spinka Rebbe of

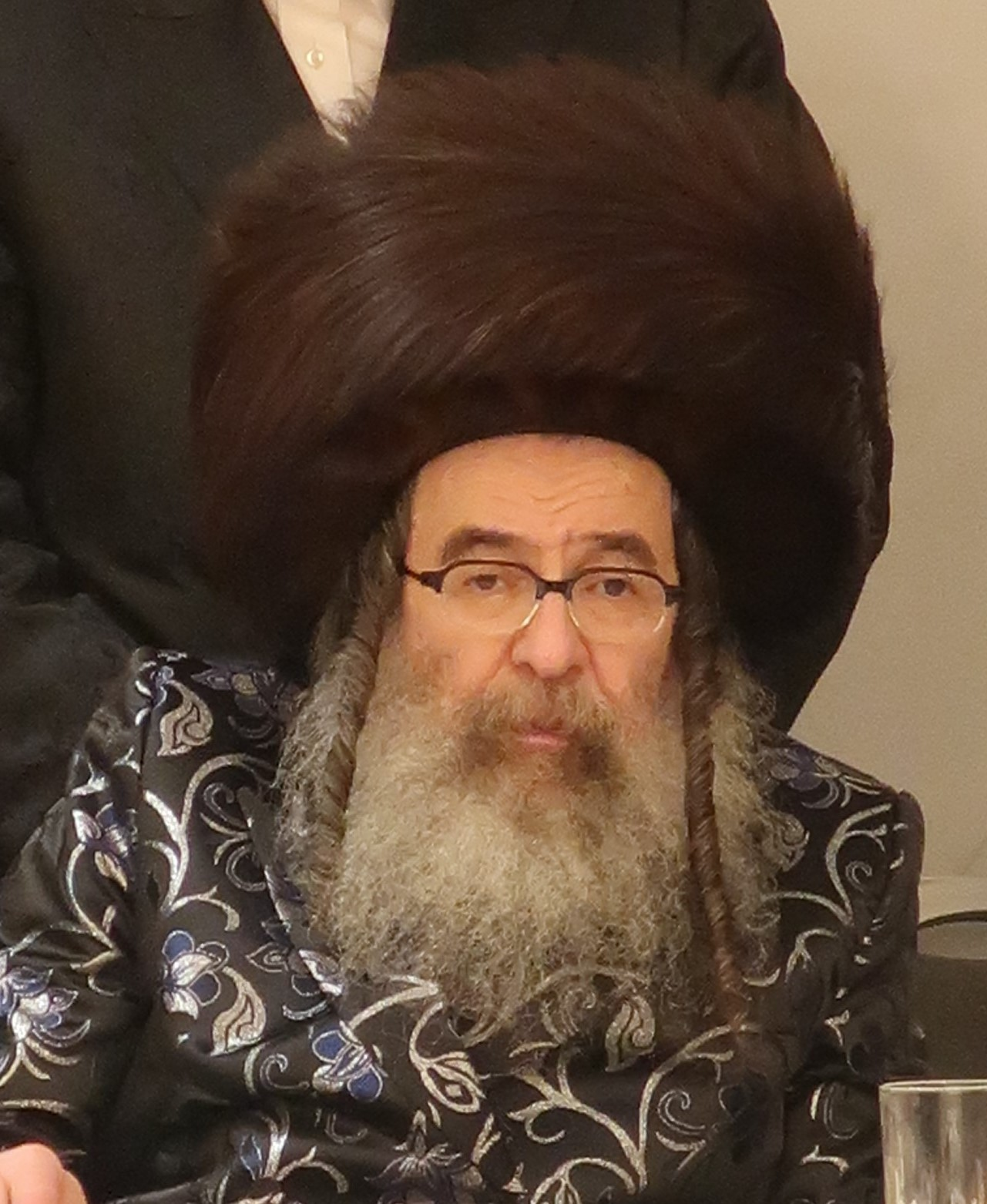
Rabbi Abish Horowitz Spinka Rebbe in Williamsburg – Beis Yitzchak Spinka
