= Ezra Bick =

American–Israeli Modern Orthodox rabbi, author, editor and lecturer

Rabbi Ezra Bick עזרא ביק
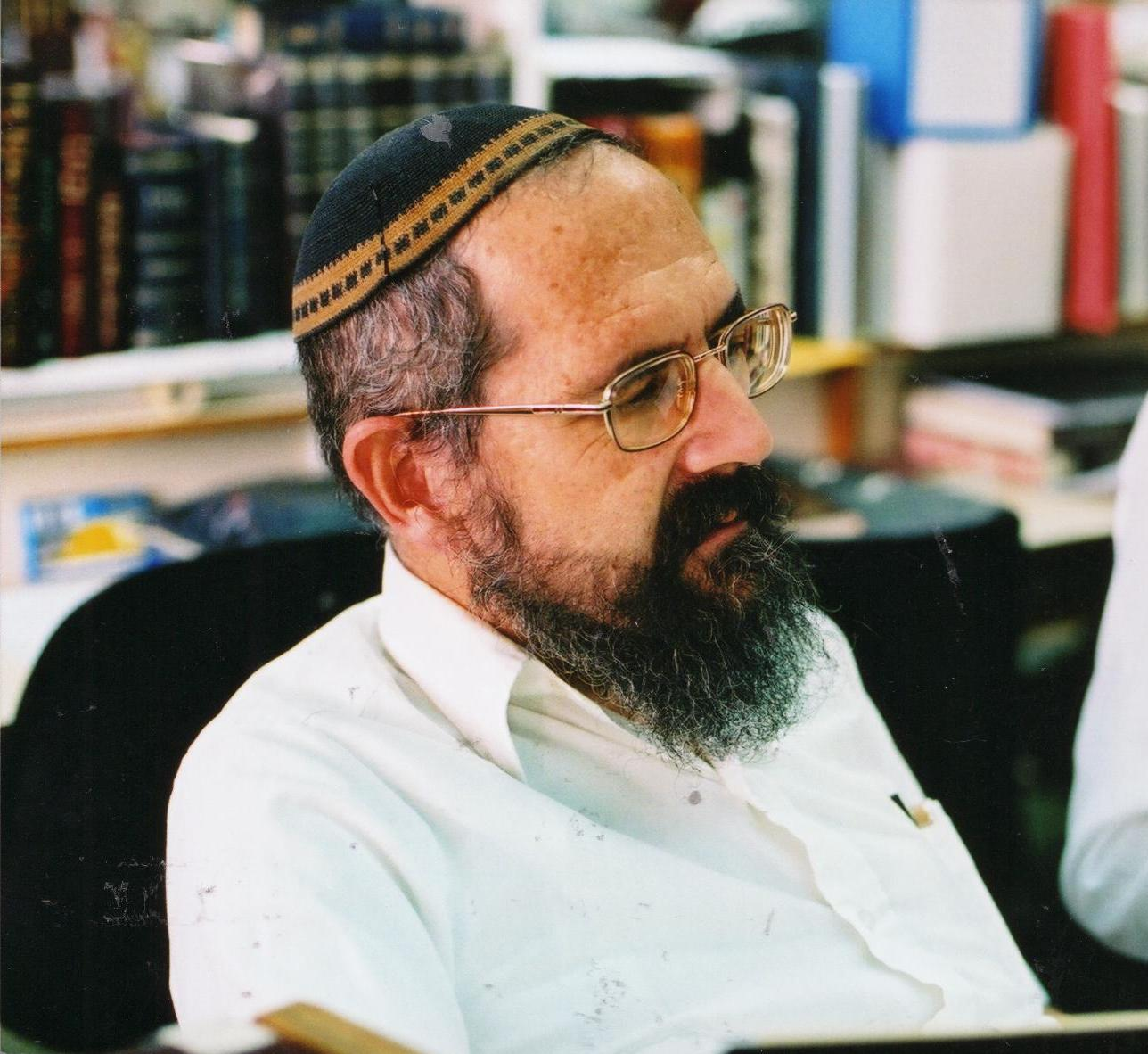

Personal life
- Born: 1950 (age 75–76) United States
- Spouse: Etta Pauline Zablocki
- Dynasty: Rapoport-Bick (rabbinic dynasty)
- Education: Yeshiva University, Columbia University

Religious life
- Religion: Judaism
- Denomination: Modern Orthodoxy, Religious Zionism
- Yeshiva: Yeshivat Har Etzion
- Organisation: Israel Koschitzky Virtual Beit Midrash
- Residence: Alon Shevut
- Dynasty: Rapoport-Bick (rabbinic dynasty)
- Semikhah: Rabbi Isaac Elchanan Theological Seminary

Ezra Aharon Bick (Hebrew: עזרא אהרן ביק; born 1950) is an American–Israeli Modern Orthodox rabbi, author, editor and lecturer, as well as a scion of the Rapoport-Bick rabbinic dynasty. He is a Ram at Yeshivat Har Etzion in Alon Shevut. Rav Bick is director of the Israel Koschitzky Virtual Beit Midrash and Halacha editor-in-chief of Deracheha]p.

== Biography ==
Rav Bick was born in the United States to Charles (Yeshayah) Bick, son of Rabbi Hayyim Yechiel Mikhel Bick of the Rapoport-Bick rabbinic dynasty. Yeshayah was a well-known Mizrachi figure, and his Zionist activities were encouraged by his father, Rabbi Hayyim Yechiel. Rav Bick grew up in Forest Hills, Queens.

Rav Bick earned his Semicha from the Rabbi Isaac Elchanan Theological Seminary, and holds an M.S. degree in Jewish Philosophy from Yeshiva University. Rav Bick was a student of both Rabbi Joseph B. Soloveitchik and of Rabbi Aharon Lichtenstein at Yeshiva University. Rav Bick also holds a Masters in Philosophy from Columbia University.

Rav Bick learned with Rabbi Mordechai Willig, while they were both studying under Rav Lichtenstein at Yeshiva University. Rav Bick served as an instructor at the Stern College for Women during his time New York. Rav Bick went on Aliyah in 1977, moving from New York to Alon Shevut and taking on the role of Ram at Yeshivat Har Etzion.

Rav Bick is the author of In His Mercy: Understanding the Thirteen Midot and Shemoneh Esrei: Exploring the Fundamentals of Faith through the Amida Prayer. Rav Bick has published numerous articles and is the editor of the Torah MiEtzion series. He has been director of the Israel Koschitzky Virtual Beit Midrash of Yeshivat Har Etzion since 1995. He is the Halacha editor-in-chief of Deracheha.

== Personal ==
Rav Bick married Etta Pauline Zablocki on January 4, 1976. They live in Alon Shevut.
