= Medzhybizh =

Rural locality in Khmelnytskyi Oblast, Ukraine

Medzhybizh Меджибіж Międzybóż • Меджибож
- Rural settlement
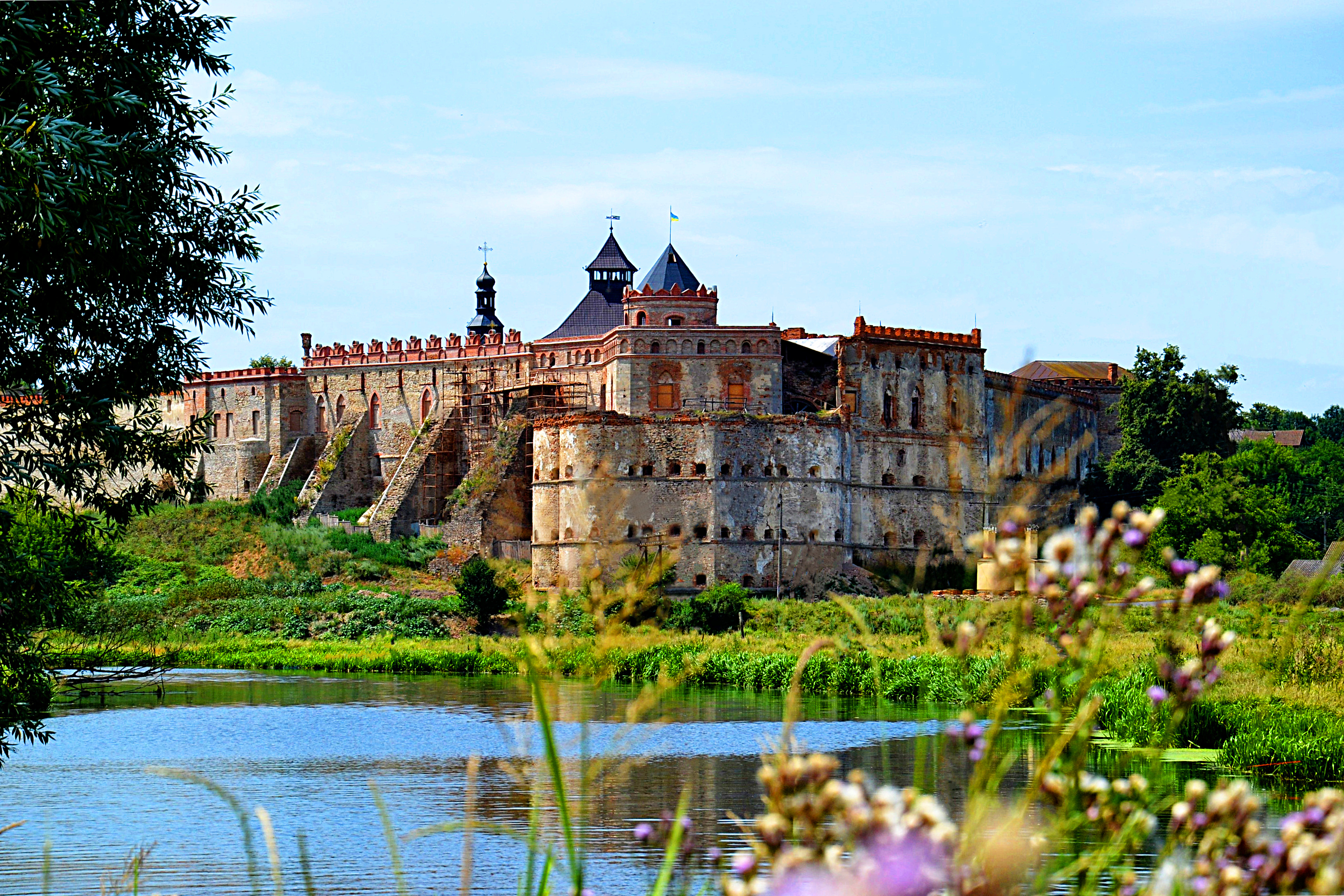
- Medzhybizh Castle today

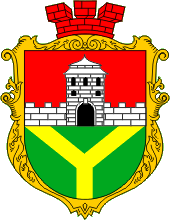
- Coat of arms
- Interactive map of Medzhybizh
- Location of Medzhybizh Medzhybizh (Ukraine)
- Coordinates: 49°26′0″N 27°25′0″E
- Country: Ukraine
- Oblast: Khmelnytskyi Oblast
- Raion: Khmelnytskyi Raion
- Hromada: Medzhybizh settlement hromada
- First mentioned: 1146

Population (2001)
  - Total: 1,731
  - Density: 2.38/km^{2} (6.2/sq mi)
- Postal code: 31530
- Area code: +380 3857

Medzhybizh (Ukrainian: Меджибіж; Polish: Międzybóż; German: Medschybisch; Yiddish: מעזשביזש, romanized: Mezhbizh), formerly Mezhybozhe, is a rural settlement in Khmelnytskyi Oblast, western Ukraine. It is located in Khmelnytskyi Raion, 25 kilometres from Khmelnytskyi on the main highway between Khmelnytskyi and Vinnytsia at the confluence of the Southern Buh and Buzhok rivers.

Medzhybizh was once a prominent town of the Podolia province. It is known as the birthplace of the Jewish Hasidic mystical religious movement. Today the settlement hosts the administration of Medzhybizh settlement hromada, one of the hromadas of Ukraine. Current population: 1,237 (2022 estimate); 1,731, (2001 census).

== Name ==
The town was first mentioned under the name Mezhybozhye (Межибож'є), which denotes its location between the Buh and Buzhok rivers.

In 1912 the local Jewish community petitioned Russian imperial authorities to rename Medzhybizh into Borodino, after the eponymous battle, and grant it city status. However, in 1915 that petition was overturned.

== History ==
=== Earliest history ===
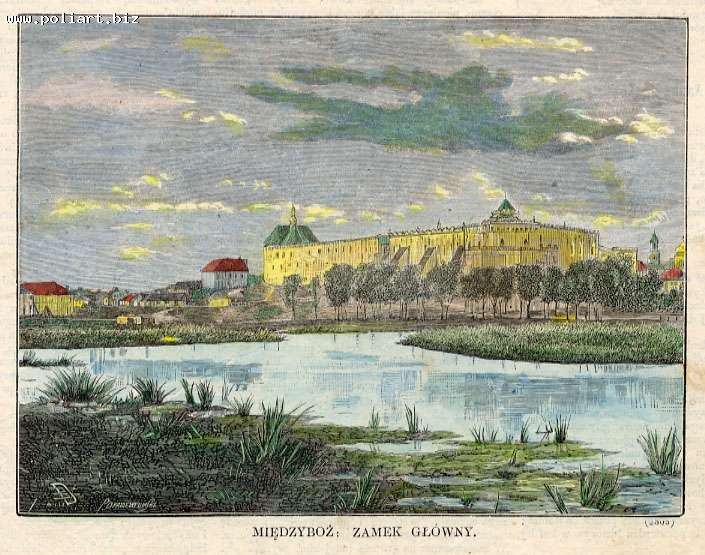
Medzhybizh Castle in 1871

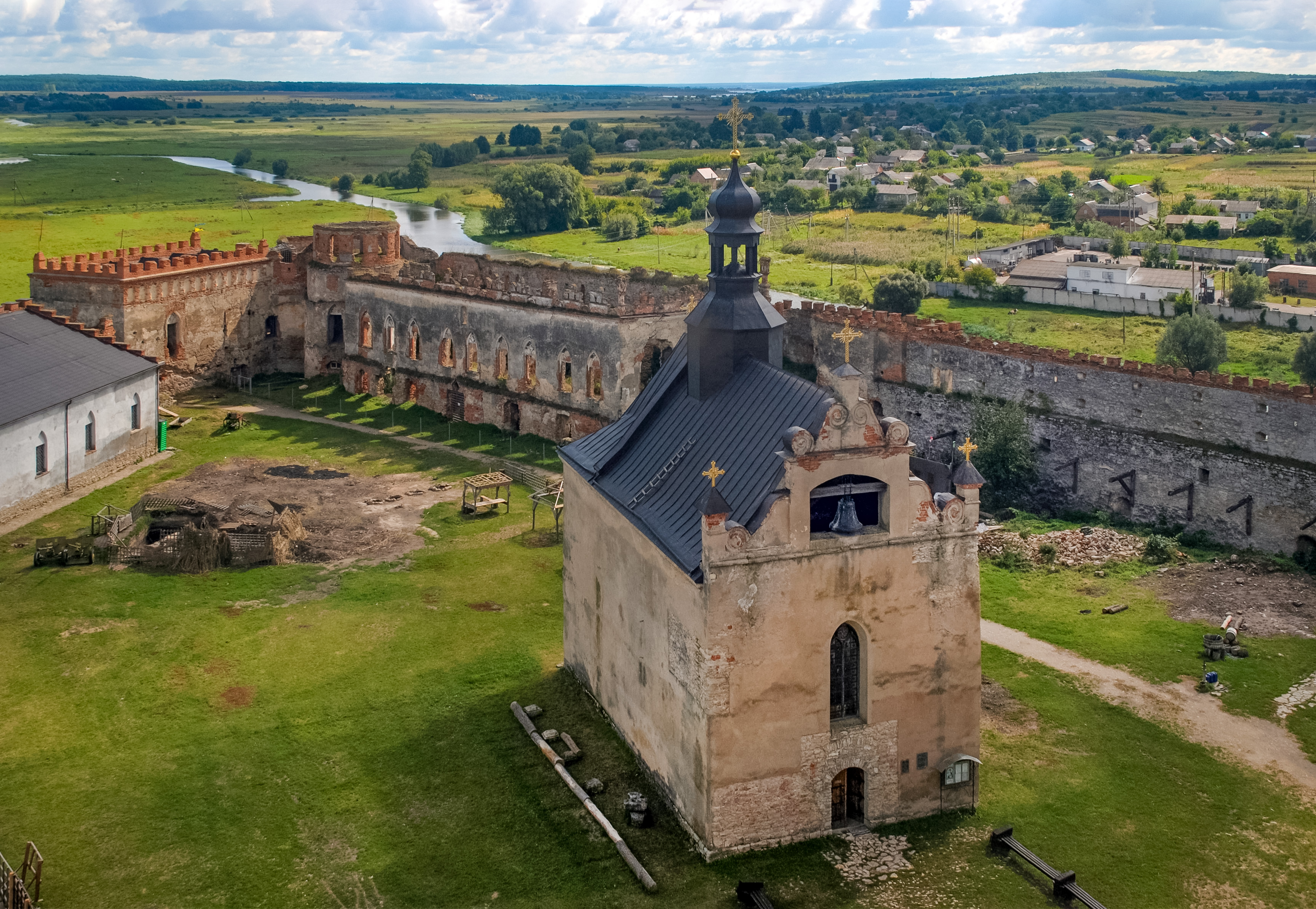
The Orthodox church under renovation inside Medzhybizh castle. Originally built in 1586 as a Polish Catholic church.

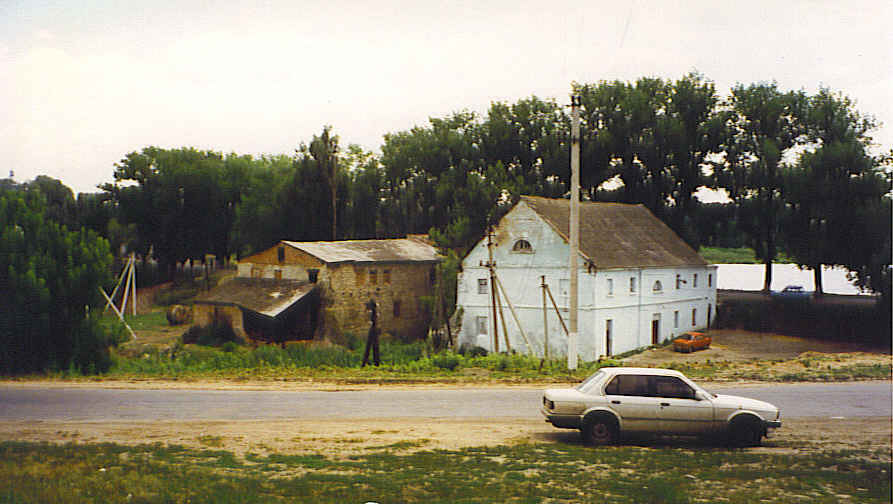
19th-century mill buildings adjacent to the mill dam and the lake on the Southern Buh

Medzhybizh is first mentioned in chronicles as an estate in Kievan Rus. It was given to Prince Svyatoslav by the prince of Kyiv in the year 1146. In 1148, ownership transferred to Rostyslav, the son of Yuri Dolgoruky. During the 13th entury, the settlement was part of the Bolokhiv Land, which served as a buffer zone between the Golden Horde and possessions of Daniel of Galicia. Following the participation of Bolokhovians in the Mongol invasion of his lands, in 1241 Daniel conquered and sacked Medzhybizh. New fortifications erected by the prince were then destroyed on the order of khan Boroldai in 1258.

Following the defeat of Tatars by prince Olgerd in 1362, Medzhybizh became part of the Lutsk land under the rule of Liubart. Soon thereafter, it was fully incorporated by the Grand Duchy of Lithuania, becoming a possession of the Koriatovychi family of Podolia. The town suffered from numerous attacks by the Tatars in 1453, 1506, 1516, 1546, 1558, 1566, and 1615. In 1444 Medzhybizh was incorporated into lands of the Polish Crown and became a powiat centre. During that period it was came into possession of Zborowski and Herburt families.

In the 16th century, the settlement was controlled by the Sieniawski and Potocki Polish noble families. In 1511 work began to replace the wooden palisades with massive stone fortifications, many of which can still be seen today. A dam was built across the Southern Bug river to provide a defensive lake, and a rhomboid Medzhybizh Castle with four towers was built. The state-of-the-art fortifications made Medzhybizh one of the strongest military sites in the region and led to the rise of its prosperity in the next three centuries. - In the mid-16th century the Zasławski family, a Polish noble family, turned Medzhybizh into an impregnable fortress. The Zaslavskys used Medzhybizh as their base from which to defend the southern borders from the incursions of the Ottoman Turks and Crimean Tatars.

In 1571 a local census was conducted, listing the population as being made up of 95 Ruthenians, 35 Jews, and 30 Poles. In 1593, after a petition by Adam Sienawski, king Sigismund III Vasa granted the town Magdeburg rights. During the late 16th and early 17th century, a school affiliated Lviv Dormition Brotherhood was active at a local Orthodox church.

=== The Cossack uprising of 1648 ===
In 1648, the Cossack uprising led by Bohdan Khmelnytsky captured the town three times and held the region for the period of one year. At the time, there were approximately 12,000 residents living in Medzhybizh and its environs. Of this number there were 2500 Jews living in Medzhibozh in the year 1648 out of a total Jewish population of Podolia of 4000 souls (spread between 18 communities). The massacre of the Jews by the Cossacks under the command of Danylo Nechay and Maksym Kryvonis occurred on July 20, 1648 in Medzhybizh; almost all 2500 Jews were either killed or taken into captivity.

The Jewish population in Medzhybizh was virtually eradicated, and there were no burials recorded for several years after 1648, consistent with depopulation. As late as 1661, only a handful of Jews remained in Medzhybizh. In the 1678 census their numbers had reportedly increased to 275 residents.

Jan Casimir and Khmelnytsky negotiated a treaty in 1649, however, the hostilities continued into 1651 and 1653. In 1657, the Hungarian Prince Rákóczi took the city, eventually ceding it to the Turks in 1672. It remained under Turkish administration until 1682.

=== Turkish rule and return under Polish control ===
Weakened by the Cossack uprising, Podolia was invaded and occupied by Turkey in 1672. Medzhybizh became part of the Turkish Eyalet of Kamieniecki as "Mejibuji" and was a sanjak center with nahiyas of Mejibuji, Poloskiruf, Çornosturuf and Konstantın.

In 1682, Medzhybizh was recaptured by the Poles under Jan Sobieski. However, they did not regain full control until 1699 because the town was frequently ravaged by ongoing struggles with the Turks.

After Medzhybizh was recaptured from the Turks, it went through what many consider its golden age during the 17th and 18th centuries. Under the Sieniawski family and later the Czartoryski family, the town prospered. Medzhybizh successfully defended itself from several Haidamak attacks. By the mid-18th century, Medzhybizh was the seat of power in Podilia Province. It had a population of nearly 5,000, of which there were 2,500 Jews.

In 1790, the 45-year-old Kościuszko, who was garrisoned here, fell in love with 18-year-old Tekla Zurowska. There are several known love letters. Due to the age gap and apparent lack of financial resources on the side of Kościuszko, Zurowska's parents didn't consent to a marriage, despite the fact the love was reciprocated.

=== Russian rule ===
In 1793, Medzhybizh fell into Russian hands during the second partition of Poland. The manor of Czartoryski family was initially confiscated by the new authorities, but returned to its owners in 1795. The Czartoryski family continued to own the town until Prince Adam Czartoryski was forced into exile in 1831 due to his participation in the November Uprising. During Russian rule, the seat of power for Podilia moved from Medzhybizh to Kamianets-Podilskyi. The economy of Medzhybizh deteriorated because the railroad line bypassed the town to the south. The nearby town of Letychiv, however, flourished.

In the late 1880s through World War I, Medzhybizh became a center of military activity, housing an important garrison within its castle grounds. Military units would be stationed in the town until 1920.

A commemorative plaque marks the place where the famous Ukrainian poet Taras Shevchenko stayed in October 1846 participating in an archeological expedition. It is here that he composed his famous poem "Rozryta mohyla" – "The Ransacked Grave".

=== Early 20th century ===
After the 1917 Bolshevik Revolution, the territory was occupied by German and Hungarian troops until the end of World War I. Medzhybizh was the scene of numerous pogroms during the Russian Civil War (Ukrainian War of Independence) of 1919–1922. The town changed hands many times as different militia units from either the Bolsheviks, Ukrainian Nationalists, Poles, or Whites gained temporary control. What little wealth was left was stripped in these pogroms, turning the entire area into ruins.

Under Soviet rule starting 1922, the region's economy improved. Electricity, schools, roads and other infrastructure were built. Several kolkhozi (collective farms) were established near Medzhybizh.

In the early 1930s, pressure from the government to break the peasant resistance to collectivization resulted in famines throughout Ukraine. Recently a museum dedicated to the memory of the many local inhabitants who died during the Holodomor was opened in Medzhybizh containing original documents from the area relating to the shooting of all villagers who opposed entering the kolhoz collective farms.

=== World War II and aftermath ===
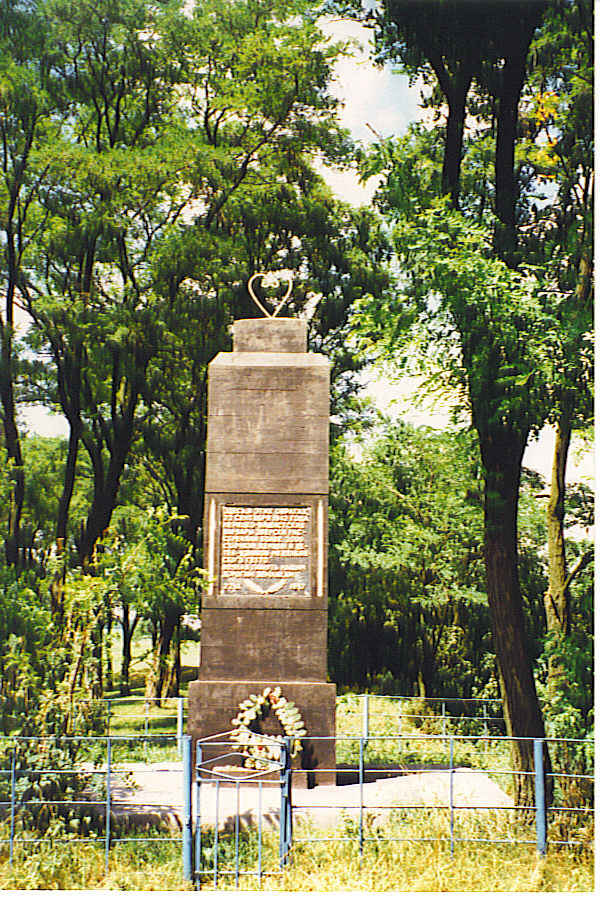
Monument to the approximately 3,000 Medzhybizh Jews who were executed in three nearby ravines in 1942

Medzhybizh fell to German troops during Operation Barbarossa on July 8, 1941, with relatively light resistance. It remained under German occupation until it was liberated by Soviet forces on March 24, 1944.

Medzhybizh was astride an important east–west supply road that the German occupant's administration wanted to expand into an autobahn-like highway. This road led directly between the city of Proskuriv (now Khmelnytskyi) and routes westward into Germany and the city of Vinnytsia with routes to the eastern front. Vinnytsia was the site of Hitler's headquarters bunker in Soviet territory where he personally directed the war between 1942 and 1943.

The German Nazis set up Jewish ghettos in Medzhybizh and in Letychiv to assist Organisation Todt in providing slave labor for the road building project. Because of this special road project, Medzhybizh retained its Jewish population longer than most of the surrounding communities, where Einsatzgruppen units executed entire populations of Jews shortly after the beginning of German occupation. When the road project was completed in the summer of 1942, the Einsatzgruppen units were called in and three separate mass shootings of Jews occurred between August 21, 1942, and October 31, 1942, that murdered all Jews in the ghetto. Soviet authorities reported that a total of 2,558 Jews were murdered in ravines to the west of town.

Roman Shukhevych, commander of the Nachtigall Battalion stopped in Medzhybizh and there refused to fight against the Soviets for the Nazis until Yaroslav Stetsko was released from custody. The Battalion was disarmed and sent to Germany.

In 1959 the main Uspenska Cathedral was destroyed and the stones used for roads to the various farms around the city. In 1965 the Dominican Cathedral was blown up.

=== Medzhybizh today ===
Until 18 July 2020, Medzhybizh belonged to Letychiv Raion. The raion was abolished in July 2020 as part of the administrative reform of Ukraine, which reduced the number of raions of Khmelnytskyi Oblast to three. The area of Letychiv Raion was merged into Khmelnytskyi Raion.

Until 26 January 2024, Medzhybizh was designated urban-type settlement. On this day, a new law entered into force which abolished this status, and Medzhybizh became a rural settlement.

A large museum in memory of the victims of the Holodomor is located in the fortress. There is a number of expositions available to visitors explaining the tragic events of 1930–1932. The castle houses a small museum devoted to the Ukrainian history of the town.

Several Jewish sites are either being restored or were recently renovated as they have become an important Jewish tourist attraction. The old Jewish cemetery is the site of ongoing restoration efforts. The location of its famous graves are now protected by a modern building. The Apter Rav's shul is currently undergoing renovation. A complete re-creation of the Besht's shul was recently constructed on its original site.

A new hachnosas orchim building has been erected in 2012 and in 2015 on the Yom Hillula of the Baal Shem Tov that falls on Shavuos, another building to accommodate over 200 guests for sleeping was made available. Yisroel Meir Gabbai of Oholei Tzadikim, has built a mikvah connected and right by the spring of where the Baal Shem Tov use to immerse himself. The project took five years and cost an estimated $500,000. The premises are accessible 24 hours a day.

== Jewish history and culture ==
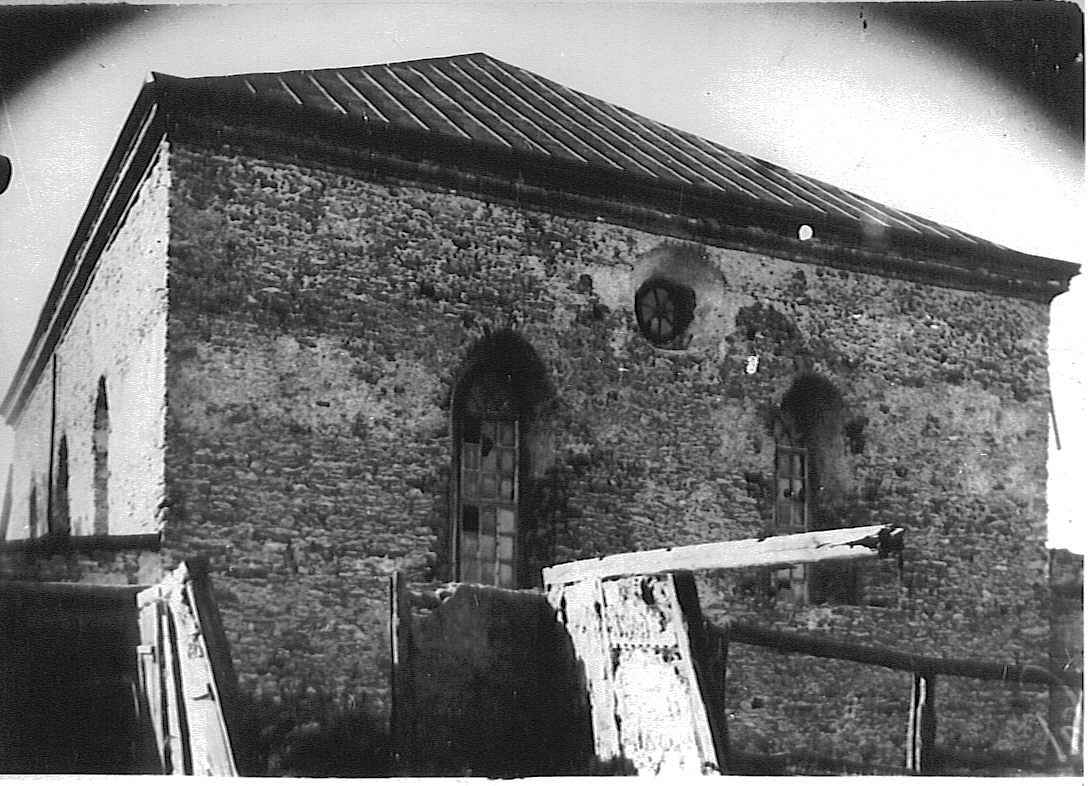
The fortress-like Sirkes Shul in Medzhybizh, probably built in the 17th century (photo taken in 1935)

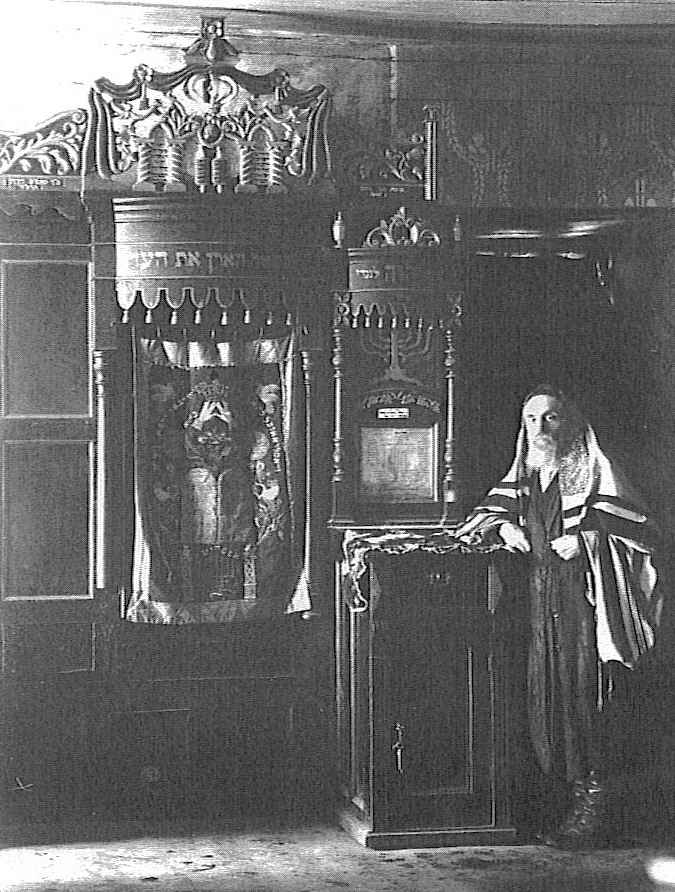
The interior of the main Sirkes Shul in Medzhybizh in 1930

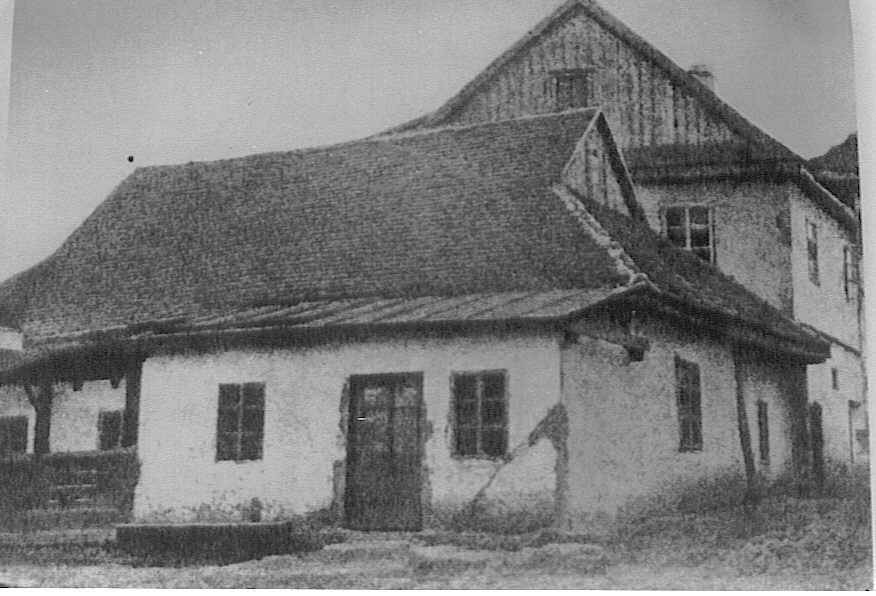
Exterior of the Baal Shem Tov's Shul in Medzhybizh, c. 1915. This original shul no longer exists, but was recently re-created.

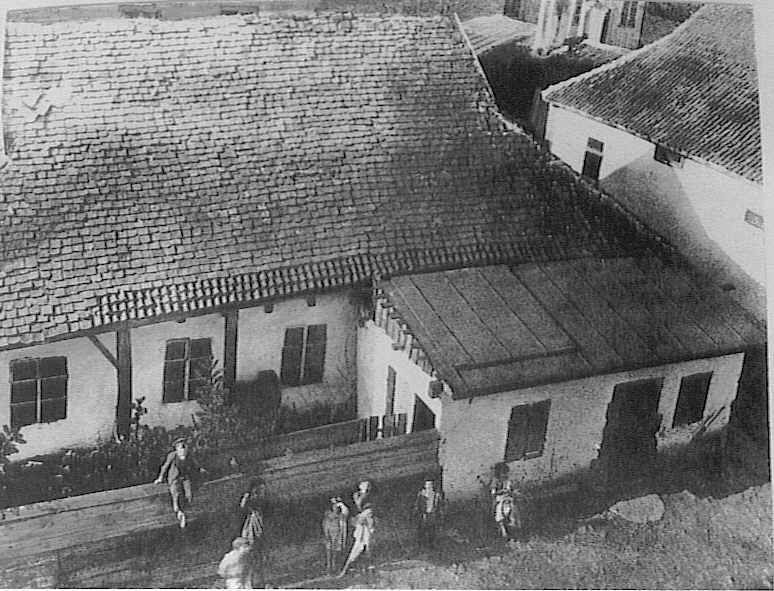
Another view of the Baal Shem Tov's Shul, c. 1915

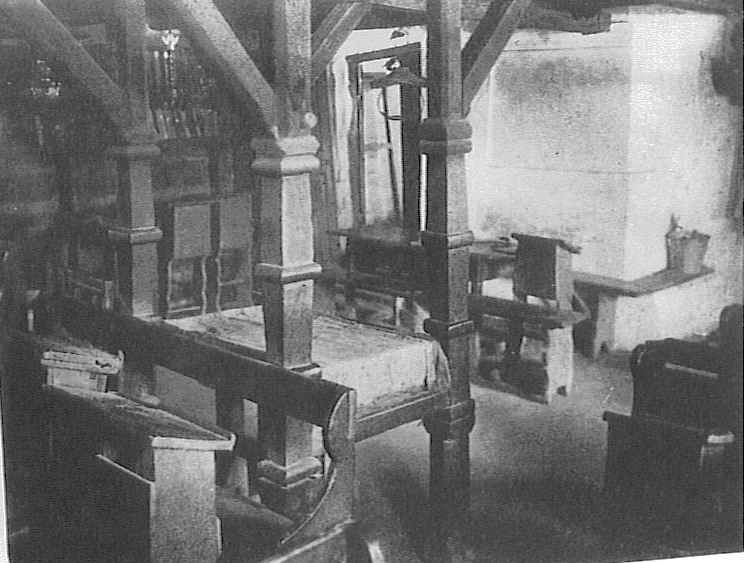
Interior of the Baal Shem Tov's Shul, c. 1915

Medzhybizh was the center of Jewish culture in its region in Ukraine. The first records of Jews in Medzhybizh date back to the early 16th century. These records state that various Jews were granted special privileges by the Polish kings, including a proclamation in 1566 by King Sigismund II Augustus that the Jews of Medzhybizh were exempt from paying taxes in perpetuity. The earliest known burial in the Jewish cemetery dates from 1555.

Many key rabbinic leaders lived in Medzhybizh during the 17th through 20th centuries. The earliest important rabbi to make Medzhybizh home was Rabbi Joel Sirkes (1561–1640), a key figure in Judaism at that time. He lived in Medzhybizh from 1604 to 1612.

The most important Hasidic rabbi from Medzyhbizh was Rabbi Israel ben Eliezer Baal Shem Tov "Besht" (1698–1760), the founder of Hasidism. He lived in Medzhybizh from about 1742 until his death in 1760. His grave can be viewed today in the Medzhybizh old Jewish cemetery.

The Baal Shem Tov is considered one of the key Jewish personalities of the 18th century who has shaped Judaism into what it is today. His work led to the founding the Hasidic movement, established by his disciples, some of whom also lived in Medzhybizh, but most of whom traveled from all over Eastern Europe, sometimes from great distances, to visit and learn from him. In Medzhybizh, the Baal Shem Tov was also known as a "doktor" and healer to both Jews and non-Jews. He was known to have been given a special tax-free dispensation by the Czartoryski family and his house shows up on several town censuses.

There were two fundamentally different rabbinic leaders in the town, those who were Hasidic and those who were not. In general, both groups got along, but the followers of the Hasidic leaders emphasized certain aspects of Judaism, such as emotions in observance of the commandments and ritual purity. The non-Hasidic leaders tended to follow a scholarly path and were more responsible for the Jewish institutions, such as observance of kashrut, the social structure of the town, liaison with the town's nobles, and control of the Jewish court.

Hasidic leaders included Rabbi Boruch of Medzhybizh (1757–1811), the Baal Shem Tov's grandson. Rabbi Boruch was notable for his principle of malkhus ("royalty") and conducted his court accordingly. He was also known for his "melancholy" and he had a fiery temper. Many of his grandfather's disciples and the great Hasidic leaders of the time, regularly visited Rabbi Boruch, including the Magid of Chernobyl, the Magid of Mezritch, Rabbi Shneur Zalman of Liadi (founder of the Chabad Hasidic movement), and others.

In an attempt to remedy Rabbi Boruch's melancholy, his followers brought in Hershel of Ostropol as a "court jester" of sorts. Hershel was one of the first documented Jewish comedians and his exploits are legendary within both the Jewish and non-Jewish communities. Hershel is also buried in the old Jewish cemetery in Medzhybizh, though his grave is unmarked.

Rabbi Nachman of Breslav (1772–1810), the Baal Shem Tov's great-grandson, was born in Medzhybizh but left at an early age. He became the founder of the Breslover Hasidim.

Another Hasidic leader, Rabbi Avraham Yehoshua Heshel of Apt (1748–1825) "The Apter Rov", made Medzhybizh his home from 1813 until his death in 1825. The Apter Rov is also buried in the old Jewish cemetery in Medzhybizh, very close to the Baal Shem Tov's grave. The Heshel family became one of the foremost Hasidic rabbinic dynasties and various descendants remained in Medzhybizh well into the 20th century.

The non-Hasidic rabbinic leadership of Medzhybizh was controlled by the Rapoport-Bick dynasty, the most important of all the non-Hasidic rabbinic dynasties of Medzhybizh. Rabbi Dov Berish Rapoport (d. 1823) was the first to make Medzhybizh his home. He was the grandson of Rabbi Chaim haCohen Rapoport of Lviv (d. 1771), a notable sage during the mid-18th century. Dov Berish Rapoport's grave can be seen today at the old Jewish cemetery in Medzhybizh. Other rabbis of this dynasty include Rabbi Isaac Bick (1864–1934) who immigrated to America in 1925 and founded a synagogue in Rhode Island. Rabbi Chaim Yekhiel Mikhel Bick (1887–1964) was the last known rabbi to reside in Medzhybizh. He left Medzhybizh for New York in 1925. It is not known whether Medzhybizh had another rabbi when it served as a Jewish ghetto in World War II.

The Rapoport Dynasty traces its roots back to Rabbi Jacob Emden (1697–1776) who was involved in the Frankist debates and his father Rabbi Tsvi Hirsh Ashkenazi, known as the Chacham Tsvi (1660–1718). The Rapoports themselves are a long distinguished rabbinic family who traces their roots back to Central Europe and Northern Italy in the 15th century. The first Rapoport rabbi to make his home in Medzhybizh was Rabbi Dov Berish Rapoport (d. 1823). He was the grandson of Rabbi Chaim haCohen Rapoport of Lviv (d. 1771), who was also involved in the Frankist debates. Rabbi Dov Berish became the head of the Jewish court (Av Beth Din) and leader of the entire Jewish community of Medzhybizh. However, in a dispute with Rabbi Moshe Chaim Ephraim, the Baal Shem Tov's grandson around the year 1800, the non-Hasidic and the Hasidic communities separated into two leadership groups. The Rapoport/Bick family continued to control the town's Jewish religious court. The Hasidic community at the time chose Rabbi Issachar Dov-Ber Landa to represent them in official matters. Both Rabbis Rapoport and Landa are buried side by side in the Medzhybizh Jewish cemetery, just a few steps away from the Baal Shem Tov's grave.

=== Jewish institutions in Medzhybizh ===
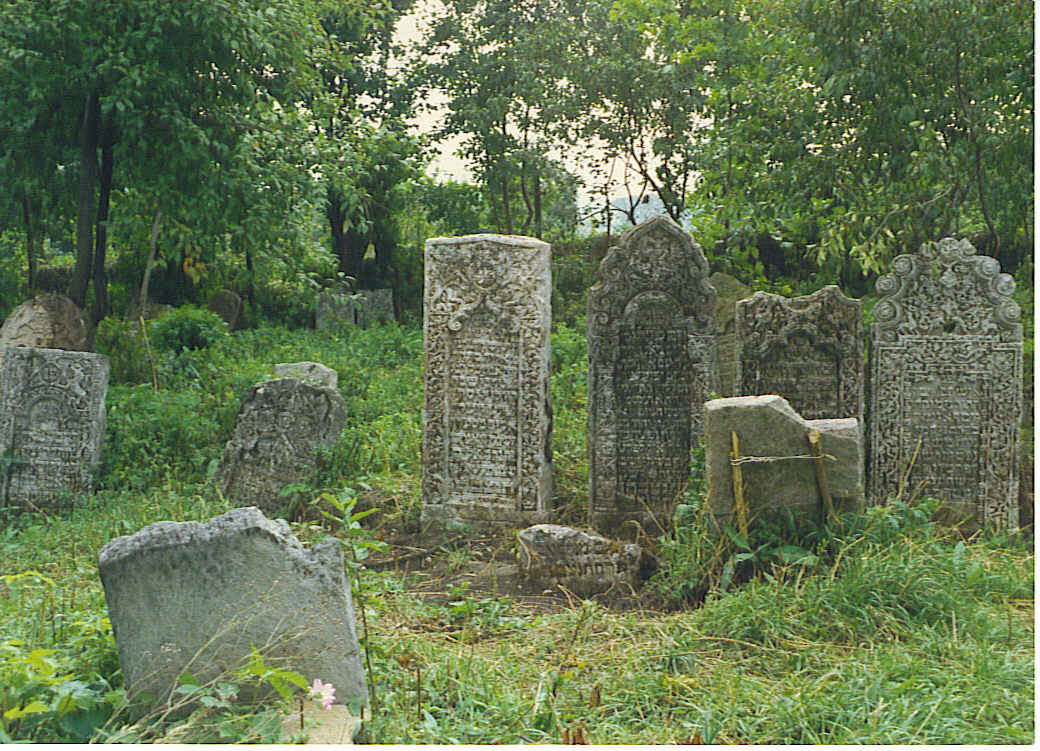
18th-century gravestones at the old Jewish cemetery in Medzhybizh

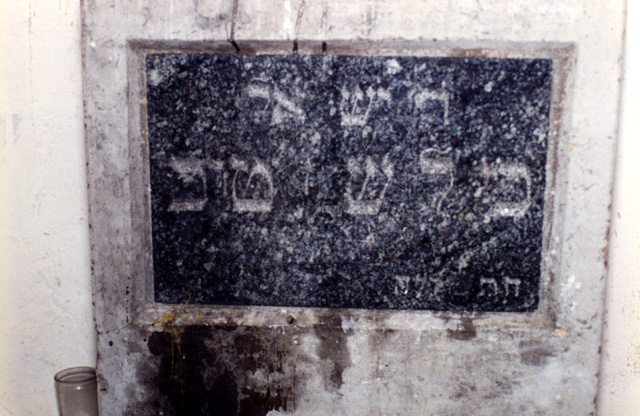
Gravestone of the Baal Shem Tov in Medzhybizh

Medzhybizh was the home to at least two synagogue buildings and numerous small minyanim. One synagogue still stands today but is used for other purposes. It was the synagogue of R. Avraham Yehoshua Heshel, the Apter Rov. In early 2008, it was bought by the Ohalei Zaddikim organization and is slated for reconstruction. The other synagogue, the Baal Shem Tov's old wooden synagogue, was torn down for firewood during World War II. It has recently been rebuilt according to plan.

Medzhybizh also contains two Jewish cemeteries. The old Jewish cemetery contains the grave of the Baal Shem Tov and other famous and notable Jews. It has turned into something of a tourist attraction, a magnet for Hasidic Jews from all over the world. The new Jewish cemetery has graves from the early 19th century through to the 1980s. A Nazi mass killing site outside of town holds the graves of almost 3,000 Jews in 3 different trenches.

== Paleolithic site ==
Paleolithic site Medzhibozh – an archaeological site located near the village Medzhibizh. The age of the Paleolithic site is 400–450 thousand years old.

== Sites to see ==
Today, Medzhybizh is dominated by a castle and fortifications built during the Polish period. Many of these fortifications are deteriorating, however inside the castle is a museum which describes some of the history of the area. The castle itself consists of four towers and overlooks the main road and the dam.

Just outside the castle, the dam and the lake are still in working order. Adjacent to the dam are two old mill buildings that are no longer used but used to be a valuable concession (arenda) during Tsarist and Polish times.

North of town is the old Jewish cemetery, which has turned into a tourist attraction primarily for Hasidic Jews making a pilgrimage to see the Baal Shem Tov's grave. Legend has it that this cemetery remained protected and well-preserved during World War II because the local Ukrainian population remembered the Baal Shem Tov's healing powers during his lifetime and they were afraid of his powerful magic even beyond the grave. The old Jewish cemetery contains a modern building over the graves of the important Jewish dignitaries. Other gravestones in this cemetery are worth visiting as the artwork on many stones shows a level of cultural achievement matching the rise of importance of the town. The oldest burial in this cemetery dates from 1555.

Toward the central western portion of the town is the new Jewish cemetery, which is only in fair condition. Here Jews are buried from the early 19th century through modern times.

Outside of town to the west, and adjacent to the Southern Bug river, is the Nazi mass killing site where approximately 3,000 Jews were buried. A monument marks the site. The three ravines that hold the graves are covered in concrete.

== Notable people associated with Medzhybizh ==
- Mykhailo Hunashevskyi, 17th-century author of the Lviv Chronicle
- Rabbi Joel Sirkes (1561–1640), "the Ba"ch," major halachist and Talmud commentator (rabbi in Medzhybizh)
- Rabbi Israel ben Eliezar Baal Shem Tov (1698–1760), founder of Chasidism
- Rabbi Boruch of Medzhybizh (1757–1811), son of Udl the daughter of the Baal Shem Tov
- Rabbi Nachman of Breslov (1772–1810), Great Grandson of the Baal Shem Tov and founder of the Breslov Hasidic dynasty (born in Medzhybizh)
- Rabbi Ze'ev Wolf Kitzes (c. 1685–1788), a disciple of the Baal Shem Tov. Buried next to the Baal Shem Tov in Medzhybizh.
- Hershel of Ostropol (early 19th century), a Jewish comedy figure
- Rabbi Avraham Yehoshua Heshel of Apt (1748–1825), the "Apter Rov" and founder of the Apt/Mezhbizh/Zinkover Chasidic rabbinic dynasty
- Micha Josef Berdyczewski (Micha Bin Goryon) (1865–1921), Hebrew author
- Joseph Barondess (1867–1928), after living with his wife in Medzhibozh, immigrated to the US in 1888 and became an important labor leader and politician

== Bibliography ==
- Chapin, David A. and Weinstock, Ben, The Road from Letichev: The history and culture of a forgotten Jewish community in Eastern Europe, Volume 1 and Volume 2. ISBN 0-595-00666-3 and ISBN 0-595-00667-1 iUniverse, Lincoln, NE, 2000.
- Rabinowicz, Tzvi M. The Encyclopedia of Hasidism: ISBN 1-56821-123-6 Jason Aronson, Inc., 1996.
- Rosman, Moshe, Founder of Hasidism: ISBN 0-520-20191-4 Univ. of California Press, 1996.
- Rosman, Moshe, "Miedzyboz and Rabbi Israel Baal Shem Tov", Zion, Vol. 52, No. 2, 1987, p. 177-89. Reprinted within Essential Papers on Hasidism ed, G.D. Hundert ISBN 0-8147-3470-7, New York, 1991.
- Rosman, Moshe, The Lords' Jews: Magnate-Jewish Relations in the Polish-Lithuanian Commonwealth during the Eighteenth Century, ISBN 0-916458-47-4 Cambridge, MA, 1990.
- Polyanker, Hirsh, Der lerer fun Medzshibozsh (Teacher from Medzhibozh, Учитель из Меджибожа), Moscow, 1982, LC Control No.: 83116737.
