= Isaac HaKohen Rapoport =

Isaac ben Judah Rapoport HaKohen (יצחק רפפורט הכהן) was an 18th-century rabbi who lived in Ottoman Empire; born and died at Jerusalem, a pupil of rabbi Hezekiah da Silva.

After a journey to Europe in behalf of the halukka fund, he was elected rabbi of Smyrna, where he remained forty years. At an advanced age he returned to Jerusalem, where he was appointed to a rabbinate.

He was the author of a work entitled Batei Kehunah (Hebrew: בתי כהונה, "Houses of the priesthood"). The first part contains responsa and treatises on the poskim (Smyrna, 1741); the second part consists of sermons, together with studies on the Talmud (Salonica, 1744).

== See also ==
- Rappaport

== Jewish Encyclopedia bibliography ==
- Fürst, Bibliotheca Judaica, iii. 130-131.
