= Rappaport family =

Kohanic rabbinic family

Rappaport family ראפאפארט (רפא מפורטו)
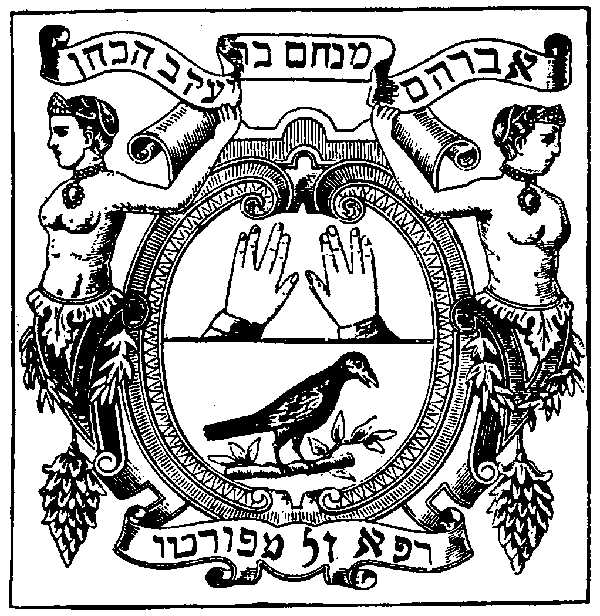
- Arms of the Rapoport family of Krotoschin
- Parent family: HaKohen family of Mainz (earlier HaKohen family of Nehar Pekod)
- Current region: North America and Israel
- Etymology: Rappa may derive from the Hebrew word רופא \ רוֹפֵא rofé "medical doctor, physician" or possibly from the older German word Rappe "raven" (modern High German: Rabe) and Porto being the town in Italy from where the family originated
- Origin: Porto, Mantua, Italy
- Founded: 1450; 576 years ago
- Founder: R. Meshulam Jekuthiel Rappa or Porto
- Traditions: Judaism
- Cadet branches: Rapoport-Bick

The Rappaport family (Hebrew: רפפורט; Yiddish: ראפאפארט) is a prominent Kohanic rabbinic family, who are generally considered to possess among the oldest and best recorded Kohanic pedigrees. The modern origins of the family can be traced back to R. Meshulam Jekuthiel HaKohen Rappa (d. 1450) who settled in Porto, Mantua, Italy after the Jews were expelled from his hometown of Mainz, Holy Roman Empire. From the 17th century and onward, the Rappaport family occupied some of the most prestigious rabbinic positions in Europe, specifically in Eastern Europe. The Rapoport-Bick rabbinic dynasty is a branch of the Rappaport family.

== History ==
By the middle of the 17th century, authors belonging to the Rappaport family were living in Poland and Lithuania, and were particularly concentrated in Krakow and Lviv; in the latter place, in 1584, was born the famous Talmudist R. Abraham Rappaport. By the late 17th-century members of the Rappaport family lived in Dubno and Krzemeniec, where they occupied the town's rabbinate. By the 18th-century members of the family began to immigrate out of Eastern Europe such as R. Isaac Rappaport who lived in Smyrna and later Jerusalem and R. Solomon Judah Loeb Rapoport lived in Moravia. R. Solomon's grandson Arnold Rappaport was a leader of the assimilationists in Galicia and was a deputy of the Austrian Reichsrat from 1879 to 1907 representing the Polish party. In 1890 he was ennobled, receiving the title "von Porada". About 1750 there were two members of the Rappaport family living in Dyhernfurth (Silesia): one named R. Israel Moses and the other R. Meïr; the former came from Pińczów, the latter from Krotoschin who received a Coat of Arms. Some members of the family became involved in the Haskalah such as Charles Rappoport, Shloyme Zanvl Rappoport and Emil Stanisław Rappaport. That being said, the family still continued to produce rabbis such as R. David Rappoport and more currently R. Chaim Rapoport and R. Gamliel Rabinowitz-Rappaport.

== External links and other articles ==
- Rapa: Elijah ben Menahem Rapa Elijah ben Menahem Rapa, or Elijah Rapaporto - Jewish Encyclopedia
- Portorapa: Simchah ben Gershon ha-Kohen Rapa (Portrapa) - Jewish Encyclopedia
- Rapa Porto: Menahem Abraham ben Jacob ha-Kohen Rapa (Porto); Menahem Rapoport - Jewish Encyclopedia
- The Center for the Study of the Rapaport Family
- Chapin, David A. and Weinstock, Ben, The Road from Letichev: The history and culture of a forgotten Jewish community in Eastern Europe, Volume 1. ISBN 0-595-00666-3 iUniverse, Lincoln, NE, 2000.
- Chabad.org What Does the Jewish Last Name Rapoport Mean?
