= Medzhybizh Fortress =

Coordinates: 49°26′11″N 27°24′44″E

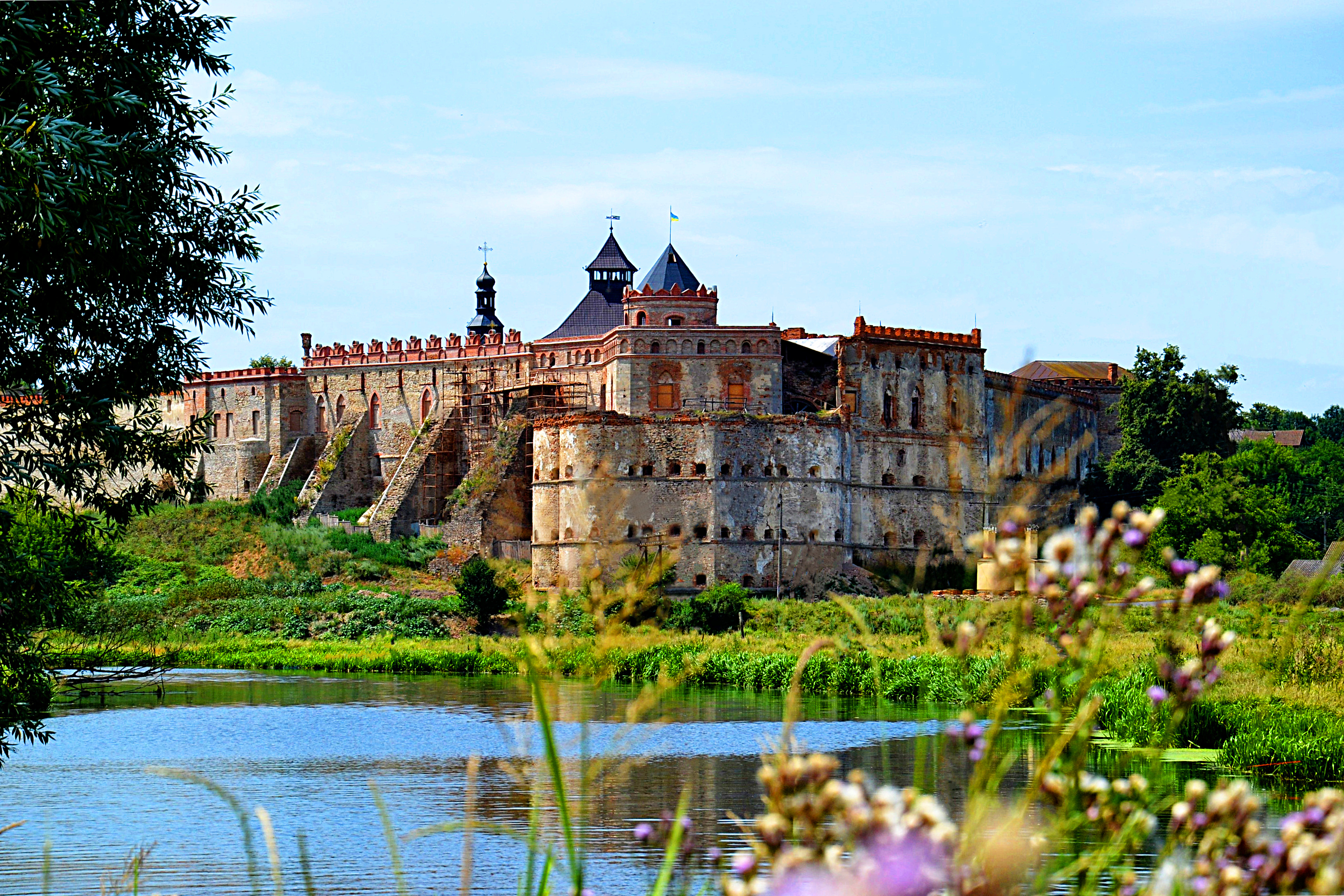
Medzhybizh castle

The Medzhybizh Fortress (Ukrainian: Меджибізька фортеця, romanized: Medzhybiz'ka fortetsya) also known as Medzhybizh Castle (Ukrainian: Меджибізький замок; Polish: Zamek w Międzybożu), is situated at the confluence of the Southern Bug and Buzhok rivers, in the town of Medzhybizh, Ukraine. Today the castle is part of the National Historical and Cultural Reserve.

== History of the place ==
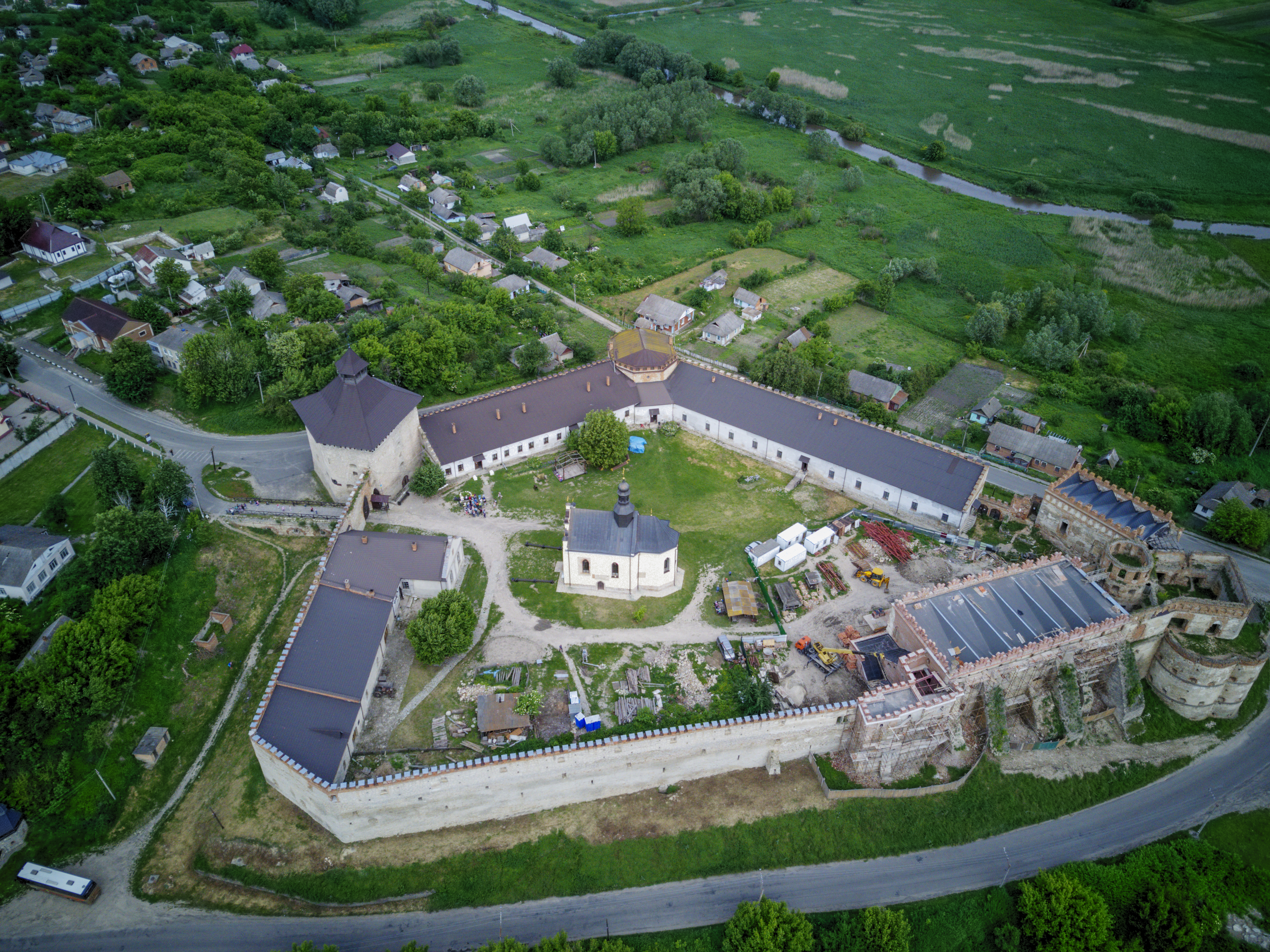
Medzhybizh castle, aerial view, 2019

The first fortification on a high cape located near the confluence of the Buzhok and Southern Bug rivers dates back to the period of Kievan Rus'. Medzhybizh town was first mentioned in historical chronicles in 1146, but archaeological findings on the territory of the castle show that the town existed much earlier. In the 13th century Medzhybizh was part of the Bolokhiv land, and at that time there was a wooden fort on this place. It was dismantled by Daniel of Galicia in 1255, who erected a new fortification in its place. However, the latter had to be dismantled on the order of Golden Horde khan Boroldai in 1258.

The first stone castle was built here during the time of the Grand Duchy of Lithuania (14th century), when the Koriat's owned the Podolia land. Some buildings of the Lithuanian period were preserved under the buildings of the following periods. Since 1540, Medzhybizh castle and town was the property of hetman Mikołaj Sieniawski (1489–1569) and his descendants. Then the size of the castle was increased to the perimeter of the modern territory. In 1672–1699, during the occupation of the Podolian Voivodeship by the Turks, the castle housed a Turkish garrison.

Since 1731, as a result of his marriage to Countess Maria Zofia Sieniawska, the castle became the property of prince August Aleksander Czartoryski and their descendants as part of the dowry. In the 18th century the castle lost its important military purpose and turned into one of the provincial residences of the Czartoryski family. In 1790–1791, Tadeusz Kosciuszko was the chief of the Medzhybizh garrison.

After the second division of the Polish-Lithuanian Commonwealth (1793) and the annexation of the Podolian Voivodeship, Medzhybizh passed to the Russian Empire, but remained the property of the Czartoryski family. In 1819, prince Adam Jerzy Czartoryski opened a school in the castle for children of the local nobility. For this, the castle was slightly rebuilt, as a result of which it acquired neo-Gothic stylistic features. For participation in the November Uprising of 1830–1831, the castle was confiscated along with all the Czartoryski estates.

Since 1848, Czartoryski castle was handed over to the Ministry of War of the Russian Empire. Under Russian rule, reconstruction works were performed at the castle under partonage of Alexandra Feodorovna, wife of Nicholas I of Russia, as a result of which the building attained Romantic and Gothic architecture. From 1896 to 1914, officers of the 12th “Okhtyrski” hussar regiment were stationed in Medzhybizh castle.

In 1917 Pavlo Skoropadsky's 1st Ukrainian Corps was stationed in Medzhybizh and had its training ground in the vicinity of the fortress. During the Soviet period, the castle was used for economic needs, and in the 1950s it was partly destroyed. In 1963, the castle was given the status of an architectural monument.

== List of landmarks ==
=== Palace ===
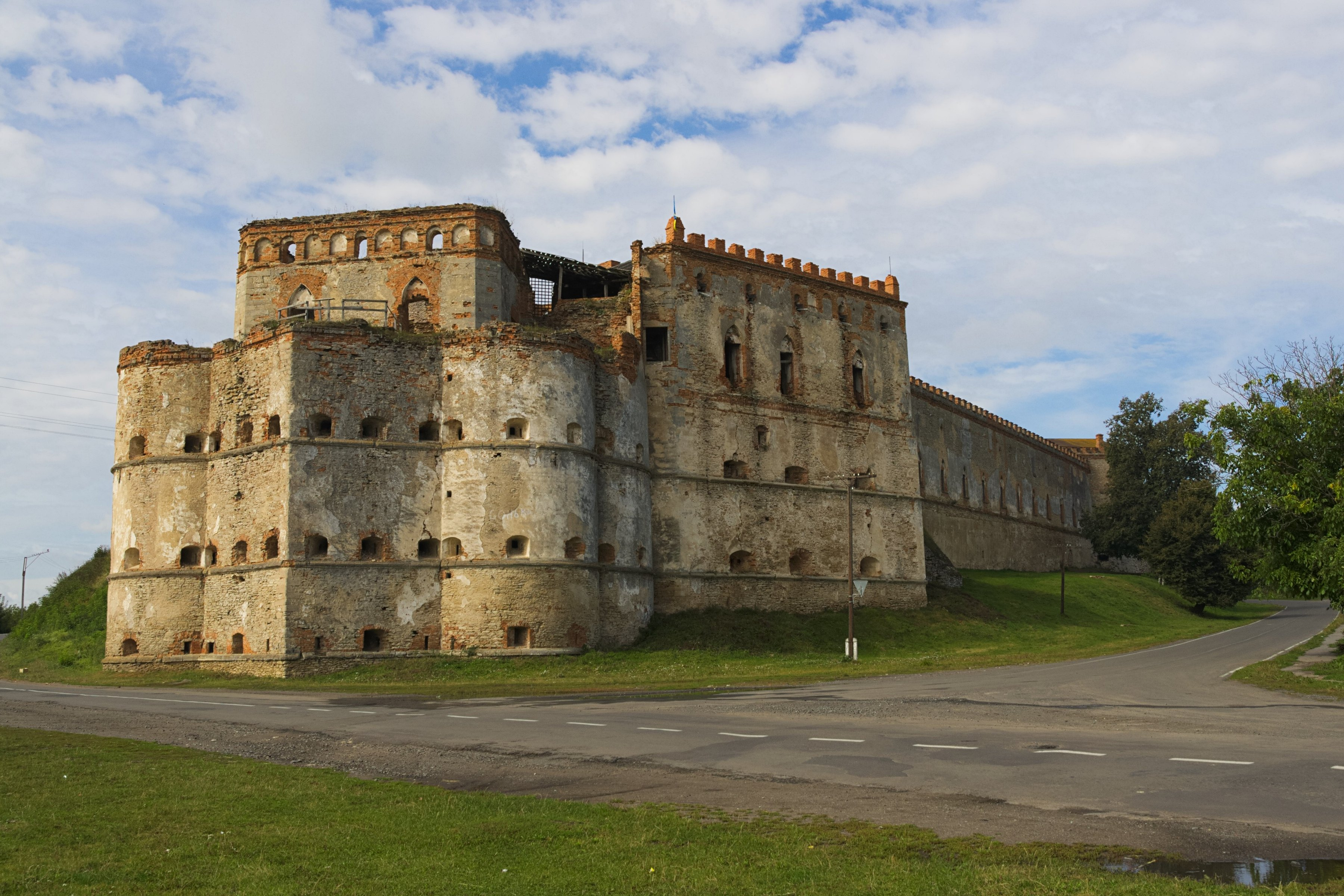
16th-century palace in Medzhybizh castle, 2013

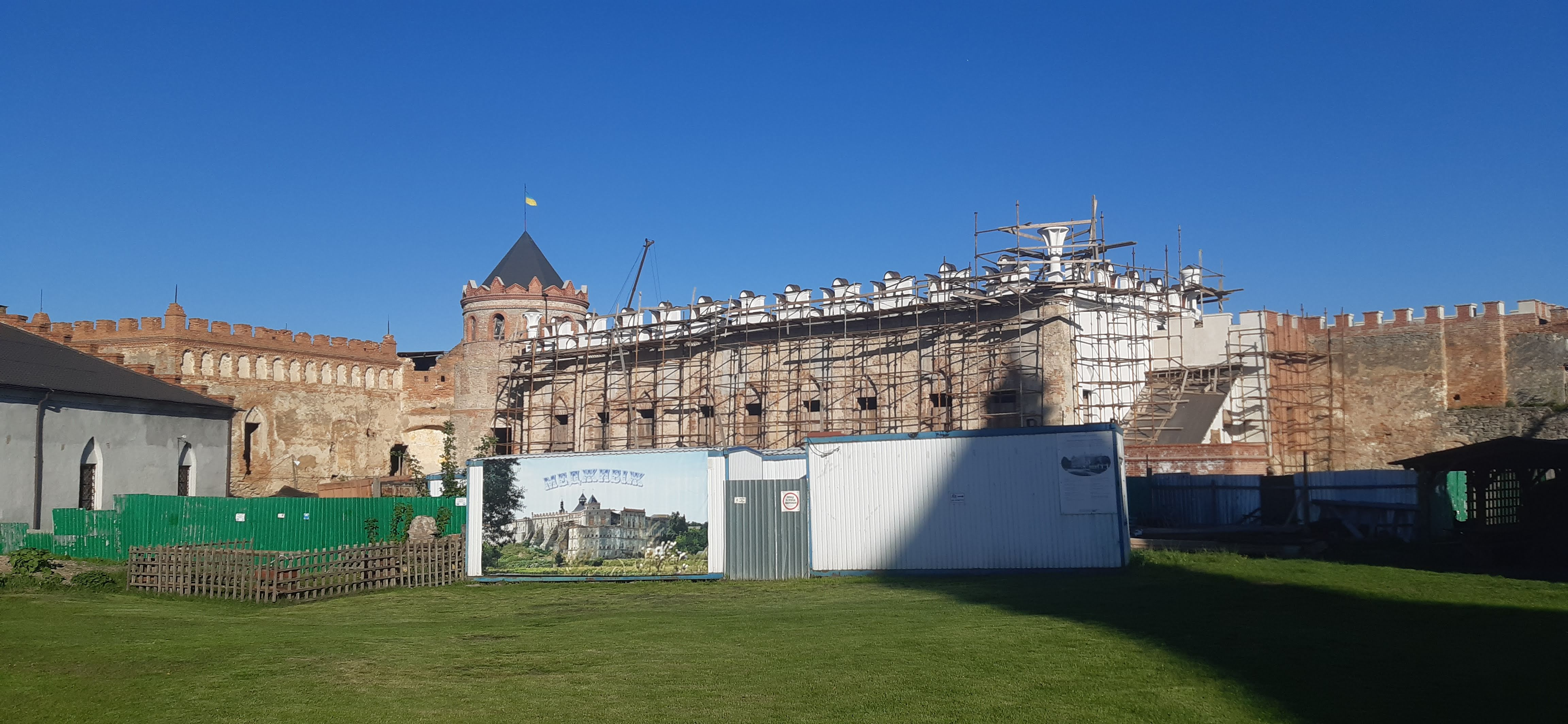
16th-century palace in Medzhybizh castle, 2022

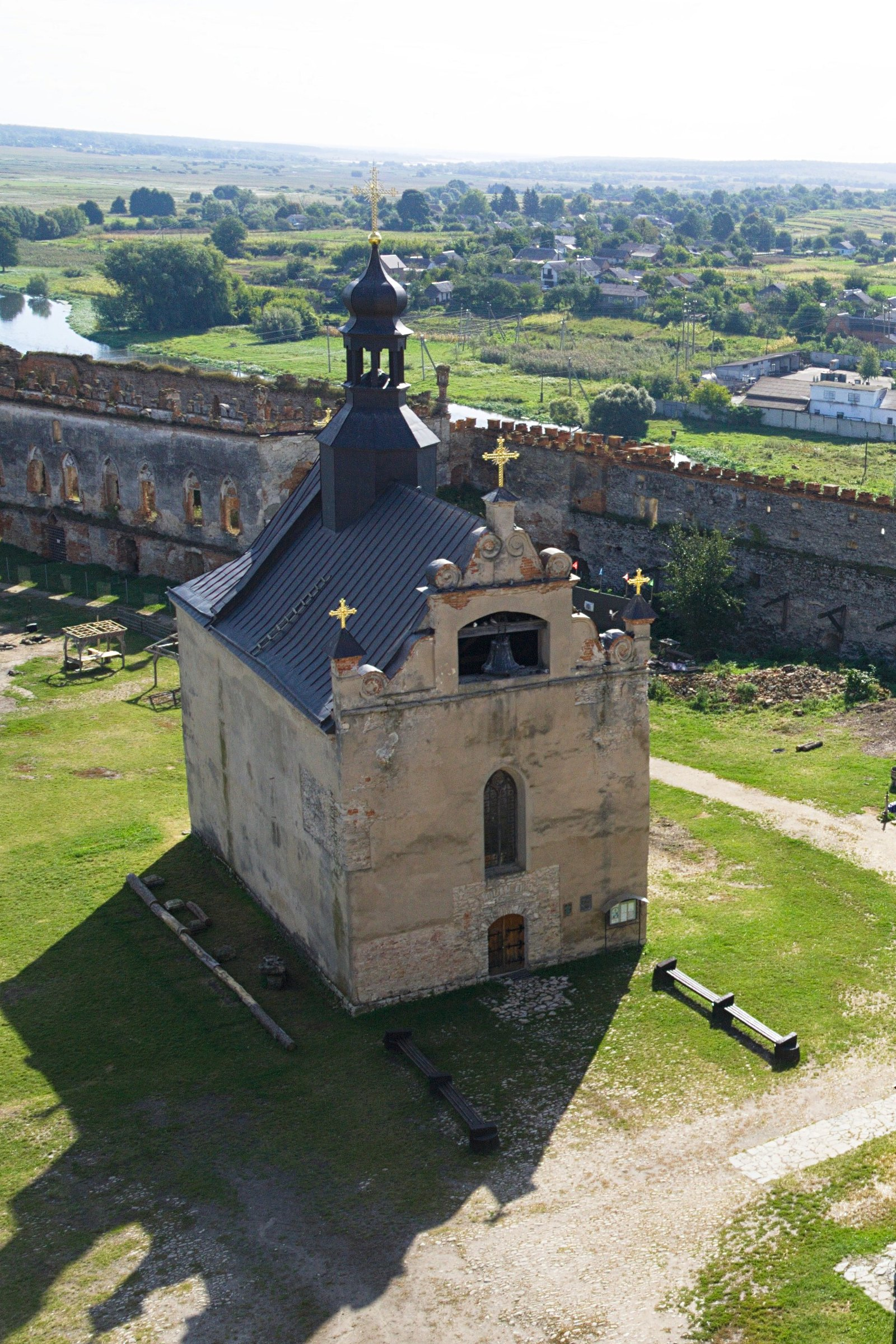
Church in Medzhybizh castle, 2013

The Palace of the Sieniawski and Czartoryiskyi families was built in the 16th century as a complex of residential, defense and economic buildings. The current palace in the Renaissance style was built over the previous buildings of the period of the Grand Duchy of Lithuania. From that time, the central tower (donjon), the barbican, part of the southern tower and the western wall, below ground level have survived. The palace complex also includes the eastern and western wings of the 16th–19th centuries, a three-tier bastion of the 16th century. The style of architectural decoration of the palace has analogues among the Renaissance palace buildings of South-Eastern Europe, in particular Slovakia. Since the most famous owner of Medzhybizh castle Mikołaj Sieniawski (1489–1569) was a Calvinist, the attic of the newly built palace contains characteristic symbols of Protestantism (stylized communion cups and others). The structure of the buildings preserved elements of the previous construction stages (before the 16th century). As a result of partial reconstruction in the 19th century the palace acquired Neo-Gothic architectural elements.

=== Church ===
The church of the 16th–19th centuries was built in 1586 (according to other sources in 1591) as the castle chapel of St. Stanisław in honor of the return of the Sieniawski family to Catholicism. During the Ottoman occupation (1662–1699) it was used as a mosque. In the second half of the 19th century, it was reformed into an Orthodox church for the military. In the Soviet period, before the monument status was granted, it was used for economic purposes. In 2005, the building was handed over to the Ukrainian Orthodox Church of the Kyiv Patriarchate and restored. Currently, the church operates as the Orthodox Church of Ukraine.

=== Fortifications ===
Include the walls and towers of 14th–19th centuries. The pentagonal tower named the Knight's Tower has four floors. It was built in the 16th century or earlier. The Officer's Tower has an octagonal shape. It was built of brick in the 18th and 19th centuries over an earlier stone roundel, with a castle well in its center. The southern rectangular tower (16th–19th centuries) contains a fragment of the half tower, which has been preserved from the time of the Grand Duchy of Lithuania (14th century). The southern curtain wall (16th–19th centuries) has embrasures for a four-tiered wooden battle parapet. In the western curtain wall from the 16th century there is a fortified gateway with an arched bridge over a dry moat. The bridge has one lifting section, which was raised by chains. The piers of the bridge stand on an earlier stone defensive structure, which is hidden under a layer of earth. The carriage house or stable, which is adjacent to the western curtain wall, had an economic purpose. Next to it is the residence of the commandant of the castle. Single-storey residential buildings dating from the 18th century adjoin the northern and northeastern curtain walls. Now there are museum exhibitions and service premises of the reserve.

== Notable people ==
- Mikołaj Sieniawski
- Bohdan Khmelnytsky
- August Aleksander Czartoryski
- Adam Jerzy Czartoryski
- Tadeusz Kościuszko
- Pavlo Skoropadskyi

== Historical and Cultural Reserve "Medzhybizh" ==
The first documentary mention of the museum in Medzhybizh castle dates in 1819 (the owner of the castle at that time was prince Adam Jerzy Czartoryski). The status of an architectural monument was assigned to Medzhybizh castle on March 26, 1963. Medzhybizh castle was entered into the category of "Landmarks and Architecture Monuments" of the State Register of National Cultural Heritage on July 2, 1999 (protection No. 746). In 1971, the first modern museum exhibition was opened as a department of the Khmelnytskyi Regional Museum of Local History. In 1997, it was reorganized into the Medzhybizh regional historical and ethnographic museum-fortress. In accordance with the resolution of the Cabinet of Ministers of Ukraine dated 27.12.2001, the State Historical and Cultural Reserve “Mezhybizh” was created. In fact, the reserve started its activities in 2003. The name of the reserve "Mezhybizh" (without the letter d) corresponds to the name of the town of Kievan Rus' times: "Mezhybozhe". Since 2020, Medzhybizh Castle has been an associate member of the European Cultural Route of FORTE CULTURA e.V. In April 2022, at the annual international conference in Terezin, Medzhybizh Castle was granted the status of official stop on the European Cultural Route FORTE CULTURA.

== Activities ==
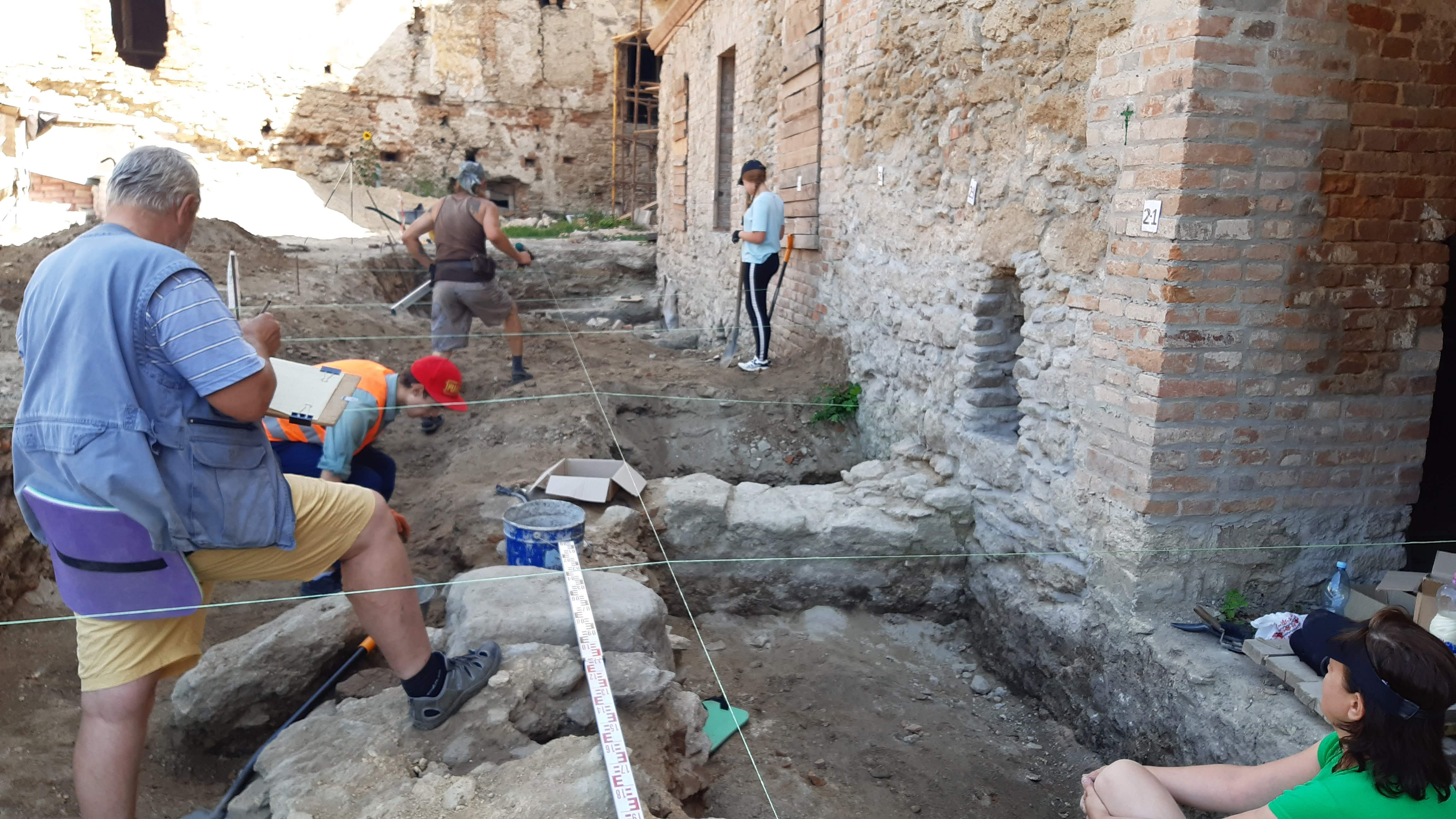
Archaeological excavations in Medzhybizh castle, 2020

Since 2009, scientific and local history conferences "Ancient Medzhybizh in the historical and cultural heritage of Ukraine" have been held annually in the reserve "Mezhybizh", since 2011 "Archaeological readings" have been held annually, since 2015 international archaeological conferences have been held once every 2 years together with Institute of Archaeology of the National Academy of Sciences of Ukraine. Since 2002, annual festivals of historical reconstruction have been held. Since 2015, the annual "Night of Museums in Medzhybizh castle" events have been held here. Since 2016, the international volunteer archaeological camp "Medieval bastion" has been operating annually. The reserve publishes the journal "Scientific Bulletin 'Mezhybizh'", the book series "Archaeological Studies 'Mezhybizh'", other publications.

== Gallery ==
Views of the fortress

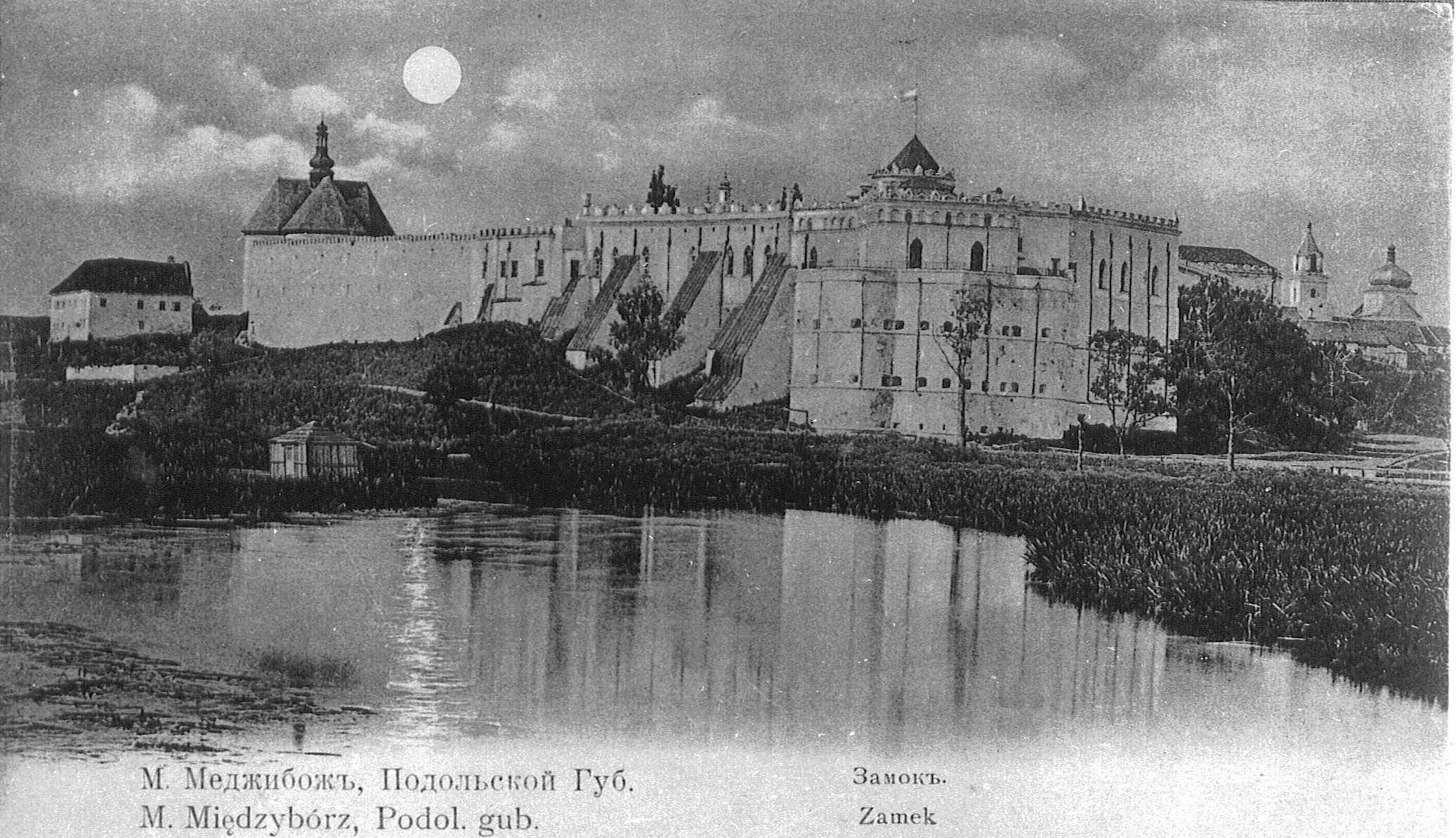
Międzybuż on a 1900 postcard

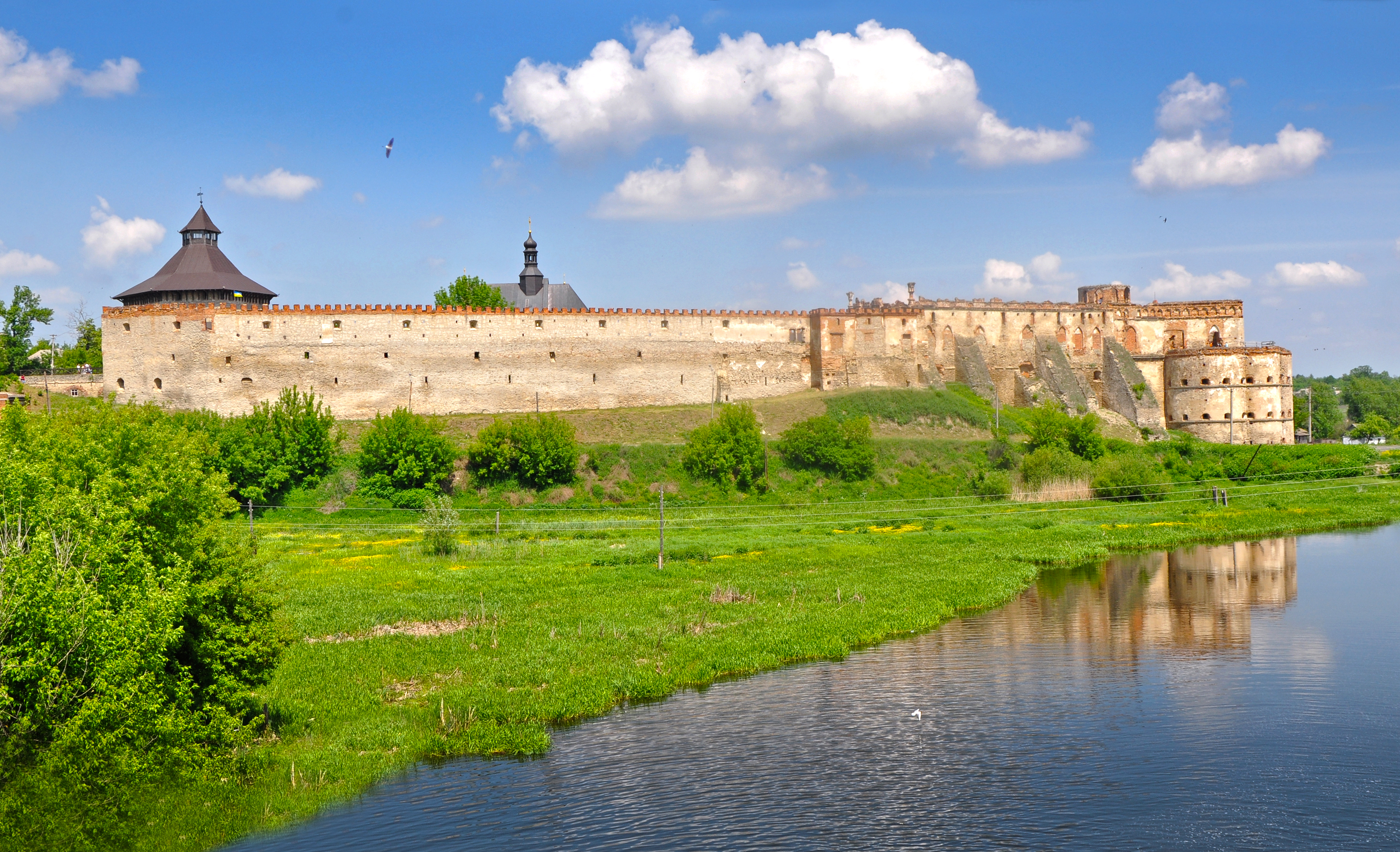
The wall

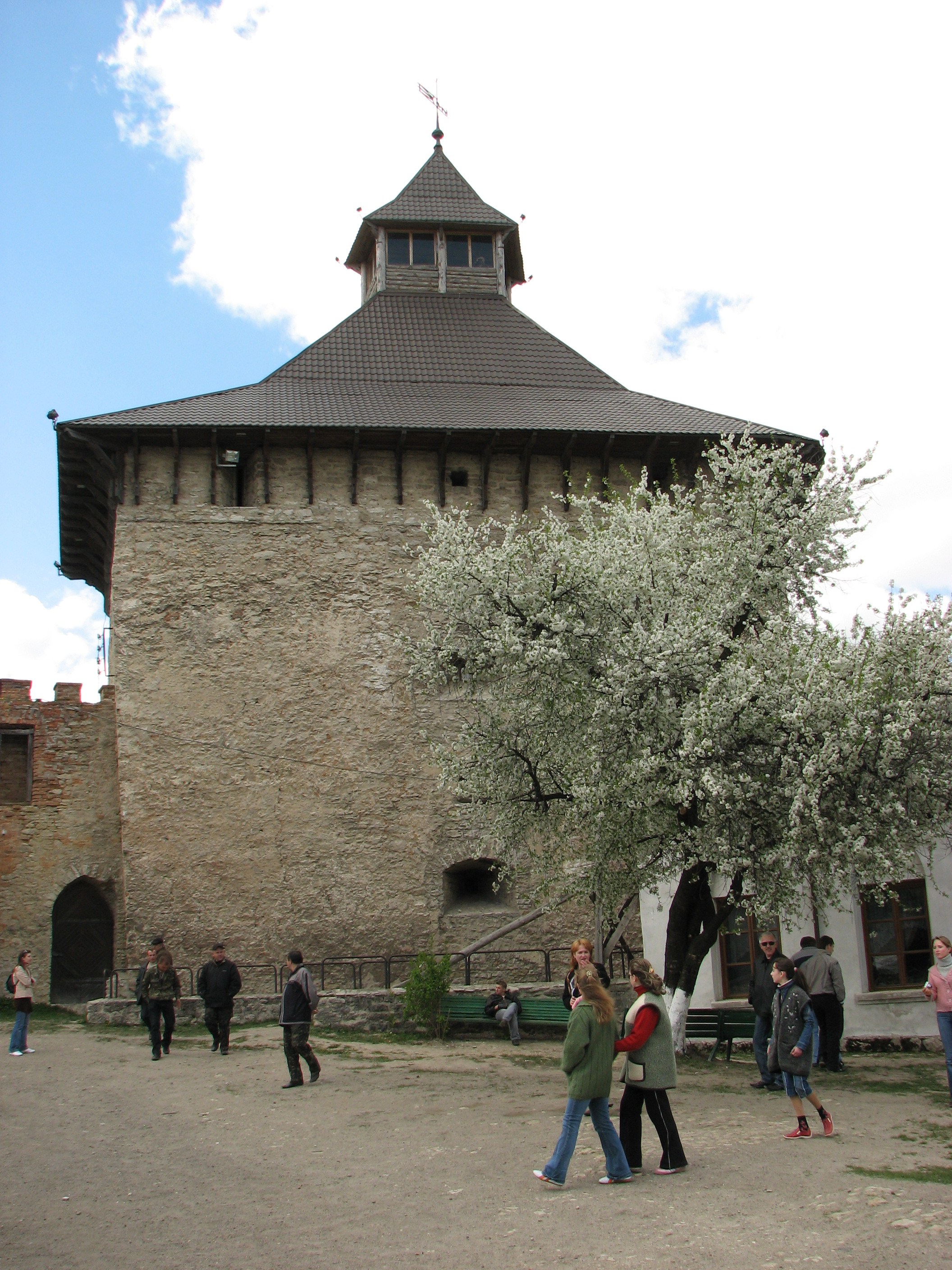
One of the castle's four towers

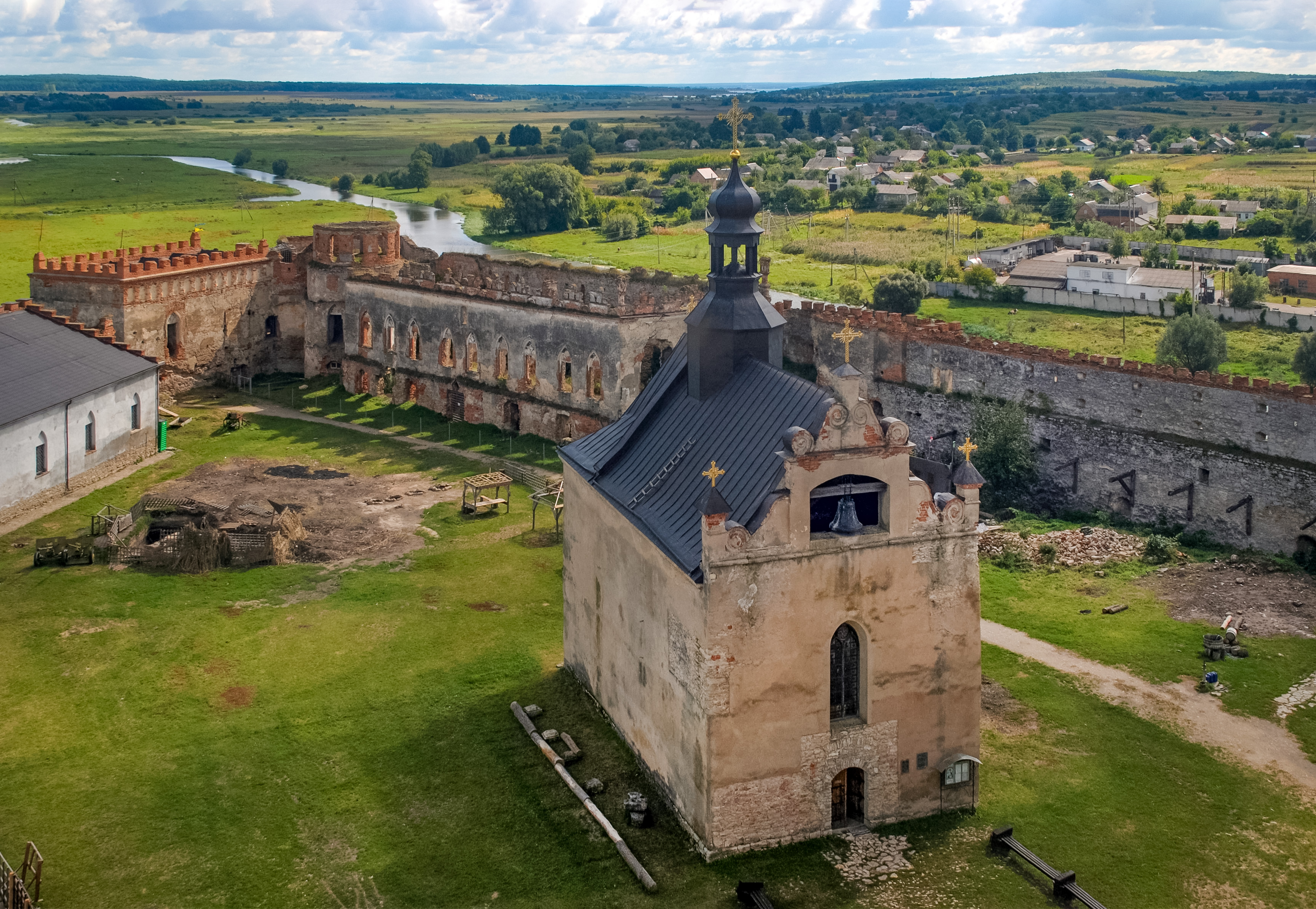
St. Nicholas Church

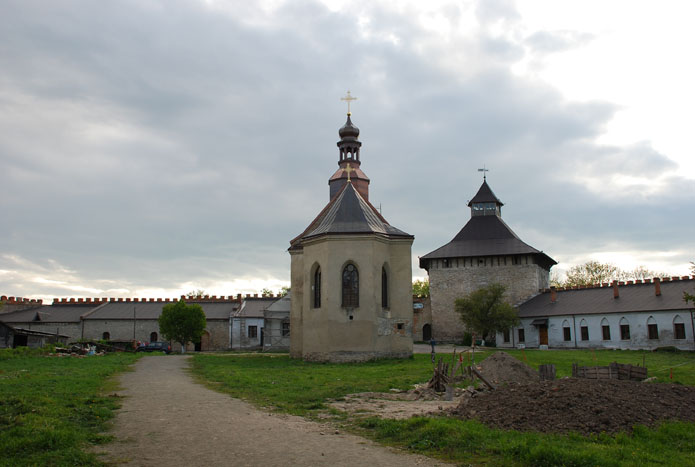
A restored 16th-century church
