= Avraham Yehoshua Heshel =

Polish rabbi (1748–1825)

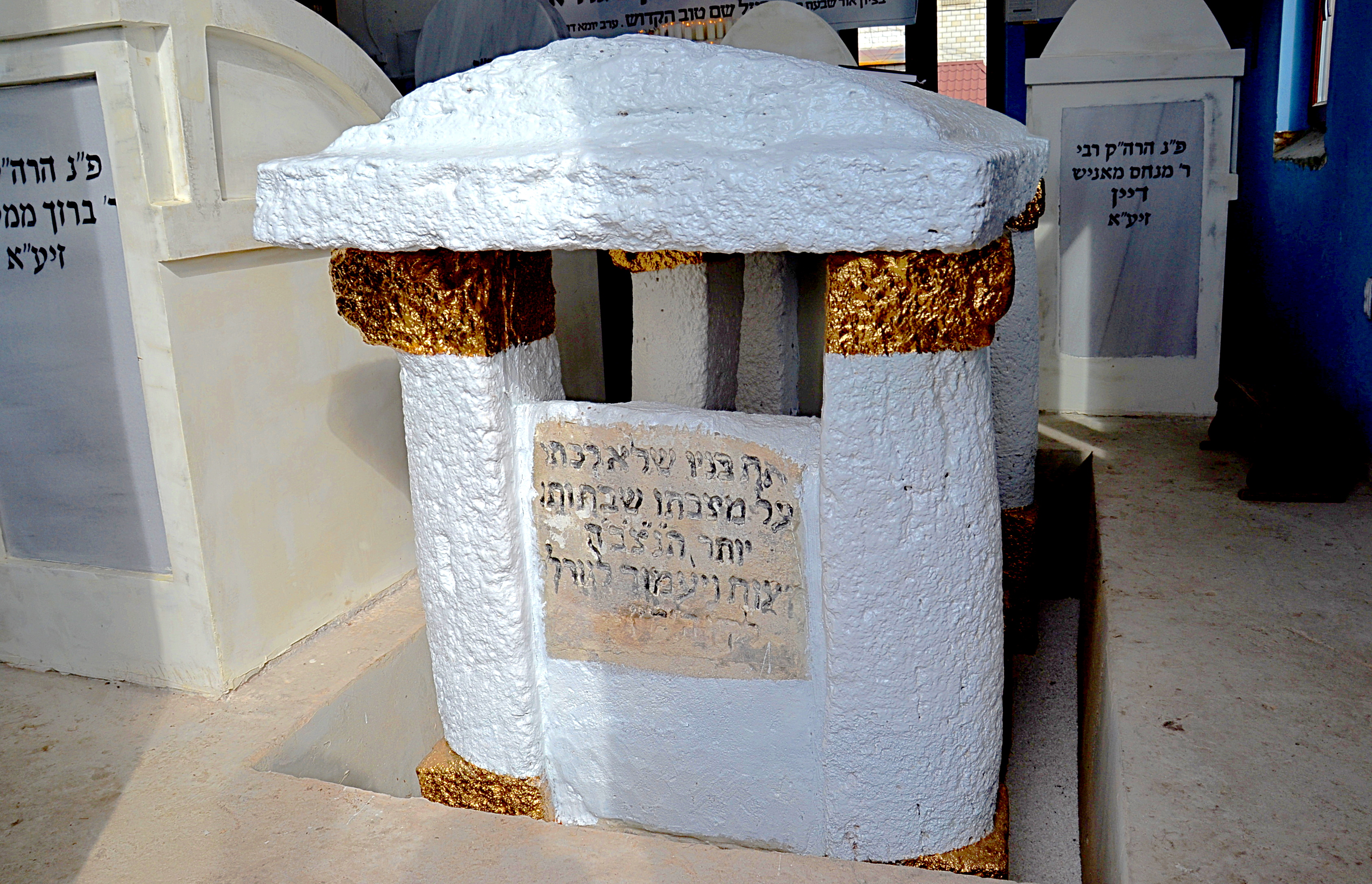
- Kever of Avraham Yehoshua Heshel in Medzhybizh
- Title: Apter Rebbe / Rov

Personal life
- Born: רבי אברהם יהושע העשיל; Avraham Yehoshua Heshel; 1748 Żmigród
- Died: 5 Nisan 1825 Medzhybizh
- Buried: Medzhybizh
- Spouse: Chaya Sara
- Children: R. Yitschok Meir of Zinkiv (1776-1854); R. Yosef Moshe of Medzhybizh; Yocheved (m. Don Yingerleib); Dina ?? (m. Mordechai Orenstein), Rachel Ashkenazi
- Parents: R. Shmuel of Neustadt (father); Batsheva Halperin of Lublin (mother)
- Dynasty: Apt

Religious life
- Religion: Judaism

Jewish leader
- Predecessor: (founder of dynasty)
- Successor: R. Yitschok Meir of Zinkіv (1776-1854)
- Main work: אוהב ישראל Oheiv Yisrael
- Dynasty: Apt

Avraham Yehoshua Heshel of Apt, popularly known as the Apter Rebbe or Apter Rov, was born in Żmigród, Poland in 1748 and died in Mezhbizh, Russian Empire (now Ukraine) in 1825.

== Rabbinical career ==
A scion of famous rabbinic families, on both his father's and his mother's side (his family can be traced back to Maharam Padua and Saul Wahl), Avraham Yehoshua Heshel showed great promise even at an early age. Acquiring fame as a talmudic scholar, he studied under Rabbi Elimelech of Lizhensk and Rabbi Yechiel Michel of Zlotshov. Becoming one of the foremost spokesmen of the growing Chasidic movement in Poland, he began his career as Rabbi of Kolbuszowa. In 1800 he accepted the post of Rabbi of Apt, or Opatów. Although he held many other rabbinic positions, to the chasidim he remained always the Apter Rov. In 1808 he was chosen as Rabbi of Iaşi, Moldavia. In the wake of communal strife there, he was forced to leave his post and settled in Mezhbizh, the home of the Baal Shem Tov and the cradle of Hasidism, where he devoted himself completely to the study and dissemination of Chasidism.

It was during his years in Medzhybizh that Avraham Yehoshua Heshel gained a substantial following, which included several prominent rabbis of his time. He became widely known by the title Ohev Yisrael ("Lover of Israel"), reflecting his emphasis on love and compassion toward the Jewish people.

His principal work, Ohev Yisrael, is a collection of his teachings arranged according to the weekly Torah portions. The work contains Hasidic and Kabbalistic interpretations and is regarded as one of the foundational texts of Hasidic literature. The themes of love, compassion, and concern for fellow Jews are prominent throughout the work and have been identified by scholars as central to his teachings. Within the Hasidic tradition, the Apter Rov is regarded as one of its leading spiritual figures.

On his deathbed, crying bitterly over the long exile, he said: "Before his demise, Rabbi Levi Yitzchak of Berdichev promised that upon entering the World-to-Come he would not rest or sit until Mashiach would come. But they diverted his attention by teaching him lofty and mystical concepts until he forgot his pledge—but I assure you, I will not forget."

He was buried in Mezhbizh, near the Baal Shem Tov. An ornate stone ohel marks his grave in the old Jewish cemetery. According to one Hasidic legend, angels subsequently carried his body and buried him in the Holy Land, and in the Jewish Cemetery in Tiberias there is a stone marking his supposed grave.

== The Hasidic dynasty of Mezhbizh/Zinkov ==
Rabbi Avraham Yehoshua Heshel of Apt was the founder of the Mezhbizh/Zinkover rabbinic dynasty. In honor of the dynasty's founder, his descendants adopted the family name Heshel.
