= Apta (Hasidic dynasty) =

Polish Hasidic dynasty

Apta-Zinkov-Mezibuz Hasidic Dynasty
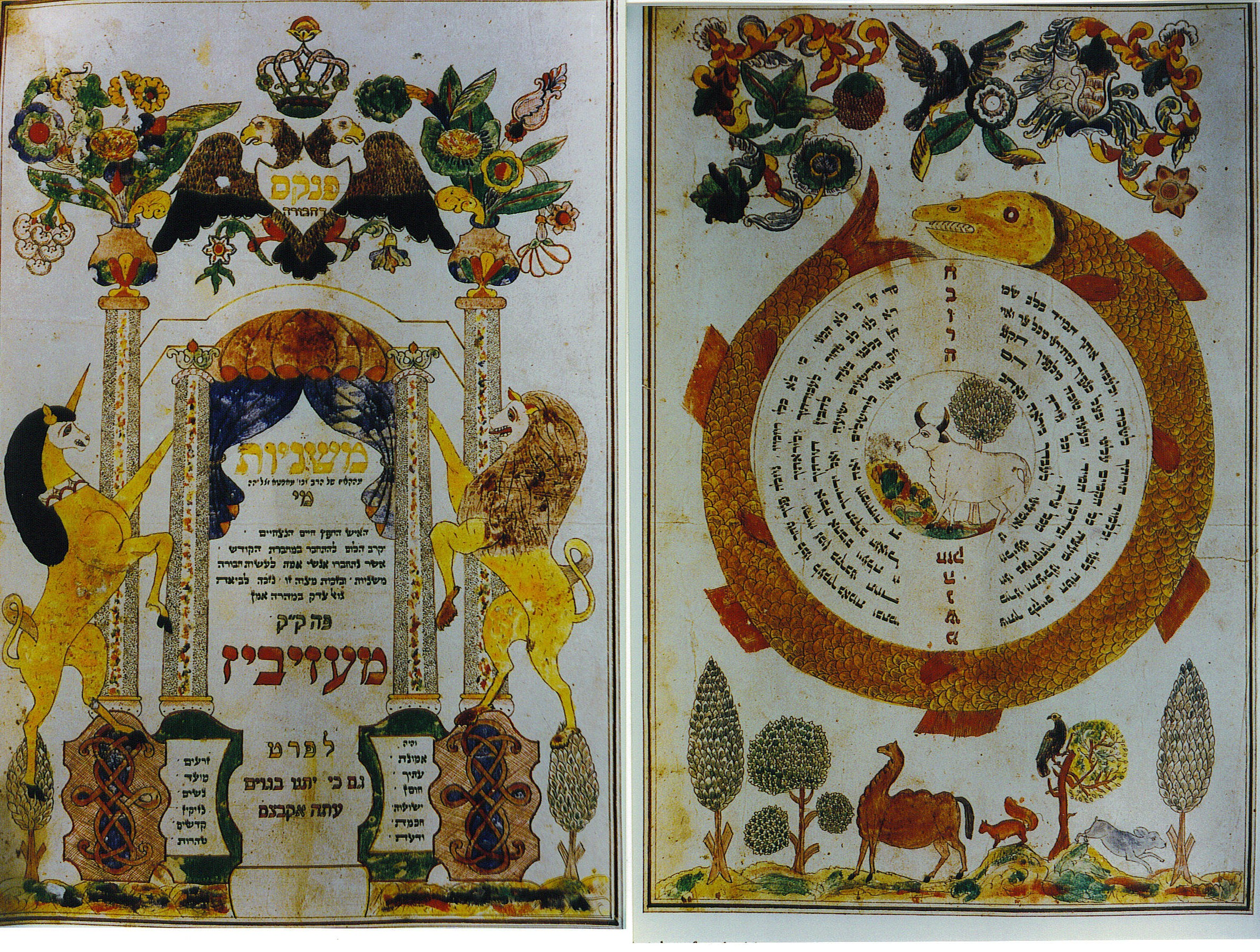
- Illuminated pages from the pinkas ("minutes") books of the Mishnah Society of the Apter Rov's kloyz, Medzhybizh, circa 1840.

Founder
- Rabbi Avraham Yehoshua Heshel of Apta

Regions with significant populations
- Israel, United States, Poland

Religions
- Hasidic Judaism

Languages
- Yiddish, Hebrew

Related ethnic groups
- Ruzhin, Kopychyntsi

The Apta-Zinkov-Mezibuz dynasty is a Polish Hasidic dynasty founded by Rabbi Avraham Yehoshua Heshel of Apta (popularly known as the "Apter Rov").

== History ==
Rabbi Avraham Yehoshua Heshel of Apta was born in 1748 to Rabbi Shmuel and was the son-in-law of Rabbi Ya'akov of Tortshin. He was one of the greatest disciples of Rabbi Elimelech of Lizhensk.

== Lineage ==
Rabbi Avraham Yehoshua Heshel of Apt was the founder of the Apt-Mezhbizh-Zinkover Hasidic dynasty. In honor of the dynasty's founder, his descendants adopted the family name Heshel.

The males in this family took wives several different times from the family of the Ryzhiner Rebbe.

- R. Avraham Yehoshua Heshel of Apt (1748–1825)
  - R. Yitschak Meir of Zinkov (1776-1854)
  - R. Yosef Moshe of Mezhbizh
    - R. Meshulam Zusia of Zinkov (1813-1865)
      - R. Chaim Menachem of Zinkov (1837-1894)
        - R. Pinchas of Zinkov (1872-1916)
          - R. Abraham Joshua Heshel of Zinkov
        - R. Moses of Zinkov (1879-1923)
          - R. Chaim Menachem of Zinkov-Bnei Brak
      - R. Abraham Joshua Heshel of Mezhbizh (1832-1881)
        - R. Israel Shalom Joseph of Mezhbizh (1853-1911)
          - R. Yitshak Meir of Mezhbizh-Haifa (1904-1985)
          - R. Abraham Joshua Heshel of Mezhbizh-Tarnopol (1892-1943)
        - R. Yitshak Meir of Kopyczynce (1862-1936)
          - R. Abraham Joshua Heshel of Kopyczynce (1888-1967). His daughter Chava was married to Shneur Zalman Gurary, a chassid of the last two Lubavitcher Rebbes. Their son, Itche Meir Gurary, was asked by some Kopyczyncer chassidim to become a Kopyczyncer Rebbe. However, he chose to remain as mashpia in Tomchei Tmimim of Montreal.
            - R. Moshe Mordechai Heschel of Kopyczynce (1927-1975) succeeded his father as rebbe, and was renowned for his legendary kindness. He died suddenly of a cerebral hemorrhage.
              - R. Yekusiel Zishe Heschel, second son of r. Moshe Mordechai, is the current Kapitshnitzer Rebbe, and is a greatly respected Torah scholar and tzaddik.
            - R. Meshulam Zusia Heschel, the youngest son of R. Abraham Joshua Heschel. His daughter, Shoshana Bluma Reizel, is married to Rabbi Nachum Dov Brayer.
              - R. Yitzchak Meir Flintenstein, grandson of Reb Abraham Joshua Heschel is currently the Kapishnitz-Yerushalayim Rebbe. He is known to be an original thinker, and is one of the foremost authorities on chassidism's thinking and history.
        - R. Meshulam Zusia of Mezhbizh (1871-1920)
        - R. Moses Mordecai of Mezhbizh and Pelzovizna, Warsaw (1873-1916)
          - Rabbi Abraham Joshua Heschel (January 11, 1907, Warsaw, Poland – December 23, 1972), Professor of Jewish Ethics and Mysticism at Jewish Theological Seminary of America (JTS), the main rabbinical school of Conservative Judaism. He was an author, civil rights activist, and leader in the Conservative movement.
            - Prof. Susannah Heschel (born 1952), Professor of Jewish Studies at Dartmouth College.
