= Rapoport-Bick (rabbinic dynasty) =

Ukrainian Jews

The Rapoport-Bick dynasty was a non-chasidic rabbinic dynasty of Medzhybizh, in Ukraine.

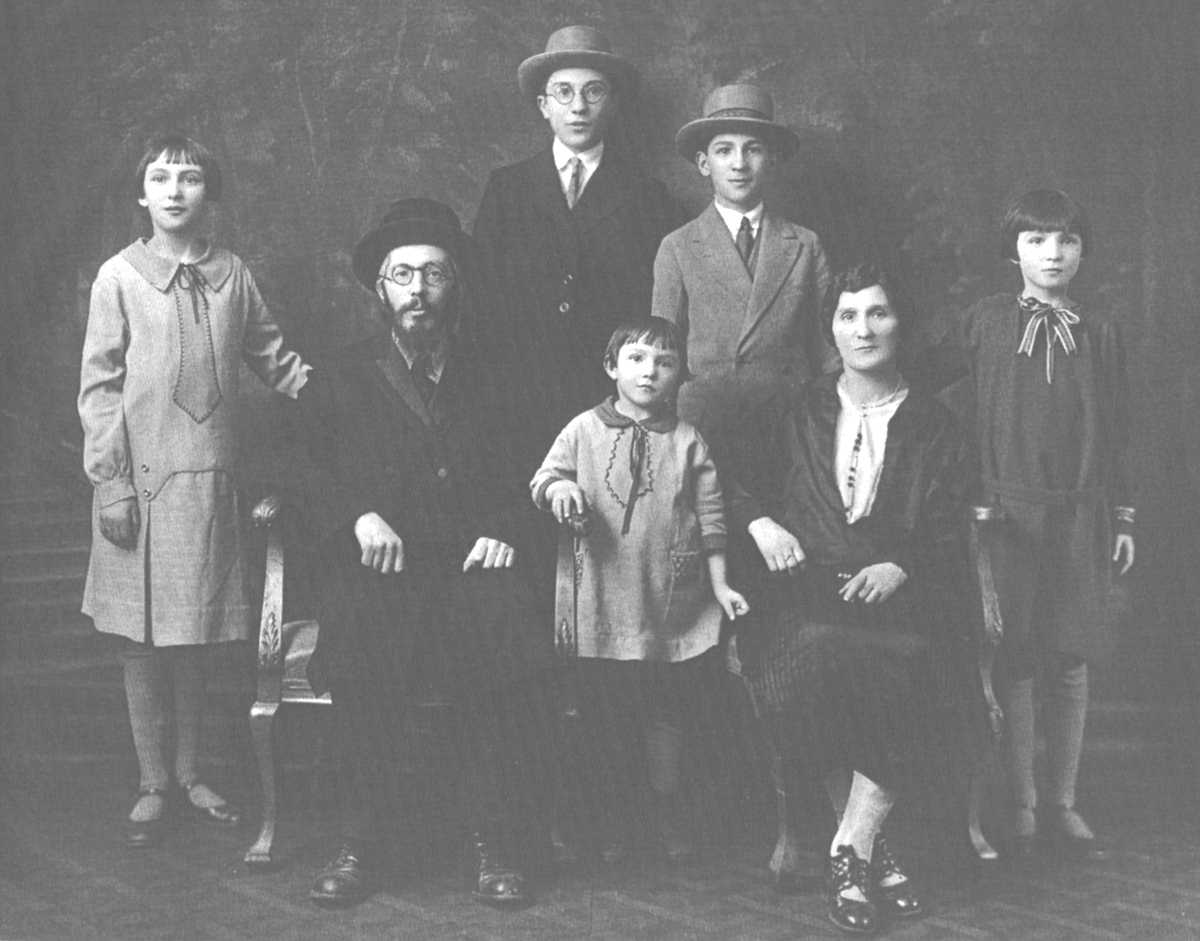
Rabbi Chaim Yekhiel Mikhel Bick (1887-1964), seated, surrounded by his family in 1926. He was the last rabbi of any type to practice in Medzhybizh. Standing to the right of him is his son Moshe Tsvi who also became a rabbi.

The first Rapoport rabbi to make his home in Medzhybizh was Rabbi Dov Berish Rapoport (d. 1823). He was the grandson of Rabbi Khaim haCohen Rapoport of Lvov (d. 1771), who was also involved in the Frankist debates. Rabbi Dov Berish became the head of the Jewish court (Av Beit Din) and spiritual leader of the entire Jewish community of Medzhybizh. However, in a dispute with Rabbi Moshe Khaim Ephraim, the Baal Shem Tov's grandson, around the year 1800, the non-Chasidic and the Chasidic communities separated into two groups. The Rapoport-Bick family continued to control the town's Jewish court. The Chasidic community at the time chose Rabbi Issachar Dov-Ber Landa to represent them in official matters. Both Rabbis Rapoport and Landa are buried side by side in the Medzhybizh Jewish Cemetery, just a few steps away from the Baal Shem Tov's grave.

The Bick family were responsible for the official religious "business" of the community, such as relations with the Russian authorities and kashrut rulings. They were based out of R. Joel Sirkes' synagogue in Medzhybizh - the town shul. The name, BICK, is an acronym in Hebrew for "Defender of the Faith." Other members of the family included R. Isaac Bick who was the head of the Beit Din in Medzhybizh until 1902 when he left for Rhode Island by way of Hester St. in NY City. His two eldest sons also became rabbis, Shoul (Shaul) in Brooklyn, and Haym (Herman)in Massachusetts. There are still rabbis of the Bick family today who have congregations in Brooklyn and in Israel.

The last rabbi of any type to live in Medzhybizh was Rabbi Chaim Yechiel Mikhl Bick (1887–1964). He left in 1925 for New York.

== Bibliography ==
Chapin, David A. and Weinstock, Ben, The Road from Letichev: The history and culture of a forgotten Jewish community in Eastern Europe, Volume 1. ISBN 0-595-00666-3 iUniverse, Lincoln, NE, 2000.
