= Nachum Dov Brayer =

Boyaner Rebbe (born 1959)

Nachum Dov Brayer נחום דב ברייר
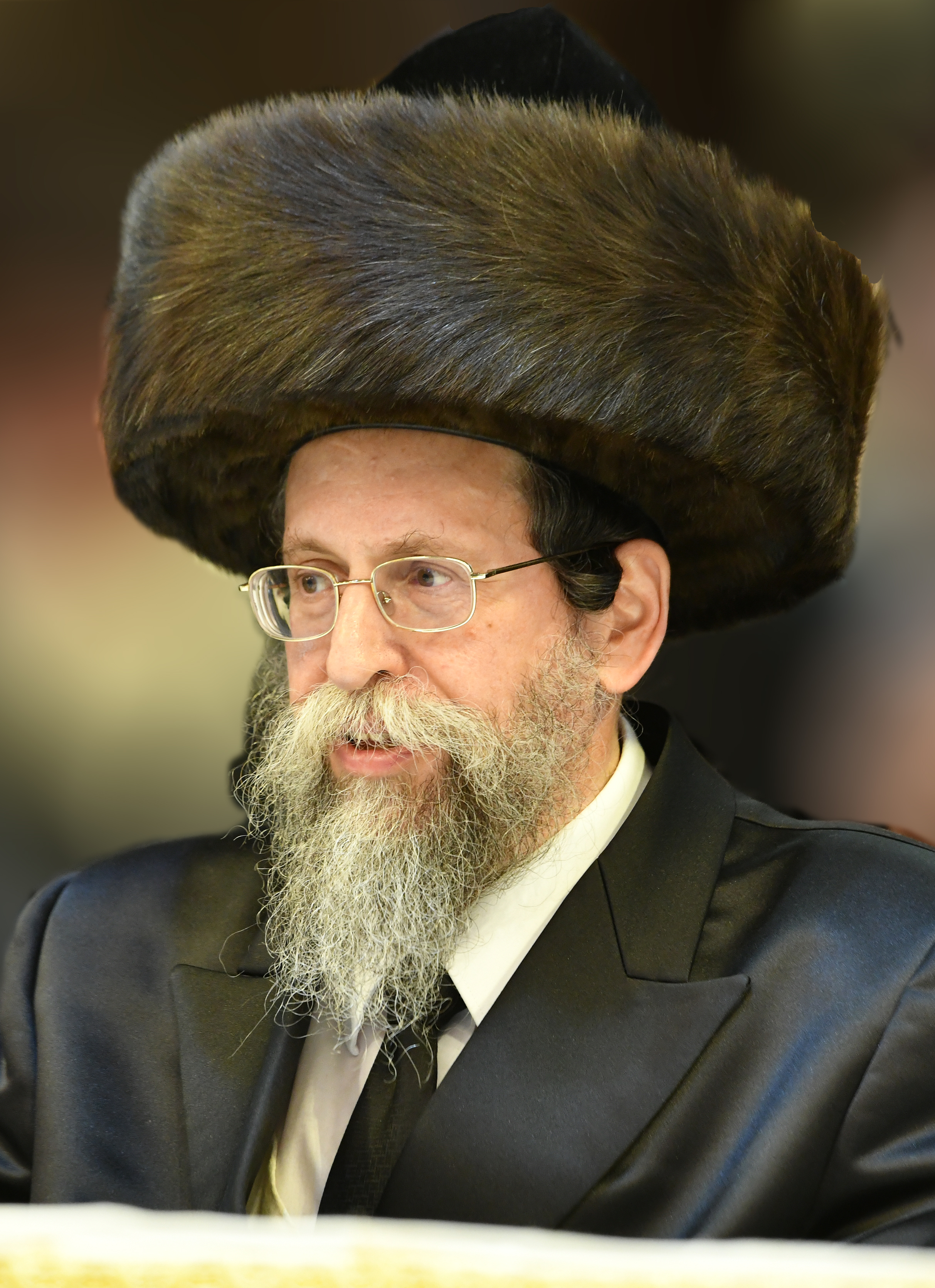
- Title: Boyaner Rebbe

Personal life
- Born: Nachum Dov Brayer; April 15, 1959 (age 67) New York City, U.S.
- Spouse: Shoshana Bluma Reizel Heschel
- Parents: Rabbi Menachem Mendel Brayer (father); Malka Friedman (mother)
- Dynasty: Boyan

Religious life
- Religion: Judaism

Jewish leader
- Predecessor: Rabbi Mordechai Shlomo Friedman
- Began: 1984
- Ended: present
- Dynasty: Boyan

Nachum Dov Brayer (Hebrew: נחום דב ברייר; born April 15, 1959) is the Rebbe of the Boyan Hasidic dynasty. He is the grandson of the former Boyaner Rebbe of New York, Rabbi Mordechai Shlomo Friedman. On Hanukkah 1984, at the age of 25, he was crowned Boyaner Rebbe. He lives in Jerusalem.

== Biography ==
The Rebbe's father, Rabbi Menachem Mendel Brayer (1922–2007), was an academic researcher, student psychologist, and lecturer in Bible, education, and Jewish philosophy at Yeshiva University. His mother, Malka (1923–August 31, 2012), was the only daughter of the Boyaner Rebbe of New York. On his mother's side, Nachum Dov is the great-grandson of the founder of Boyaner Hasidut, Rabbi Yitzchok Friedman (also known as the Pachad Yitzchok), a son of the first Sadigura Rebbe, Rabbi Avrohom Yaakov Friedman, and a grandson of the founder of Ruzhiner Hasidut, Rabbi Yisroel of Ruzhin. He has a brother, Yigal Yisroel Avrohom, and a sister, Nechama Chaya, wife of Rabbi Gedalyah Block.

When the Boyaner Rebbe of New York died of a stroke on March 2, 1971, the Boyaner Hasidim were left leaderless. They asked the Rebbe's eldest son, Yisroel, to become the next Rebbe, but he declined. The Hasidim then asked the Rebbe's daughter Malka and her husband, Rabbi Dr. Brayer, to offer one of their two young sons for the leadership. The eldest, Yigal, who was studying to be an aerospace engineer, was suggested and then rejected. The lot fell to the younger son, Nachum Dov, who originally studied at Yeshiva Rabbi Samson Raphael Hirsch in Washington Heights & Yeshiva Chasan Sofer in Brooklyn then enrolled at the Ruzhiner Yeshiva in Jerusalem to prepare himself for the task.

Over the years, Brayer was subjected to intense pressure to accept the mantle of leadership, even though he preferred to join a kollel and dedicate his life to Torah study. Rabbi Menachem Mendel Schneerson of Lubavitch, Rabbi Yisrael Alter of Ger, and Rabbi Moshe Feinstein were among those who prevailed upon him to accept the position, while Boyaner Hasidim kept reminding him of the great moral responsibility he had to keep the dynasty going. Finally he agreed, and on Hanukkah 1984, at the age of 25, he was declared Boyaner Rebbe.

== Current activities ==
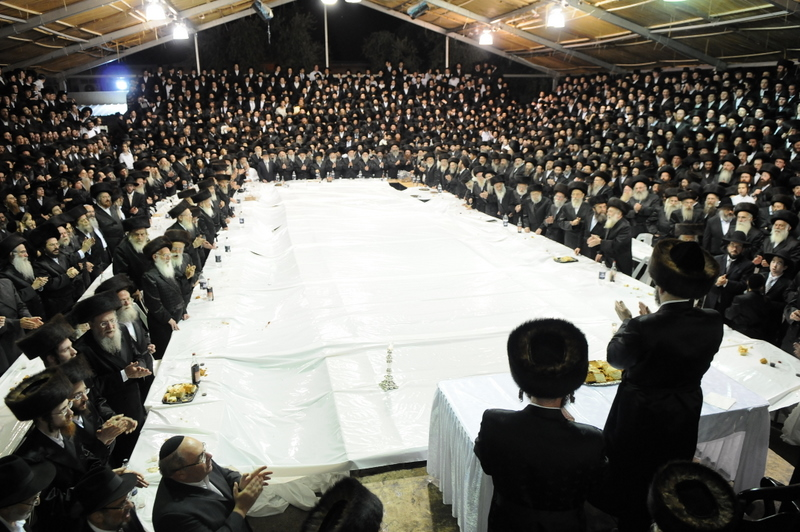
The Rebbe leads a tish in the giant sukkah erected at Yeshivat Tiferes Yisroel, 2009.

The Rebbe is the leader of more than 5,000 Boyaner Hasidim, making Boyan the largest of the Ruzhiner dynasties (the others are Sadigura, Bohush, Chortkov, Husiatyn, Kapishnitz, Vasloi and Shtefanesht). The Rebbe serves as president of the Ruzhiner Yeshiva now in Modiin Illit, and has built new Boyaner yeshivas and kollels in Israel, Europe and the United States. In Israel, he encouraged the opening of Boyaner batei medrash (study halls) in young communities such as Ramat Shlomo, Ramot, Kiryat Sefer and Beitar Ilit. He does not comment on Israeli politics.

Being led by an American-born Rebbe, the Hasidut attracts many American students learning in nearby yeshivas. Over the years, these students have been invited to join the Rebbe and his family for the third Shabbat meal.

The Boyaner Rebbe traditionally lights the first bonfire at the annual Lag BaOmer celebration at the tomb of Rabbi Shimon Bar Yochai in Meron, Israel. This privilege was purchased by Rabbi Avrohom Yaakov Friedman, the first Sadigura Rebbe, from the Sephardi guardians of Meron and Safed; the Sadigura Rebbe bequeathed this honor to his eldest son, Rabbi Yitzchok, the first Boyaner Rebbe, and his progeny. The first hadlakah (lighting) is attended by hundreds of thousands of people each year; in 2001, the crowd was estimated at 300,000.

== Family ==
Brayer married Shoshana Bluma Reizel Heschel (born October 16, 1960), daughter of Rabbi Meshulam Zusia Heschel and granddaughter of Rabbi Abraham Joshua Heschel of Kopyczynce (1888–1967). They have five sons and five daughters.

== See also ==
- Ruzhin (Hasidic dynasty)
