= Boyan (Hasidic dynasty) =

Ukrainian Hasidic dynasty

Boyan Hasidic Dynasty
- Home of the first Boyaner Rebbe, the Pachad Yitzchok, in Boyan

Founder
- Rabbi Yitzchok Friedman

Regions with significant populations
- Israel, United States, United Kingdom, Belgium, Australia, Canada

Religions
- Hasidic Judaism

Boyan (Yiddish: באיאן) is a Hasidic dynasty named after the town of Boiany in the historic region of Bukovina, now in Ukraine. The Hasidut is headquartered in Jerusalem, with communities in Beitar Ilit, Bnei Brak, Manchester, Australia, Beit Shemesh, London, Antwerp, Manhattan, Brooklyn, Los Angeles, Monsey, Lakewood, and Atlanta. Boyan is one of the branches of the Ruzhiner dynasty, together with Bohush, Chortkov, Husiatyn, Sadigura, Kapishnitz, Vaslui and Shtefanesht.

== History ==
=== First Boyaner Rebbe ===
The founder of the dynasty was Rabbi Yitzchok Friedman (1850–1917), known as the Pachad Yitzchok. He was the eldest son of Rabbi Avrohom Yaakov Friedman (1820–1883), the first Sadigura Rebbe, and the grandson of Rabbi Yisroel Friedman of Ruzhyn (1797–1851), founder of the Ruzhiner dynasty.

Upon the death of his father in 1883, Rabbi Yitzchok and his younger brother Rabbi Yisrael (1852–1907) assumed joint leadership of their father's court. Although they were content with this arrangement, many of the Sadigura Hasidim preferred to have one Rebbe, and in 1887, the brothers agreed to draw lots to determine who would stay in Sadigura and who would move out. The lots fell to Rabbi Yisrael to remain as the second Sadigura Rebbe, while Rabbi Yitzchok moved to the neighboring town of Boiany (Boyan) and established his court there, becoming the first Boyaner Rebbe. Under this arrangement, Rabbi Yitzchak assumed the mantle of Nasi of kollel Vohlyn in Eretz Israel, and with it the Zechut of lighting the fire in Meron on Lag Baomer – a tradition still upheld by his grandson the present Boyaner Rebbe - as well as the Tiferet Yisrael synagogue in the Old City of Jerusalem. Under the leadership of the Pachad Yitzchok, Boyaner Hasidut flourished. Boyaner communities were established throughout Eastern Europe – even one as far as Berlin – as well as in Tiberias, Safed, and Jerusalem.

=== Boyaner rebbes after World War I ===
At the beginning of World War I, the town of Boyan was completely destroyed by invading armies. The Rebbe and his family escaped to Vienna, where the Rebbe died in 1917. After the war ended, three of his four sons each moved to a different country to establish their court. His eldest son, Rabbi Menachem Nachum (1869–1936), became the Boyaner Rebbe in Czernowitz, Bukovina. Rabbi Menachem Nachum's two sons, Rabbi Aharon and Rabbi Mordechai Shraga, succeeded him; they and their families were murdered by the Nazis during World War II. Rabbi Menachem Nachum's son-in-law, Rabbi Moshenu (1841–1943), became the Boyaner Rebbe in Kraków; he was murdered in Auschwitz.

The Pachad Yitzchok's second son, Rabbi Yisroel (1878–1951), became the Boyaner Rebbe in Leipzig, Germany; in 1939 he moved to Tel Aviv. He had two daughters, whose husbands did not succeed him. The Pachad Yitzchok's third son, Rabbi Avrohom Yaakov (1884–1941), became the Boyaner Rebbe in Lemberg; he was murdered by the Nazis in 1941.

The Pachad Yitzchok's youngest son, Rabbi Mordechai Shlomo, remained in Vienna with his mother until the latter's death in 1922. At that point he considered an offer to head the Hasidic community of Drohobych in Western Ukraine, and another offer to lead an organized chaburah (group) of Boyaner Hasidim on the Lower East Side of Manhattan in New York City. He embarked on an 11-month pilot trip to America in December 1925, and then spent another year weighing the pros and cons of moving to America before acceding to the request of the Boyaner Hasidim of New York to establish his court with them. He and his family arrived in New York in November 1927.

Over the next 40 years, the Boyaner Rebbe of New York succeeded in uniting the Ruzhin-Boyan survivors of the Holocaust and proved that Hasidut could be a viable lifestyle in America. The Rebbe exuded the sense of nobility and spiritual loftiness characteristic of rebbes of the Boyaner dynasty, but he also expressed a warmth and paternal concern for his disciples which attracted many American youth who had never seen a Hasidic rebbe. Yeshiva students and secular Jewish boys alike were drawn to him in large numbers, and he made many ba'alei teshuvah (returnees to the faith). The Rebbe also took an active role in American Jewish leadership, being a founder and president of the Agudath HaAdmorim (Union of Grand Rabbis) of the United States (in which capacity he participated in the Rabbi's March on Washington in 1943); first vice president of Agudath Israel of America and a member of that body's Moetzes Gedolei HaTorah; and president of Vaad HaEzra, in which capacity he raised funds to help Holocaust survivors in post-war Europe.

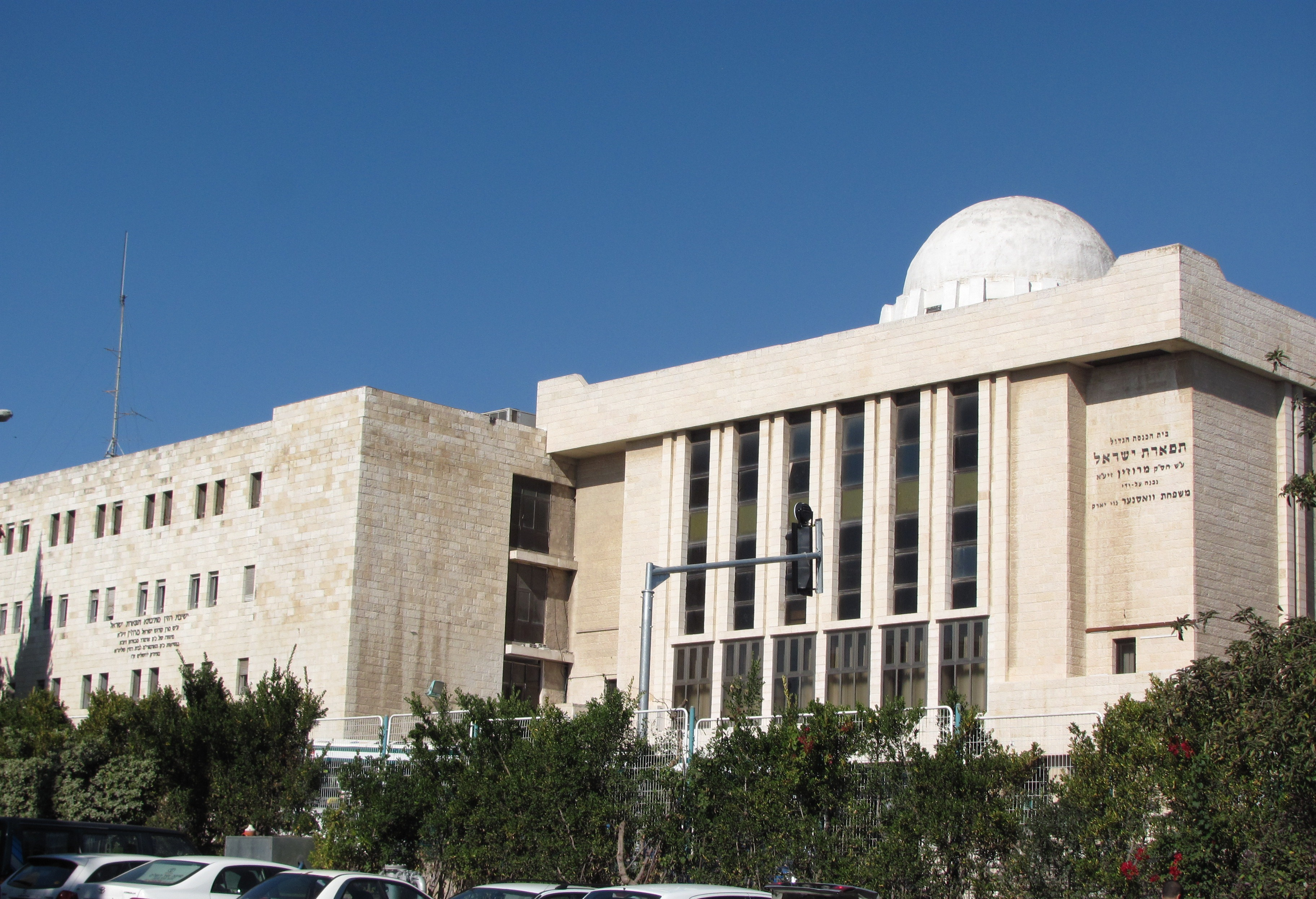
The Great Synagogue Tiferet Yisroel in Jerusalem.

In 1948 the Ruzhiner synagogue in the Old City of Jerusalem, Tiferes Yisroel (also called the Nissan Beck Synagogue), which was completed by the Sadigura Rebbe, Rabbi Avrohom Yaakov Friedman, in 1872, was destroyed by the Arab Legion during the 1948 Arab-Israeli War. On his trip to Israel in 1953, the Boyaner Rebbe of New York laid the foundations for a new Ruzhiner Torah center, also to be called Tiferes Yisroel, in the New City of Jerusalem. In 1957 the Ruzhiner yeshiva, called Mesivta Tiferes Yisroel, was inaugurated with the support of all of the rebbes of the Ruzhiner dynasty. A large synagogue was built adjacent to it, also bearing the name Tiferes Yisroel; the current Boyaner Rebbe, Rabbi Nachum Dov Brayer, leads his Hasidut from here. The design of the synagogue, located on the western end of Malkhei Yisrael Street close to the Central Bus Station, includes a large white dome, reminiscent of the domed Tiferes Yisrael Synagogue that was destroyed in the Old City.

Following Rabbi Mordechai Shlomo's death on 2 March 1971, the Boyaner Hasidim were left leaderless. The Hasidim approached the Rebbe's eldest son, Yisrael, to take over as Rebbe, but he declined. The Hasidim then asked the Rebbe's daughter Malka and her husband, Rabbi Dr. Menachem Mendel Brayer, a teacher at Yeshiva University, to offer one of their two young sons to be groomed for the position. The elder, Yigal, an aerospace engineer, was suggested and then rejected. The lot fell to the younger son, Nachum Dov (born 1959), who then enrolled at the Ruzhiner yeshiva in Jerusalem to prepare himself for the task. On Hanukkah 1984, Rabbi Nachum Dov Brayer was crowned Boyaner Rebbe. The Hasidut is now based in Jerusalem, Israel, where the Rebbe resides.

=== Boyan today ===
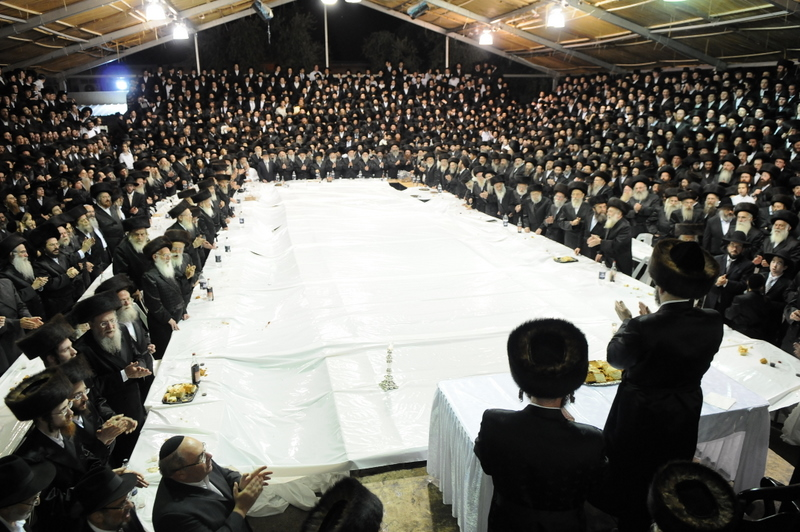
The Boyaner Rebbe, Rabbi Nachum Dov Brayer, leads a tish in the giant sukkah erected at Yeshivat Tiferes Yisroel, 2009.

Modern-day Boyaner Hasidut numbers more than 2,000 families, and is the largest of the dynasties that have their roots in the Ruzhiner dynasty. The majority of Boyaner Hasidim live in and around Jerusalem. There are also Boyaner communities in Beitar Illit, Bnei Brak, Antwerp, London, Manchester, Monsey, and the Brooklyn neighborhoods of Boro Park and Williamsburg. The kloiz that the Boyaner Rebbe of New York presided over at 247 East Broadway still draws a daily minyan, although the community is mainly centered around a small synagogue in an apartment house at West 82nd Street and West End Avenue on New York's Upper West Side where the Rebbe spent his last years. Whenever the Boyaner Rebbe visits America, he receives visitors in the former Rebbe's prayer room in the Lower East Side kloiz, and it has become a practice for chatanim (grooms) in the Boyaner community to pray here before going to the chuppah.

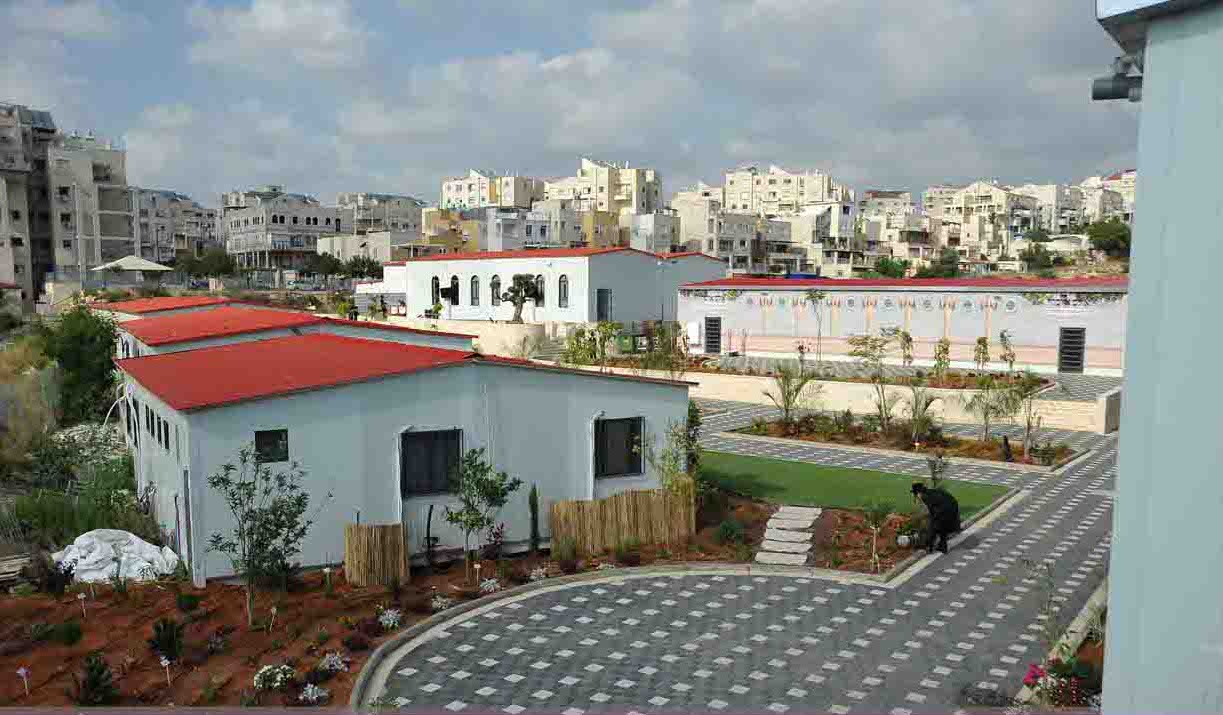
The campus of the Boyan Rizhin Yeshiva in Modiin Illit

=== Notable Hasidim ===
- Rabbi Dovid Ortinberg (Reb Dudya) (d. August 29, 1910) Av Beit Din of Berdichev and author of authoritative halacha book 'Tehila L'david'.
- Rabbi Yehoshua Heschel Brim (D. January 31, 1986) - Founding Rosh Yeshiva of Mesivta Tifereth Israel of Rizhin. A prominent talmid chacham and close talmid of Rav Isser Zalmen Meltzer.
- Rabbi Efraim Fishel Rabinowitz (November 22, 1924 - June 25, 2005) - Rosh Yeshiva of Mesivta Tifereth Israel of Ruzhin and Member of Moetzes Gedolei Hatorah in Israel.
- Rabbi Avraham Chaim Brim (1922 - March 9, 2002) - Famed Talmid Chacham, Rosh Yeshiva of Yeshiva Porat Yosef in Jerusalem, Ohel Yaakov in Bnei Brak and in New Square, NY. Primary talmid of the Chazon Ish and Rav Isser Zalman Meltzer.
- Nissan Beck (1815 – 1889) - a leader of the Hasidic Jewish community and representative of the Boyaner Rebbe in the Old Yishuv and builder of the Tiferet Yisrael Synagogue, also known as the Nissan Beck Shul.
- Baruch Barzel - Leader of the Jewish community in Safed.
- Levi Cooper - Levi Cooper, son of Hersh Cooper, Barzel descendant, a scholar of Hasidism and Jewish history and rabbi in Tzur Hadassah.
- Yehoshua Baruchi (July 9, 1910 - October 26, 1992) Muchtar of Kibbutz Tirat Zvi and the Beit She'an Valley. Mizrachi activist. Head of the religious council in Jerusalem.
- Rabbi Paltiel Yosef Rabinowitz - the Executive fundraiser for the Chassidut's Institutions in Israel.

=== Music in the Boyaner court ===
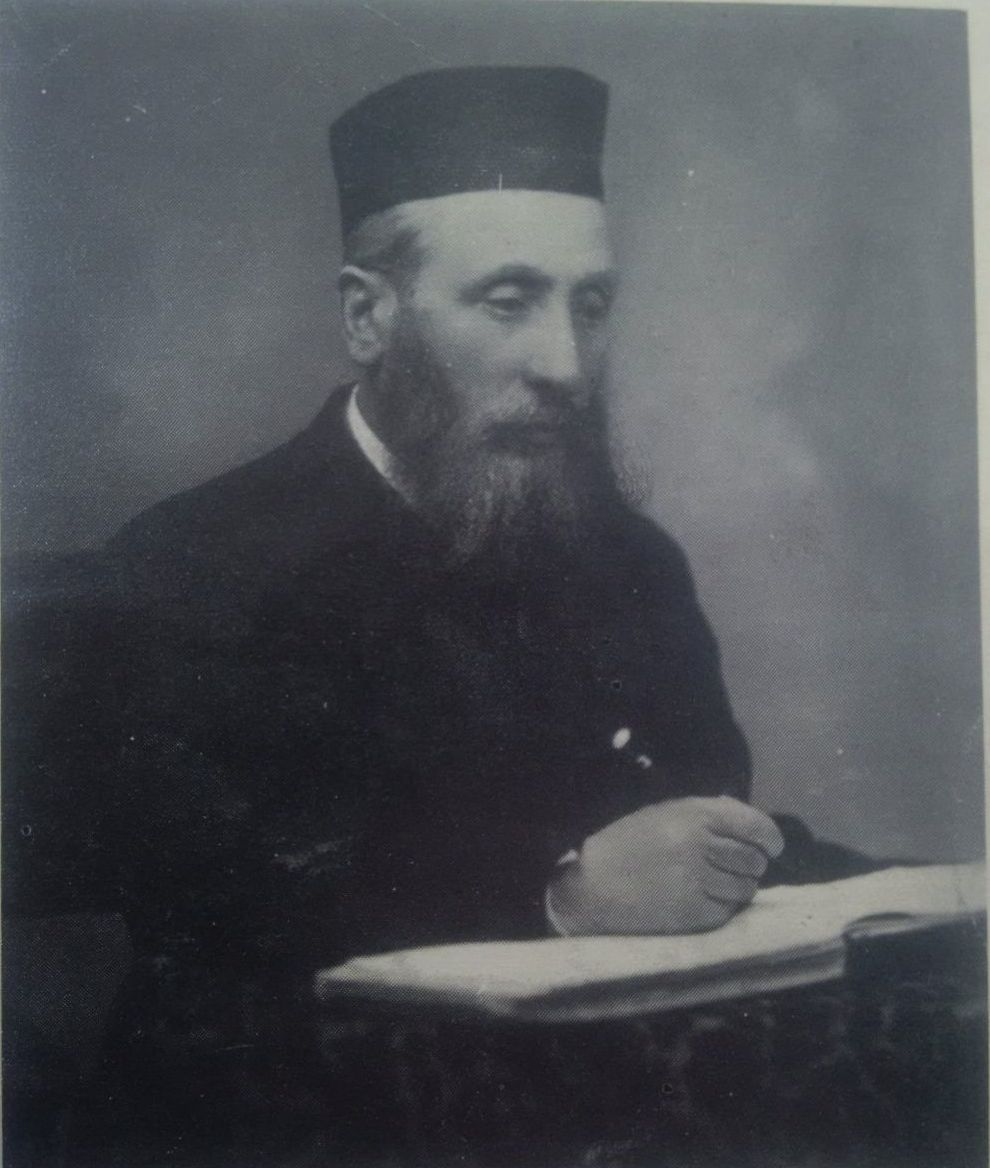
Pinchas Spector

Despite extensive musical activities in the Ruzhin court, including cantors and an orchestra, there were no generic Ruzhiner Niggunim but three that are known today 'Der Ruzh’iner's', a wordless Niggun, ‘Chassal Siddur Pesach’, attributed to Rabbi Shalom Shachna, father of R’ Yisroel of Ruzhin, and a niggun attributed to Reb Avraham son of the Maggid of Mezritch ‘the Malach’. Famous cantors and composers who left their mark on the Boyaner Repertoire were:

- Cantor Naftali Hazan, who worked in the court of Sadigura and Boyan in 1878-1897.
- Pinchas Spector (Pinye Chazan), who came to Boyan in the early twentieth century. As was common for contemporary cantors who worked for a living in several places, he composed works of polyphony for many texts, Sabbath prayers, holidays, and Yamim Nora'im. In recent years, many of his compositions were restored from notes discovered in his estate, and revived and re-introduced in the Boyaner court.
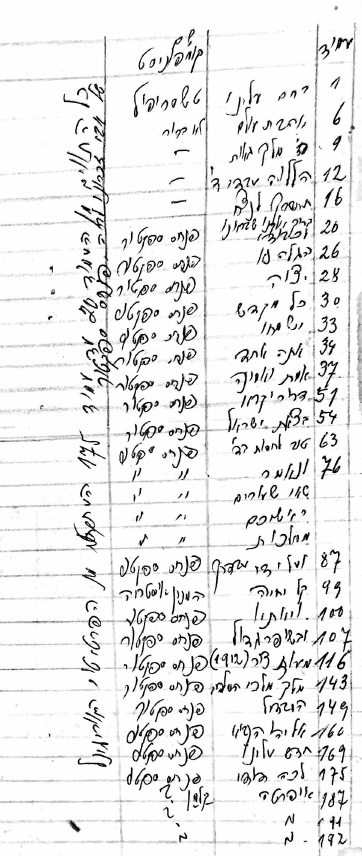
  Pinchas Spektor Manuscript: Table of Contents
  - A manuscript book containing mostly compositions of Pinchas Spector (also spelled Spektor) is in the possession of his grandson, born Jehoshua Spektor in Leipzig, Germany, 1924. It appears that one of Pinchas's children (most likely his daughter, Sara), transcribed the music from his original scores. A scan of the table of contents from this collection is shown. To the left, written vertically, is a statement in Hebrew which translates as: "All entries from page 20 through page 175 I have copied from the original scores of my father, of blessed memory, Pinchas Spektor." An example image of one of the pages of music is also displayed.

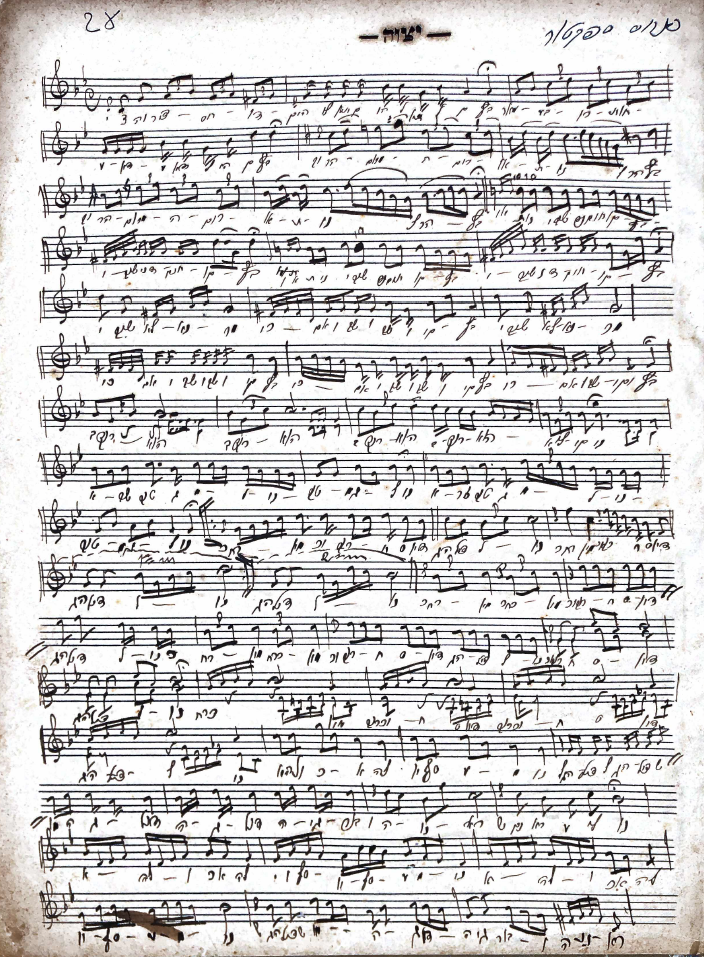
This is an image of a page from a collection of transcriptions of the compositions of Pinchas Spektor.

- One of his students, Moshe Lerman, known as Moshe Chazan, immigrated to Israel, was the Chazan of the Boyan synagogue in the old city of Jerusalem and taught many of his works.
- Today, Pinchas Brochshtat leads the capella of Boyaner Chassidim at the present Rebbe's court in Jerusalem.

== Lag BaOmer tradition ==
The Boyaner Rebbe traditionally lights the first bonfire at the annual Lag BaOmer celebration at the tomb of Rabbi Shimon Bar Yochai in Meron, Israel. This privilege was purchased by Rabbi Avrohom Yaakov Friedman, the first Sadigura Rebbe, from the Sephardi guardians of Meron and Safed; the Sadigura Rebbe bequeathed this honor to his eldest son, Rabbi Yitzchok, the first Boyaner Rebbe, and his progeny. The first hadlakah (lighting) is attended by hundreds of thousands of people each year; in 2001, the crowd was estimated at 300,000.

== Lineage of the Boyaner dynasty ==
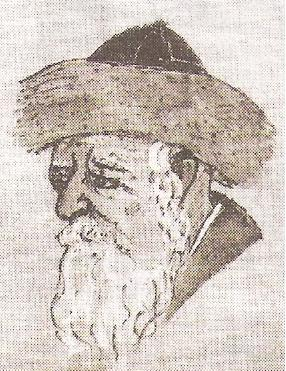
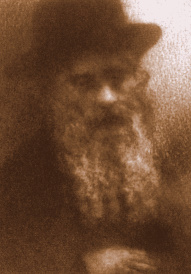
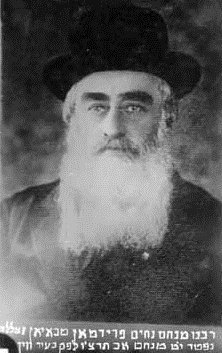
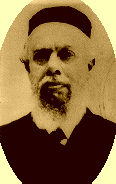
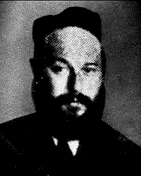
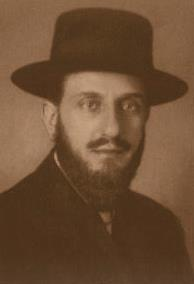
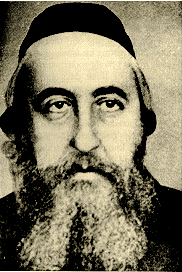
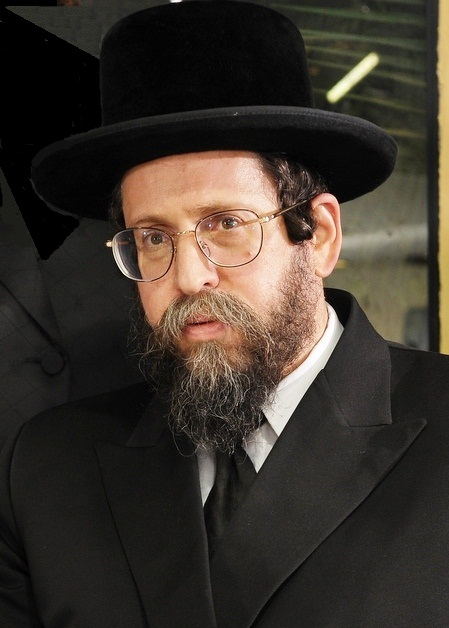
Yisroel ben Eliezer (1698-1760); The Baal Shem Tov
Dov Ber of Mezritsh (1710-1772); The Maggid of Mezritsh (disciple of the Baal Shem Tov)
Avrohom the Angel; Reb Avrohom HaMalach
Sholom Shachne of Prohobisht; Reb Sholom of Prhobisht
Yisroel Friedman (1797-1851); Rebbe of Ruzhin
Father → Son
Avrohom Yaakov Friedman (1820-1883); 1st Rebbe of Sadigura
Son-in-law
Yitzchok Friedman (1850-1917); Pachad Yitzchok; 1st Rebbe of Boyan
Menachem Nachum Friedman (1869-1936); Boyaner Rebbe of Chernowitz	Yisroel Friedman (1878-1951); Boyaner Rebbe of Leipzig/Tel Aviv	Avrohom Yaakov Friedman (1884-1941); Boyaner Rebbe of Lemberg	Mordechai Shlomo Friedman (1891-1971); Boyaner Rebbe of New York	Dov Ber Friedman (1882-1936); Rebbe of Chortkov
Moshenyu Friedman (1881-1943); Boyaner Rebbe of Kraków (son of Rabbi Sholom Yoseph of Husiatyn)	Aharon Friedman (1890-1942); Boyaner Rebbe of Chernowitz	Mordechai Shraga Friedman (1895-1942); Boyaner Rebbe of Chernowitz	Menachem Brayer d. 2007 (did not become Rebbe)
Nachum Dov Brayer (b. 1959); Boyaner Rebbe of Jerusalem

== See also ==
- History of the Jews in Poland
- History of the Jews in Ukraine
- History of the Jews in Galicia (Eastern Europe)
