= Yisroel Friedman =

Yisroel Friedman may refer to:

- Yisrael Friedman of Ruzhin, 19th century Jewish leader known as the Ruzhiner Rebbe
- Yisroel Friedman, the second Rebbe of Sadigura
- Yisroel Friedman, the second rebbe of Chortkov
- Yisroel Moshe Friedman, the sixth Rebbe of Sadigura
- Yisroel Friedman (rosh yeshiva), rosh yeshiva of Oholei Torah
- Yisrael Friedman (Pashkaner Rebbe), the Pashkaner Rebbe
- Yisroel Friedman, Present Chortkov Rebbe in Manchester
- Israel Freedman, Romanian-American Yiddish journalist
