= Chortkov (Hasidic dynasty) =

Ukrainian Hasidic dynasty

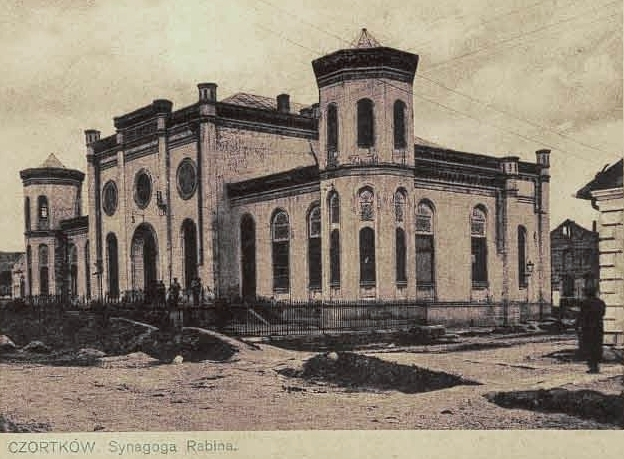
The Hasidic synagogue in Chortkov, Poland, before 1939

Chortkov (also Chortkov, Tshortkov, Czortkow) is a Hasidic dynasty that originated in Chortkiv (Polish: Czortków), present-day Ukraine. The town was part of the Tarnopol Voivodeship of the Second Polish Republic until September 1939. The town itself was founded in 1522 by Polish King Sigismund I the Old. The dynasty had a large following before the Second World War, but most of its adherents were murdered in the Holocaust.

Chortkov is one of the branches of the Ruzhiner dynasty, together with the Bohush, Boyan, Husiatyn, Sadigura, Kapishnitz, Vasloi, and Shtefanesht dynasties.

== Chortkov dynasty history ==
=== Duvid Moshe Friedman ===
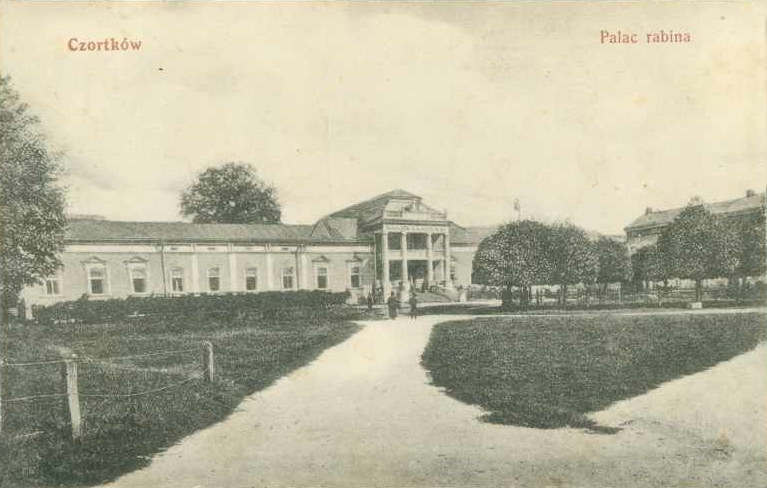
The palatial home of the Rebbe in Chortkov

The first Rebbe of Chortkov was Rabbi Duvid Moshe Friedman (1828–1903), son of Rabbi Yisroel Friedman of Ruzhyn. He was born in 1828 on the festival of Shavuos. His first wife was the daughter of Rabbi Aaron Twerski of Chernobyl. In 1865, 14 years after his father's death, he settled in Chortkov forming his own community there. Rabbi David Moshe completely divorced himself from carnal desires and was constant in his devotion to God. His followers were one of the largest Hasidic groups in Galicia, numbering in the thousands. He died on Hoshana Rabbah, 1903, and was succeeded by his second son, Yisroel, his first son having predeceased him. His teachings have been published in Divrei Dovid, Beis Yisroel and Knesset Yisroel.

=== Yisroel Friedman ===
Rabbi Dovid Moshe's son was Rabbi Yisroel Friedman, who died in 1933. After Yisroel, his sons, Rabbi Nochum Mordechai Friedman and Rabbi Dov Ber Friedman, served as Rebbes. Dov Ber died in 1936. Rabbi Nochum fled to the British Mandate of Palestine in 1939 and died in Jerusalem in 1946. His son Rabbi Shlomo Friedman led the Chortkover Hasidim until his death in Tel Aviv in 1959.

=== Later history ===
Among the leaders of the Chortkover Hasidim are Rabbi Yisroel Friedman of Manchester, England, and Rabbi Dov Ber Friedman of Antwerp, Belgium. Both are grandsons of the Dov Ber who do not use the title of Chortkover Rebbe. In addition to the Chortkover communities in Manchester and Antwerp, there is also one in Jerusalem, and one in Safed (Tzefas).

== Lineage of the Chortkov dynasty ==
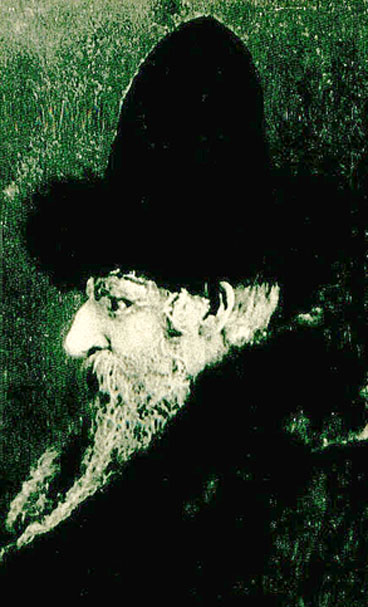
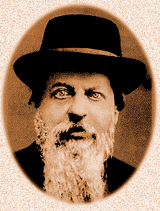
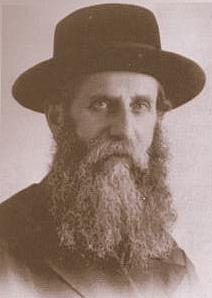
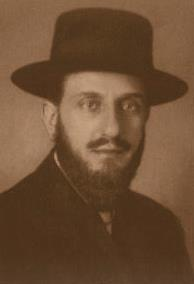
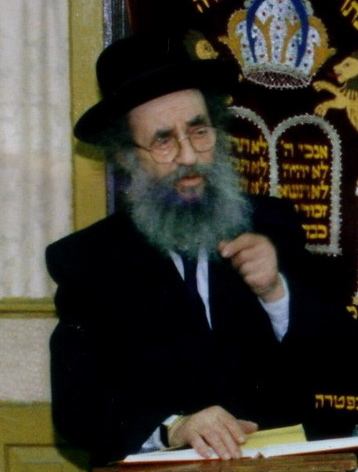
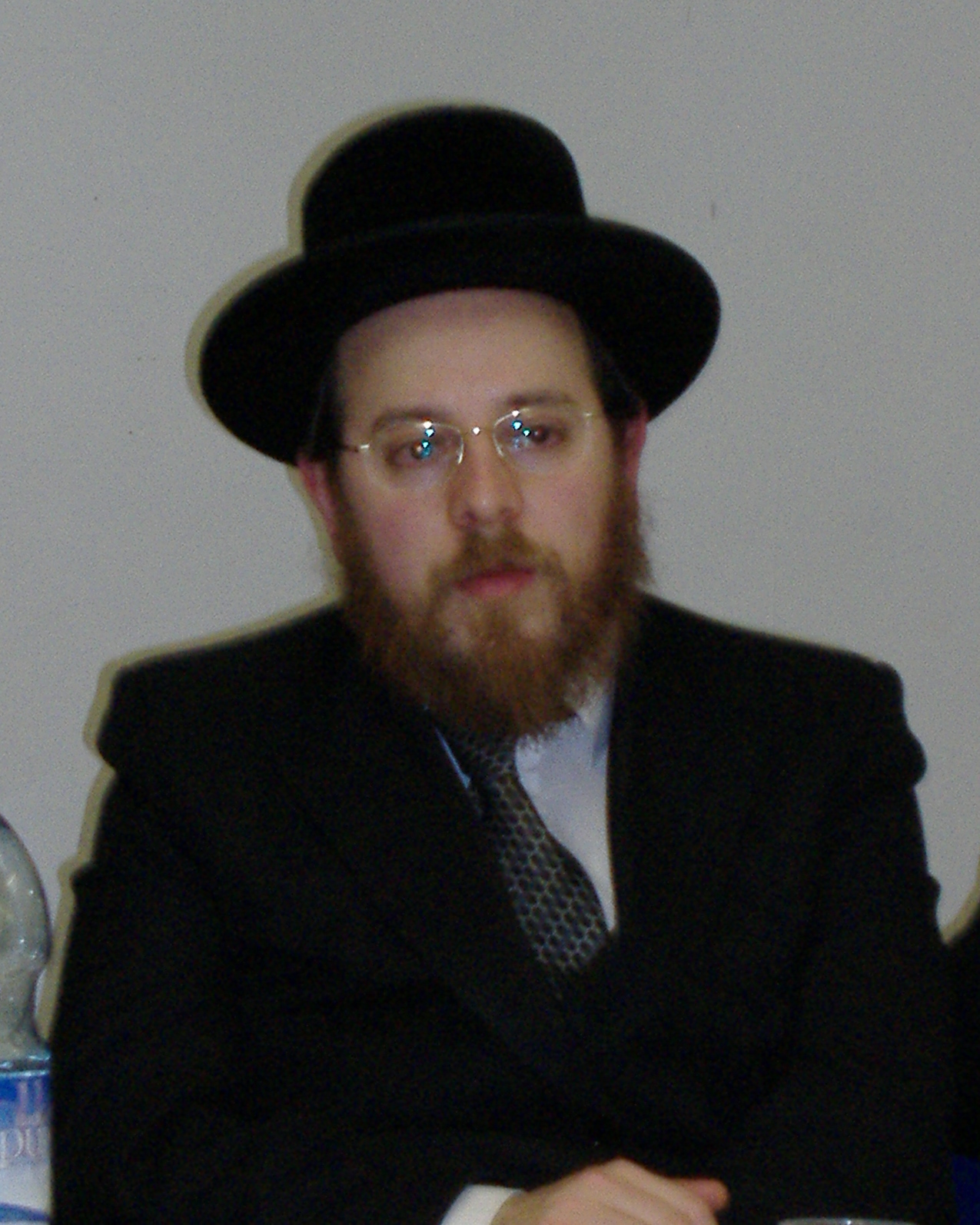
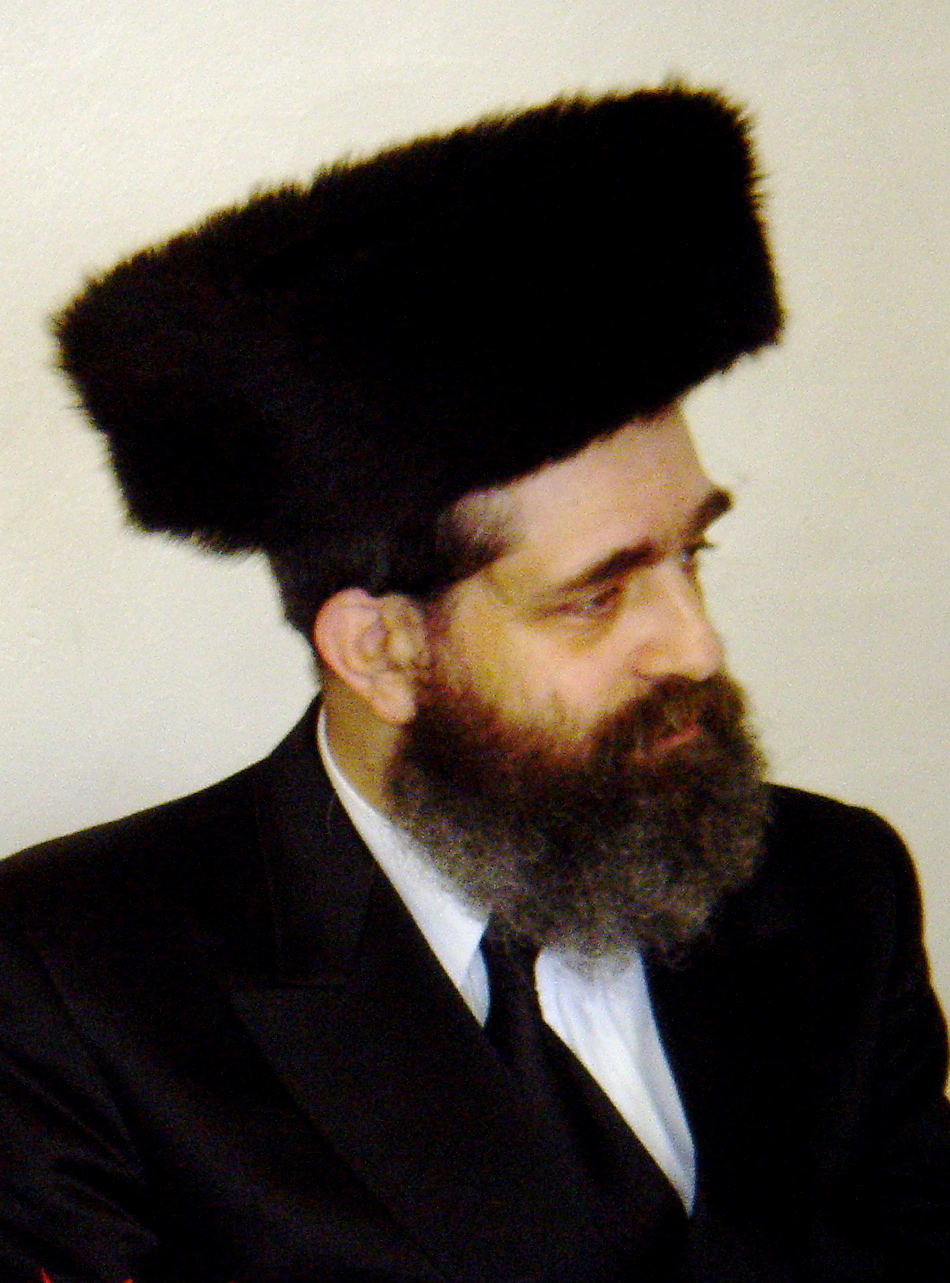
Yisroel ben Eliezer (1698-1760); The Baal Shem Tov	Dov Ber of Mezeritch (1710-1772); The Maggid of Mezritsh (disciple of the Baal Shem Tov)	Avrohom the Angel; Reb Avrohom HaMalach	Sholom Shachne of Prohobisht; Reb Sholom of Prhobisht	Yisroel Friedman (1797-1851); Rebbe of Ruzhin
↑ Father ↓ Son	- - Son-in-law
Dovid Moshe Friedman (1827-1903); 1st Rebbe of Chortkov	Yisroel Friedman (1854-1933); 2nd Rebbe of Chortkov
Nachum Mordechai Friedman (1874-1946); 3rd Rebbe of Chortkov	Dov Ber Friedman (1882-1936); Rebbe of Chortkov	Zvi Aryeh Twersky (1890-1968); Rebbe of Zlatipol-Chortkov
Shlomo Friedman (1894-1959); 4th Rebbe of Chortkov	Dovid Moshe Friedman (1914-1988) (did not become Rebbe)	Pinchos Biberfeld of Tel Aviv/Munich (d.1999); Rosh Kollel of Zlatipol-Chortkov and Chief Rabbi of Munich
Yisroel Friedman of Manchester	Dov Ber Friedman of Antwerp	Yitzcok Halpern of Bnei Brak son of Vasloier Rebbe	Chaim Michoel Biberfel

== Historic photographs of Synagogue ==
A portion of the ornately carved ceiling of the Hassidic Synagogue

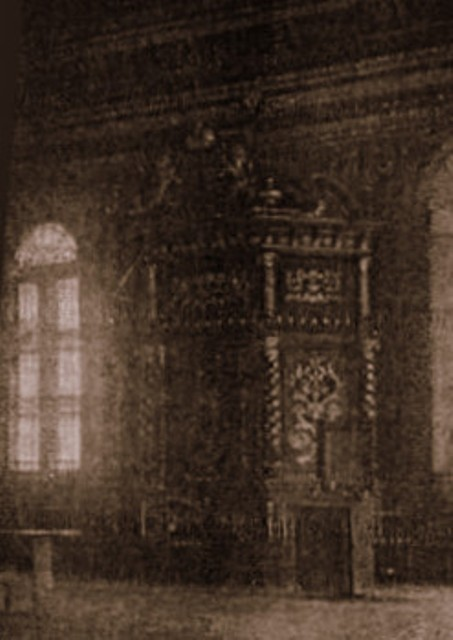
The Torah Ark of the Hassidic Synagogue

== See also ==
- History of the Jews in Poland
- History of the Jews in Galicia (Central Europe)
- History of the Jews in Ukraine
