= Chortkov =

Chortkov may refer to:

- Chortkiv, a town in Ternopil Oblast, Ukraine
- Chortkov (Hasidic dynasty), a Hasidic dynasty from Chortkiv
