= Bohush (Hasidic dynasty) =

Romanian Hasidic dynasty

Bohush Hasidic Dynasty
Founder
- Rabbi Yitzchok Friedman

Regions with significant populations
- Israel, United States, Antwerp, London

Religions
- Hasidic Judaism

Related ethnic groups
- Ruzhin (Hasidic dynasty), Boyan, Chortkov, Husiatyn, Sadigura, Shtefanesht

Bohush (Yiddish: בוהוש) is a Hasidic dynasty named for the town of Buhuși, Romania. The dynasty began in the mid-nineteenth century with Rabbi Yitzchok Friedman of Bohush, the eldest grandson of Rabbi Yisrael Friedman of Ruzhyn, and was based in that town until 1951, when his great-grandson, Rabbi Yitzchok Friedman of Bohush-Tel Aviv, moved the dynasty to Tel Aviv. In 1987 the Bohush beis medrash was transferred to Bnei Brak, where the dynasty is led today by Rabbi Yaakov Mendel Friedman, a great-great-grandson of the first Bohusher Rebbe.

Rabbi Yaakov Mendel leads his court at 12 Rechov Chaggai, a few doors away from the original Kloyz in Bnei Brak. He leads it with a fire and a passion. Since he took on the mantle of leadership, the Hasidus has expanded tremendously with three yeshivos, two kollels, and communities all over Israel, in The United States, Antwerp and London.

Bohush is one of the branches of the Ruzhiner dynasty, together with Boyan, Chortkov, Husiatyn, Sadigura, and Shtefanesht.

== Lineage ==
- Rebbe Yisrael Friedman of Ruzhin (born October 5, 1796, at Ruzhyn, died October 9, 1851, at Sadhora), the Ruzhiner Rebbe
  - Rebbe Shalom Yosef Friedman of Sadigura (born 1812 at Ruzhin, died September 8, 1851, at Leipzig), eldest son of Rebbe Yisrael
    - Rebbe Yitzchok Friedman, first rebbe of Bohush (born December 7, 1834, at Buhuşi, died August 19, 1896, at Buhuşi), son of Rebbe Shalom Yosef. Rebbe Yitzchok is sometimes referred to as the "Pachad Yitzchak" of Bohush (not to be confused with his first cousin, the Pachad Yitzchak of Boyan, son of Rabbi Avraham Yaakov of Sadigura).
      - Rebbe Yisroel Shulem Yosef Friedman of Bohush (born September 25, 1855, at Buhuşi, died April 9, 1923, at Buhuşi), son of Rebbe Yitzchok
      - Rebbe Dovid Friedman of Bohush, second son of Rebbe Yitzchok
        - Rebbe Menachem Mendel Fridman of Bohush (died 1943 at Buhuşi after the Romanian authorities didn't allow him to travel to Bucharest for surgery), son of Rebbe Dovid and son-in-law of Rebbe Yisroel Shulem Yosef
        - Rebbe Sholom Yosef of Shpikov (died 1920 of typhus), son of Rebbe Dovid Friedman of Bohush
          - Rebbe Yitzchok Friedman of Bohush-Shpikov (born May 1903 at Shpikov, died August 12, 1992, at Arosa), son of Rebbe Sholom Yosef and husband of his cousin, Yocheved Feige, daughter of Rebbe Menachem Mendel
            - Rebbe Yaakov Mendel Friedman of Bohush, grandson of Rebbe Yitzchok
      - Rebbe Moshe Yehudah Leib Friedman of Pashkan ("the Pashkaner Rebbe"; 1865-1947), fourth son of Rebbe Yitzchok
      - Sheva Shapira (Friedman), daughter of Rebbe Yitzchok of Bohush, wife of Rebbe Chaim Meir Yechiel Shapira, Rebbe of Drohobitz (son of Hadassah Faigah, who was the daughter of Rebbe Avrohom Yaakov Friedman, first Rebbe of Sadigura)
        - Rebbe Avraham Yaakov Shapira of Drohobitz, son of Rebbe Chaim Meir Yechiel Shapira and Sheva Shapira (Friedman), Rebbe of Drohobitz
      - Chava Gitel (born and died in Romania), daughter of Rebbe Yitzchok, wife of Rebbe Mordechai Zishe Twersky
        - Rebbe Dovid Twersky of Bohush (born 1884 at Turiisk, died December 11, 1933, at Iaşi), son of Chava Gitel and son-in-law of Rebbe Yisroel Shulem Yosef

== See also ==
- Hasidic Judaism
- Hasidic rebbes
- History of the Jews in Romania
- Romania in World War II
- Trisk (Hasidic dynasty)
