= Pinchas Biberfeld =

Pinchas Paul Biberfeld (Hebrew: פנחס ביברפלד; 31 October 1915 – 23 January 1999) was a rabbi in Germany and Israel.

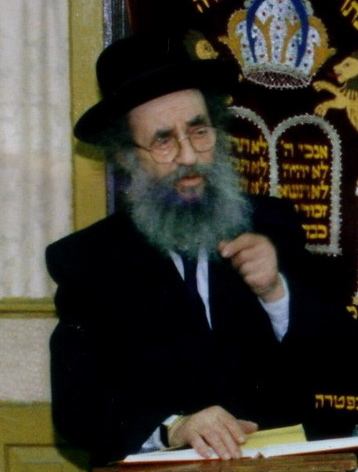
Pinchas Paul Biberfeld (1915-1999)

== Childhood ==
Rabbi Pinchas Paul Biberfeld was born on October 31, 1915, in Berlin. His father, Dr. Chaim Eduard Biberfeld (1864–1939), a famous rabbi and physician, was a co-founder of the Israelitische Krankenheim (Jewish hospital) in Berlin.

== Life ==
Biberfeld completed his rabbinical studies at the Hildesheimer Rabbinical Seminary (Rabbiner Seminar für das Orthodoxe Judenthum) in Berlin where he received his smicha from Dr. Jechiel Weinberg. After his family was forced to leave Germany in 1939 Biberfeld immigrated to Palestine via Triest and Haifa. In the same year his father died after a longstanding illness. In Palestine he continued his studies at the yeshivas of Kol Torah and Hebron in Jerusalem, before marrying the daughter of Zvi Aryeh Twersky, Rebbe of Zlatipol-Chortkov.

In the 1950s Rabbi Biberfeld founded the still functioning Kollel Zlatipol-Chortkov in Tel-Aviv, where he served as Rosh-Kollel for 30 years. Moreover he was a publisher of the rabbinic journal "Hane'eman", printing responsa of distinguished rabbinical scholars and his own novel insights. Rabbi Biberfeld also edited the Hebrew edition of his father's classical manual about the laws of the Sabbath ("Die Sabbath Vorschriften") under the Hebrew title "Menucho Nechauno", which has been reprinted several times.

In 1984 Rabbi Biberfeld succeeded Rabbi Hans Isaak Grünewald in Munich. During the ten years as Chief Rabbi of Munich (Oberrabbiner der Israelitischen Kultusgemeinde München) he influenced Jewish life in Germany profoundly, especially by redefining the rabbi's role as the foremost authority within the community.

After a sudden deterioration of his health in 1998, he spent his last months with his son, Rabbi Chaim Michoel (Michael) Biberfeld - Rabbi of South Tottenham Synagogue as well as rabbi of the Chortkov Hassidic synagogue in Stamford Hill, London - where he died on January 23, 1999. He is buried at the Jewish cemetery on the Mount of Olives in Jerusalem.

== Publications ==
A short list of Rabbi Biberfeld's writings in German:

- Es führt ein mühsamer Weg ans Licht, Jüdische Zeitung, April 6, 1987
- Altes und neues Wunder, Jüdische Zeitung, April 1, 1988
- Eine Nacht, die anders ist, Jüdische Zeitung, April 9, 1990
- Die zehn Plagen, Münchner Jüdische Gemeindezeitung, Heft 22, March 29, 1993
