= Yitzchok Friedman =

Ukrainian rabbi (1850–1917)

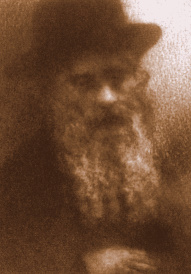
- Only known picture of Rabbi Yitzchok Friedman, the Pachad Yitzchok of Boyan
- Title: First Boyaner Rebbe

Personal life
- Born: Yitzchok Friedman; 1850 Sadigura, Duchy of Bukovina, Austrian Empire (now Chernivtsi Oblast, Ukraine)
- Died: 11 March 1917 (aged 66–67) Vienna, Austria-Hungary
- Buried: Vienna
- Spouse: Malka Twersky
- Children: Menachem Nachum; Yisroel; Avrohom Yaakov; Mordechai Shlomo; Miriam
- Parents: Avrohom Yaakov Friedman of Sadigura (father); Miriam (mother)
- Dynasty: Boyan

Religious life
- Religion: Judaism

Jewish leader
- Predecessor: None
- Successor: Rabbi Menachem Nachum Friedman of Boyan-Chernowitz; Rabbi Yisrael Friedman of Boyan-Leipzig; Rabbi Avrohom Yaakov Friedman of Boyan-Lemberg; Rabbi Mordechai Shlomo Friedman of Boyan-New York City; Rabbi Moshenu of Boyan-Kraków
- Began: 1887
- Ended: 11 March 1917
- Main work: Pachad Yitzchok
- Dynasty: Boyan

Rabbi Yitzchok Friedman (1849 – 11 March 1917) was the grandson of Rabbi Yisrael of Ruzhin, founder of the Ruzhin Hasidic dynasty. In 1887, Rabbi Yitzchok Friedman established a Hasidic court in Boiany (Bukovina), which later became the Boyaner Hasidic dynasty and served as its first Rebbe until World War I. During his time as leader, Boyan communities were established in Eastern Europe as well as in Tiberias, and Jerusalem. Scholarship notes that Volhynia (Vohlyn) kolel operated under the Israel of Ruzhin's patronage and his descendants. Friedman was part of this lineage and associated with that institutional network. During World War I, Friedman relocated to Vienna, where he died in 1917. His sons established courts in Chernivtsi (Czernowitz), Leipzig, Lviv, and New York.

== Early life ==
Yitzchok Friedman was born in Sadigura, Duchy of Bukovina (present-day Chernivtsi Oblast, Ukraine), then part of the Austro-Hungarian Empire. Friedman was the eldest son of Rabbi Avrohom Yaakov Friedman (1820–1883), the first Sadigura Rebbe, and his wife, Miriam. He was the grandson of Rabbi Yisroel of Ruzhin (1797–1851), founder of the Ruzhin dynasty.

At the age of 15, Friedman married Malka Twersky, daughter of Rabbi Yochanan Twersky, the Rachmastrivka Rebbe. They had four sons and one daughter together.

== Founding of Boyaner Hasidism ==
After his father's death in 1883, Rabbi Yitzchok and his younger brother, Rabbi Yisrael (1852–1907), led their father's Hasidim. In 1887 Rabbi Yitzchok moved to Boiany, establishing his court and becoming the first Boyaner Rebbe. Rabbi Yisrael stayed in Sadigura.

During Friedman's time as leader, Boiany became a Hasidic center with a synagogue and four prayer houses. Boyaner communities were established in neighboring towns as well as in Jerusalem, Tiberias, and Safed. Rabbi Yitzchok encouraged Dov Ber Horenstein, one of his wealthy childless Hasidim, to build houses in Jerusalem as a memorial for himself. The neighborhood founded by Dov Ber Horenstein was formed near what is now known as Geula.

Friedman lived in a palatial home, reflecting the Ruzhin tradition founded by his grandfather, Rabbi Yisrael of Ruzhin. He inherited the title of Nasi (president) of Kolel Vohlin in the Land of Israel from his father, taking on the responsibility of coordinating all funds sent for the welfare of the Orthodox community in Israel.

== Final years and succession ==
At the beginning of World War I, the Russian army occupied Boiany and the Jewish neighborhood was destroyed. Friedman and his family fled to Vienna.

In 1916, Friedman suffered from health complications but recovered. On 11 March 1917 (17 Adar 5677), his condition worsened once again. He died singing a nigun of deveikut (attachment to God). Friedman was buried in the Vienna Jewish cemetery. His eldest son, Rabbi Menachem Nachum (1869–1936), was buried in the same ohel.

The palatial home of the Pachad Yitzchok in Boyan.

After the war, Friedman’s four sons settled in different countries, where they each established their own courts. Rabbi Menachem Nachum, his eldest son, became the Boyaner Rebbe in Chernowitz, Ukraine. Rabbi Menachem Nachum's son-in-law, Rabbi Moshenu (1841–1943), became the Boyaner Rebbe in Kraków, Poland. Friedman's second son, Rabbi Yisroel (1878–1951), became the Boyaner Rebbe in Leipzig, Germany. His third son, Rabbi Avrohom Yaakov (1884–1941), became the Boyaner Rebbe in Lemberg (now Lviv, Ukraine). His fourth son, Rabbi Mordechai Shlomo (1891–1971), became the Boyaner Rebbe in New York City.

After the death of Rabbi Mordechai, the Boyaner dynasty remained without a leader until 1984, when Shlomo's grandson, Rabbi Nachum Dov Brayer (born 1959), was crowned Boyaner Rebbe. The dynasty is now based in Jerusalem, Israel, where Brayer resides.
