= Vasloi (Hasidic dynasty) =

Romanian Hasidic dynasty

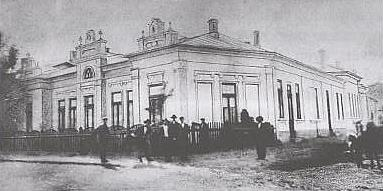
Shalom Halpern's home in Vaslui

Vasloi was a Hasidic dynasty centered in Vaslui, Romania, and founded by Rabbi Shalom Halpern, a grandson of Rabbi Yisroel Friedman of Ruzhyn in the Russian Empire.

== History ==
Shalom Halpern was born on 15 Shevat, 1857, to Rabbi Dovid Halpern of Berdychiv and Leah, a daughter of Rabbi Yisroel Friedman. In 1873, aged 17, he married his cousin Chana Sarah, daughter of Rabbi Yitzchok Friedman of Buhuși (Yiddish: Bohush), a town in the Kingdom of Romania. He subsequently settled among the Jewish community in Buhuşi for many years, until he was nearly thirty, when his father-in-law decided that the time was ripe for him to become a rebbe himself.and sent him to the village of Răducani (Radukan), later part of Lunca Banului, Vaslui County where he stayed for more than 13 years. After the opening of a school in the area by the Haskalah (Jewish Enlightenment) movement Halpern demanded it be closed and left Răducani because it was not, settling in nearby Vaslui (Vasloi) where a large court and synagogue were built for him.

On the 24 of Av, 1939, Halpern died. His only son Chaim Dov replaced him and left Romania in 1950 for Israel, where he died in 1957. He was succeeded by his son Yaakov Shlomo who was in turn succeeded by his son as rebbe of Vasloi, Avrahom Shimshon Shalom of Bnei Brak, whose synagogue and Beit Midrash (studyhouse) are in Tel Aviv.
