= Yisrael Friedman of Ruzhin =

Ukrainian rabbi

- Title: Ruzhiner Rebbe

Personal life
- Born: Yisroel Friedman; October 5, 1796 Pohrebyshche, Russian Empire
- Died: October 9, 1850 (aged 54) Sadigura, then Austria
- Buried: Sadigura
- Spouse: Sarah, Malka
- Children: Sholom Yosef; Chaya Malka; Avrohom Yaakov; Gittel Tova; Menachem Nochum; Miriam; Dov Ber; Dovid Moshe; Leah; Mordechai Shraga
- Parents: Rabbi Sholom Shachne (father); Chava (mother)
- Dynasty: Ruzhin

Religious life
- Religion: Judaism

Jewish leader
- Began: 1813
- Ended: 1850
- Dynasty: Ruzhin

Israel Friedman of Ruzhyn (Hebrew: ישראל פרידמן מרוז'ין) (5 October 1796 – 9 October 1850), also called Israel Ruzhin, was a Hasidic rebbe in 19th-century Ukraine and Austria. Known as Der Heiliger Ruzhiner (Yiddish: דער הייליגער רוזשינער, "The holy one from Ruzhyn"), he conducted his court with regal pomp and splendor. Tsar Nicholas I of Russia, who was said to be jealous of the Rebbe's wealth and influence, had the Rebbe imprisoned for nearly two years on an unsubstantiated murder charge. After his release, the Rebbe fled to Austria, where he re-established his court in Sadigura, Bukovina (Carpathian Mountains), attracted thousands of Hasidim, provided for the Hasidic community on the Land of Israel, and inaugurated the construction of the Tiferet Yisrael Synagogue in the Old City of Jerusalem.

Friedman was the first and only Ruzhiner Rebbe. However, his sons and grandsons founded their own dynasties, collectively known as the "House of Ruzhin". These dynasties, which follow many of the traditions of the Ruzhiner Rebbe, are Bohush, Boyan, Chortkov, Husiatyn, Sadigura, and Shtefanesht. The founders of the Vizhnitz, Skver, and Vasloi Hasidic dynasties were related to the Ruzhiner Rebbe through his daughters.

== Early life ==
Friedman was a direct descendant through the male line of Rabbi Dov Ber of Mezeritch (the Maggid of Mezritch) (1704–1772), the main disciple of the Baal Shem Tov. He was the great-grandson of the Maggid of Mezritch, the grandson of Rabbi Avrohom HaMalach Friedman (1739–1776), and the son of Rabbi Sholom Shachne of Prohobisht (1769–1802). His maternal grandfather was Rabbi Nochum of Chernobyl, a close associate of the Baal Shem Tov. He was given the name Yisroel (Israel) after the Baal Shem Tov, Rabbi Israel ben Eliezer. He had two older brothers, Avrohom (1787–1812) and Dov Ber (the latter died in childhood), and a younger sister, Chaya Ita.

Claiming descent from the Royal line of King David, his father, the rebbe of Porebishtsh, comported himself differently from other Hasidic leaders of the time. While most Hasidic leaders dressed in white clothes, he wore fashionable woolen clothes sewn with buttons. He also lived in an impressive house with a large garden. These elements would later be incorporated into Friedman's conduct as rebbe.

Friedman was six years old when his father died and his brother Avrohom, aged 15, took over the leadership of their father's Hasidim in Porebishtsh. At age 7, Friedman was engaged to Sarah, daughter of Rabbi Moses Efrati of Berdichev. At age 13, he married and moved to Botoșani, Romania. Three years later, his brother Avrohom died without offspring and he performed Halizah and succeeded his brother as leader of the Porebishtsh Hasidim. After living first in Porebishtsh and then in Skvyra, Friedman settled in Ruzhin, where he achieved the reputation of a great holy man and attracted thousands of followers, making the Ruzhin dynasty "the largest and most influential Hasidic community in the southwestern districts of the Pale of Settlement". His leadership also promoted widespread acceptance of the Hasidic movement, allowing Hasidism to flourish in Ukraine and Volhynia without opposition for the next hundred years.

== Regal court ==
The Ruzhiner Rebbe was a charismatic leader known for his aristocratic demeanor. He set a regal tone for his court, living in a palatial home with splendid furnishings; riding in a silver-handled carriage drawn by four white horses; being accompanied by an entourage of attendants; and wearing a golden yarmulke and stylish clothing with solid-gold buttons. His children, too, dressed like nobility and were attended by servants in livery.

Although this type of grandeur and opulence was highly unusual for Hasidic leaders, the Rebbe was accepted by many leading rabbis and rebbes of his time, who accepted that he was comporting himself in a way that would elevate God's glory through His representative, the tzadik. The Ruzhiner Rebbe was thought by his followers to constantly humble himself before God and afflicted his body with fasts and other afflictions. Allegedly, one winter night, after standing outdoors to sanctify the New Moon wearing his solid-gold boots studded with diamonds, his Hasidim noticed blood on the snow where he had been standing. They discovered that the extravagant boots had no sole, and thus, when the Rebbe walked outside, he was essentially walking barefoot. After that, people understood that the Rebbe's style of living was meant solely for the sake of Heaven.

The impressions of contemporaries who knew him are interesting. Dr. S. Rubin described him as follows:

He spoke little, confining his remarks to the absolute essential. All his movements were deliberate… He sat upon his throne dressed in immaculate and expensive garments, like one of the Russian nobles, and on his head a hat embroidered in gold. From the tips of his toes to his head, there was an elegance about his expensive clothes.

Dr. Mayer, who visited Israel in 1826, was filled with enthusiasm for his personality:

When I visited him in his home, I found there Field-Marshal Witgenstein who honored him in every possible manner and wanted to present him with one of the most beautiful of his palaces, in a neighboring town, so that he should take up residence there… in truth he deserves all this honor. Although not particularly educated, he has a preeminently naturally keen mind. With his sharp eye and keen intellect he immediately penetrates to the heart of any difficulty brought to him, however obscure and complicated, and arrives at a decision. His imposing presence and his stature make a pleasing impression upon the onlooker. He is noble and refined: He has no beard, only a moustache. His eyes exercise a hypnotic charm so that even his greatest opponent is compelled to submit to him.

The Rebbe related to the poor and downtrodden as to the famous rebbes and Hasidim who flocked to his court. He also gained the respect of the Russian upper class.

== Imprisonment and escape ==
The Rebbe's extravagant lifestyle and prestige aroused the envy of Tsar Nicholas I and the ire of the Jewish maskilim (members of the Jewish Enlightenment movement); the latter continually plotted to bring about the Rebbe's downfall. In 1838, at the height of a two-year investigation of the murder of two Jewish informers, the Rebbe was arrested by the governor-general of Berdichev on the accusation of complicity in the murders. He was brought before the Tsar, whose own agents told him that the Rebbe was trying to establish his own kingdom and was fomenting opposition to the government. The Tsar had the Rebbe jailed in Donevitz for seven months, and then placed in solitary confinement in prison in Kiev for fifteen months, pending a decision on exiling him to the Caucasus or Siberia. No formal charges were ever filed against him, and no trial was ever held. On 19 February 1840 (Shushan Purim 5600), the Rebbe was suddenly released. But he was still subject to the allegation of opposing the government and was placed under police surveillance at his home, which made it increasingly difficult for his Hasidim to visit him. The Rebbe decided to move to Kishinev, where the district authority was more lenient, and his family joined him. When his Hasidim found out through inside sources that the Tsar was going ahead with his plan to exile the Rebbe for his attempts to create a "Jewish kingdom", they bribed the governor of Kishinev to provide the Rebbe with an exit visa to Moldavia. Just as the Rebbe was leaving Kishinev, the government orders for his arrest and deportation arrived. When the Rebbe reached Iaşi, the capital of Moldavia, his Hasidim obtained for him a travel pass to cross the border into Austria. His plight became an international cause célèbre, with Hasidim and non-Hasidim throughout Eastern Europe petitioning government officials and even priests to save the Rebbe from extradition and exile.

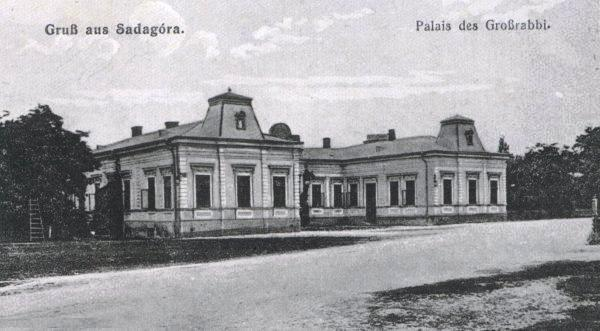
Partial view of the palace of the Grand Rabbi in Sadigura

Moving from town to town — including Shatsk in Bukovina (which belonged to Austria), Kompling, and Skole — the Rebbe ended up in Sadhora, Bukovina, home to the second-largest Jewish community in Austria (after Chernowitz). In that town, 40 years before, a 10-year-old boy named Yisroel Donenfeld had disappeared without a trace. The Rebbe presented himself as the long-lost Yisroel, and with the testimony of eight men who affirmed that he was born in Sadigura, he received citizenship papers. His Hasidim helped him purchase property in the town and show proof that he had 20,000 crowns for his support, whereupon he received honorary citizenship and the protection of the Austrian government. In the summer of 1842, the Rebbe's family was finally allowed to join him, on condition that they relinquish all rights to visit or return to Russia.

The Rebbe built another palatial home in Sadigura that was even more beautiful than the one he had left in Ruzhyn. His beis medrash (synagogue) accommodated 3,000 worshippers. Thousands of Hasidim crossed the border from throughout Galicia, Russia and Romania to be with him, and all the Jews in Sadigura became Ruzhiner Hasidim.

== Activities in Eretz Israel ==
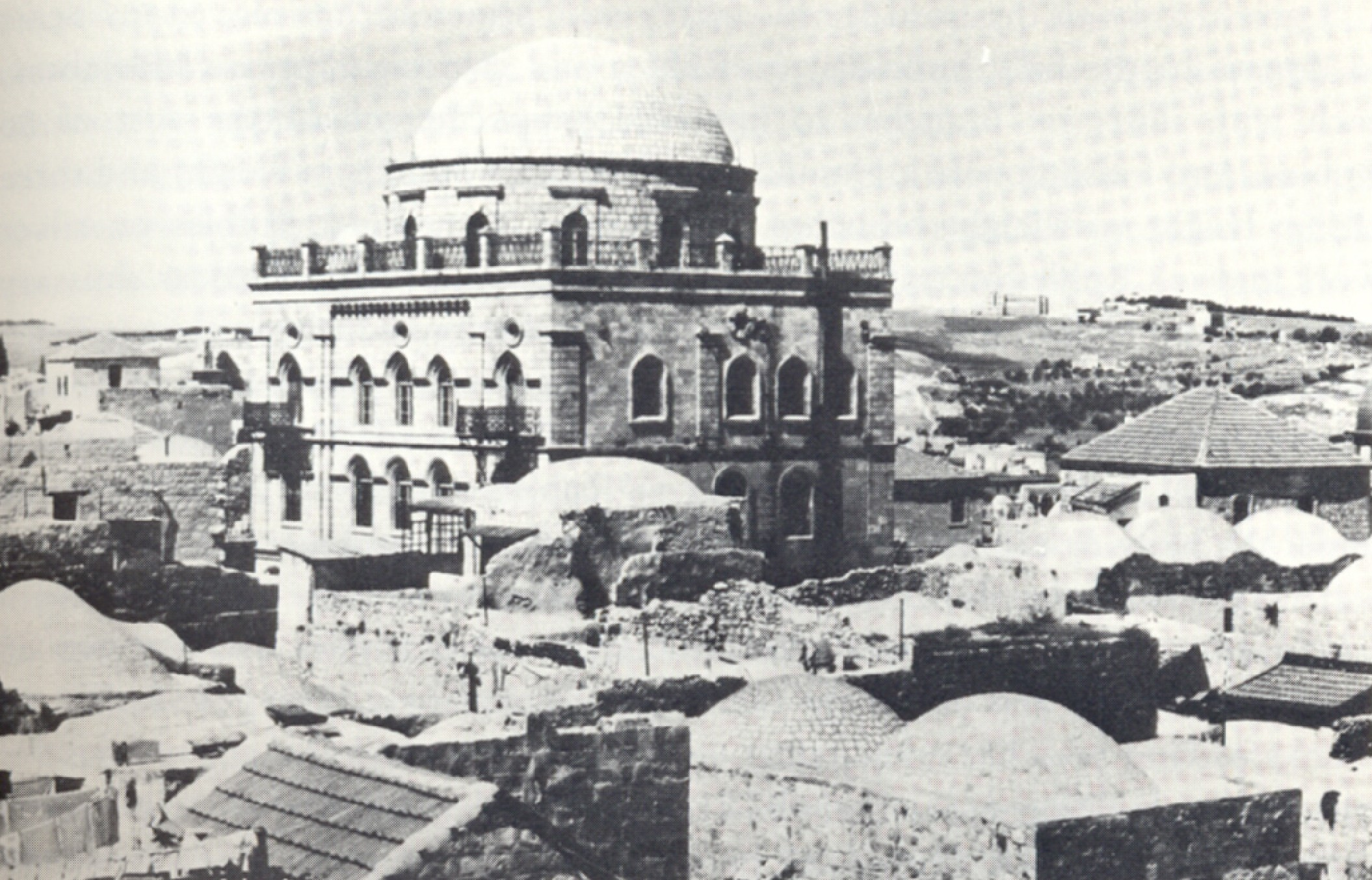
The Tiferes Yisrael Synagogue in Jerusalem was named after the Ruzhiner Rebbe, who instigated its construction.

The Apter Rav named the Ruzhiner Rebbe as president of Kollel Volhynia, with responsibility for raising and distributing the money to support the Hasidic community in the Land of Israel. The Rebbe encouraged Hasidim to emigrate and provided for their support through the kollel. Although he wished to make aliyah himself, he said that he could not leave his Hasidim.

In 1843, Rabbi Nissan Beck, a Ruzhiner Hasid, traveled from Jerusalem to Sadigura to visit the Rebbe. He informed him that Tsar Nicholas I intended to buy a plot of land next to the Western Wall with the intention of building a church and monastery there. The Rebbe gave Beck the task of thwarting the Tsar's attempt. Beck managed to buy the land from its Arab owners for an exorbitant sum, mere days before the Tsar ordered the Russian consul in Jerusalem to make the purchase for him. The Tsar was forced to buy a different plot of land for a church, which is known today as the Russian Compound. The Rebbe's son, Rabbi Avrohom Yaakov Friedman of Sadigura, completed the task of raising funds and inaugurated the building in the summer of 1872. The synagogue was named Tiferet Yisroel after the Ruzhiner Rebbe, Tiferet meaning "glory", though it was also known as the Nissan Beck Synagogue after its architect and builder.

The Rebbe died at the age of 54 on 9 October 1850 (3 Cheshvan 5610), probably due to heart failure, and was buried in Sadigura. On his deathbed he testified to his disciple, Rabbi Shneur Zalman of Fastan: "The holy master, Rabbi Yehudah HaNasi, Rabbeinu Hakadosh, testified about himself that he did not take pleasure from this world, even as much as a small finger. I bear self-witness, Heaven and Earth, that I did not take enjoyment from this world even as much as a slender thread. As for my behaving with overt leadership and pomp, this was all done to honor the Holy One, Blessed is He".

His gravesite, which eventually became the burial place of two of his sons, Avraham Yaakov of Sadigura and Dov Ber of Leova, as well as other family members, became a shrine for Ruzhiner Hasidim. His gravestone was destroyed during World War I and afterwards replaced by a large white concrete slab.

== Family ==
Friedman and his first wife, Sarah, had six sons and four daughters. These were:

- Sholom Yosef (Sadigura); he led his father's Hasidim, together with his brothers, for only a year until his death in 1851; his son, Rabbi Yitzchok, became the first Bohusher Rebbe
- Avrohom Yaakov (Sadigura)
- Menachem Nochum (Shtefenesht)
- Dov Ber (Leova)
- Dovid Moshe (Chortkov)
- Mordechai Shraga (Husyatin)
- Chaya Malka, whose second marriage was to Rabbi Yitzchak Twersky, first Rebbe of Skver
- Gittel Tova, wife of Yosef Monazon of Berdichev, scion of a wealthy banking family
- Miriam, wife of Rabbi Menachem Mendel Hager, first Rebbe of Vizhnitz
- Leah, wife of Dovid Halpern of Berdichev, scion of another wealthy banking family; their son Shalom Yosef (1856–1940) became the first Vasloi Rebbe in 1896

Shortly after the death of his wife Sarah in 1847, the Rebbe remarried to Malka, the widow of Rabbi Tzvi Hirsch of Rimanov. She had a seven-year-old girl and three-year-old boy from her first marriage; this second marriage did not produce children.

== Legacy ==
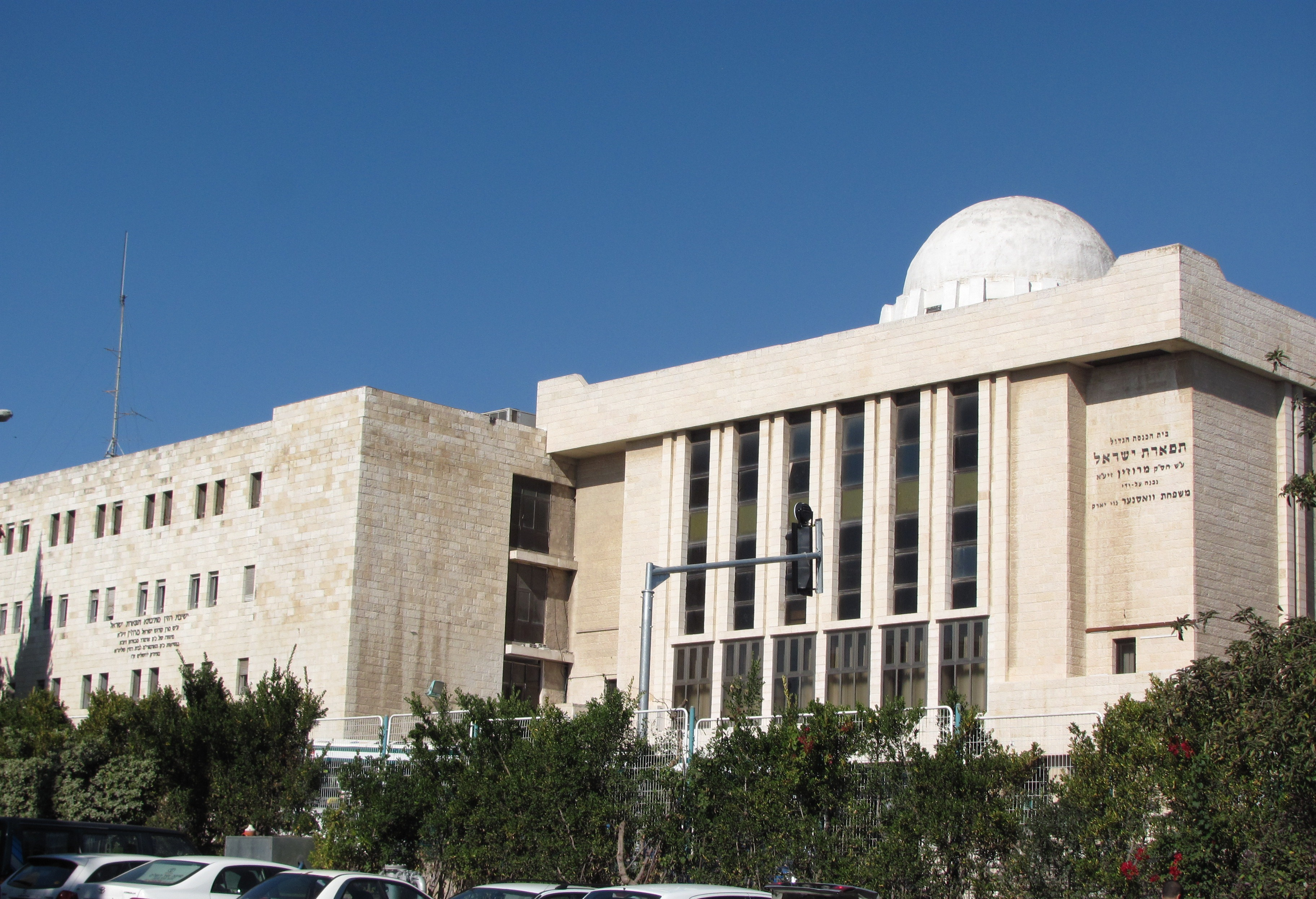
Ruzhiner yeshiva (left) and synagogue (right) in Jerusalem, both named Tiferet Yisroel after the Ruzhiner Rebbe.

The Rebbe did not write any sefarim (books); however, his sayings and teachings have been recorded by Ruzhiner Hasidim and biographers.

To this day, Ruzhiner institutions are named "Tiferet Yisroel" (Hebrew: תפארת ישראל, lit. "Splendor of Israel") after the Ruzhiner Rebbe. These include the Mesivta Tiferet Yisroel, the Ruzhiner Yeshiva in Jerusalem, established in 1957 by the Rebbe's great-grandson, the Boyaner Rebbe of New York.

== His progeny ==
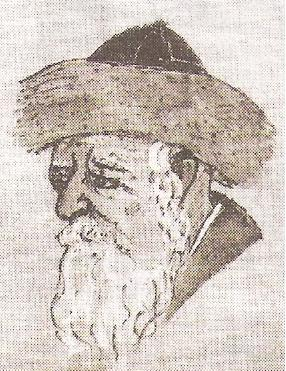
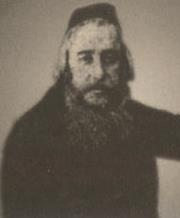
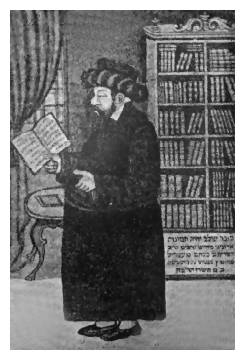
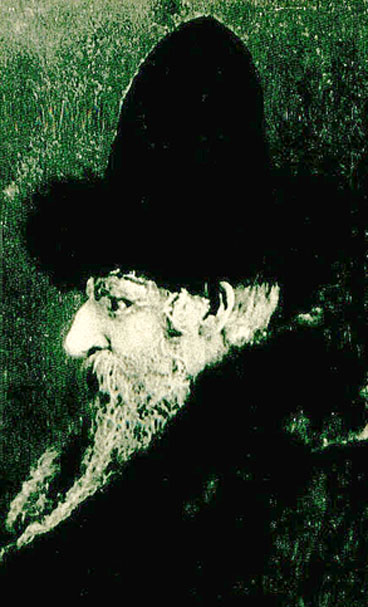
Shalom Yosef Friedman of Sadigura (1813–1851)
Yitzchak Twersky; 1st Rebbe of Skver (married to Chaya Malka [b. 1814])
Avrohom Yaakov Friedman (1819–1883); 1st Rebbe of Sadigura
Dov Ber Friedman of Leova (1822–1876)
Menachem Nochum Friedman (1823–1868); 1st Rebbe of Ștefănești
Yisroel Friedman (1796–1850); Rebbe of Ruzhin
Yosef Monazon of Berdychiv/Vandohan (married to Gittel Tova [b. 1822])
Menachem Mendel Hager; 1st Rebbe of Vizhnitz (married to Miriam [1826–1882])
Dovid Moshe Friedman (1828–1903); 1st Rebbe of Chortkov
Dovid Halpern of Berdychiv (married to Leah [b. 1830])
Mordechai Shraga Feivish Friedman (1834–1894); 1st Rebbe of Husiatyn

== See also ==
- Ruzhin (Hasidic dynasty)
