= Sholom Shachne of Prohobisht =

Hasidic Rabbi and father of the Ruzhiner Rebbe

Rabbi Sholom Shachne

Personal life
- Born: 1769 Velyki Mezhyrichi, Poland-Lithuania
- Died: 10 October 1802 (aged 32–33) Pohrebyshche, Podolia, Russian Empire
- Spouse: Chava
- Children: 4, including Yisrael Friedman of Ruzhin
- Parent: Avraham HaMalach (father)
- Dynasty: Ruzhin

Religious life
- Religion: Judaism

Jewish leader
- Dynasty: Ruzhin

Rabbi Sholom Shachne of Prohobisht (Hebrew: שלום שכנא מפראהביטש, romanized: Shalom Shachna m'Prhobisht), also known as Rabbi Sholom the Great (Yiddish: דער גרויסער רבי שלום, romanized: Der Groyser Rebbe Shalom) (1769 – 1802) was a Ukrainian rabbi and father of Rabbi Yisroel Friedman of Ruzhin.

== Biography ==
Sholom was born in Velyki Mezhyrichi to Rabbi Avraham HaMalach, son of Dov Ber, the Maggid of Mezeritch (the most prominent disciple of the Baal Shem Tov). He was named after his maternal grandfather, Shalom Shachne of Tortshin. He also claimed descent from the Royal line of David. His father died when he was eight years old. He and his older brother Israel Chaim were sent by their mother to live with their father's friend and grandfather's student, Rabbi Solomon of Karlin, in order for them to be raised in a household that taught them Hasidic values, having chosen the disciple of her father-in-law as the best choice.

When he was young, he married his wife Chava, the daughter of Abraham of Korostychiv and the granddaughter of Rabbi Menachem Nachum of Chernobyl. He and Chava had four children. Rabbi Yisroel, Avraham, Dov Ber (who died in childhood), and Chaya Ita.

His grandfather-in-law, Menachem, moved to serve as Maggid in the city of Chernobyl, and the role of Maggid in Prohobisht was given to him. As Maggid, he taught students from all over Ukraine, among who was Rabbi Nathan of Breslov, who even mentions Sholom in his writings, Sholom's brother-in-law, Yisrael ben Shlomo Charif, and his son-in-law, Rabbi Aryeh Leib of Bandar, brother of Rabbi Moshe Zvi of Savran. Sholom was considered unique in presentation, wearing fashionable clothes accented with actual gold, and also lived in an expensive house with a manicured garden.

Following his death, his son Avraham became the Maggid of Prohibisht, but died a decade into his tenure, in 1813. Avrochom's widow, the granddaughter of Rabbi David Leykes, received a halizah from Yisroel and married Rabbi Yosef David Malik. Sholom's daughter, Chaya Ita, married Rabbi Yitzhak of Granov, son of Rabbi Mordechai of Kremnitz. Her descendants include Rabbi Avrohom Yitzchok Kohn, Rabbi of Toldos Aharon. Sholom's final son Dov Ber, died during his father's reign, and was engaged to the daughter of Rabbi Levi Yitzchok of Berditchev.

== Legacy ==
Many prominent rabbis of his generation revered him due to his great character and greatness in his Hasidic and Talmudic morals. It is said that Aryeh Leib of Shpola said to him "[Avraham HaMalach] was an Angel, so his mother was angelic. No wonder they had a son like that." Nathan of Breslov said after his death, "In Prohobisht there was a great light that fell and left behind a great darkness." His Yisrael of Bafalia, the author of the book "The Crown of Israel", mentioned Sholom a lot in his writing and often described him with titles of high prestige, such as Tzadik. It is customary among members of the Ruzhin dynasty to mention his name on Shabbos in hopes for a good Shabbat, stemming from Sholom's saying that if you talk about righteous people on a Friday night, it is a virtue for a gutn Shabbos.

== Family tree ==
Ancestors of Sholom Shachne of Prohobisht

8. Avraham
4. Dov Ber of Mezeritch
9.
2. Avraham HaMalach
10. Meshulam Faybush Horowitz of Kremenets
5. Chava Horowitz
11.
1. Sholom Shachne
12.
6. Shalom Shachne of Torchyn
13.
3. Tveria Kalisk
14.
7.
