= Avraham HaMalach =

18th-century Hasidic Rabbi

Rabbi Avraham HaMalach HaTzadik

Personal life
- Born: 1739 Mezeritch, Poland-Lithuania
- Died: 25 September 1776 (aged 36-37) Fastov, Kiev, Russian Empire
- Spouse: Tveria Kalisk
- Children: Israel Chaim of Ludmir, Sholom Shachne of Prohobisht
- Parent: Maggid of Mezeritch (father)

Religious life
- Religion: Judaism
- Denomination: Hasidism
- Yahrtzeit: 12 Tishrei

Avraham HaMalach (Hebrew: אברהם המלאך, lit. 'Abraham the Angel'; also Abraham ben Dov Ber Friedman; 1739 – 25 September 1776) was an 18th-century Hasidic Rabbi and son of the Maggid of Mezeritch. He is well-known for his extreme piety and observance of asceticism, the source of his nickname, "the Angel".

== Biography ==
Friedman, born in Mezeritch, was the son of Dov Ber, the Maggid of Mezeritch and the Maggid's wife, Chava, daughter of the Rabbi Meshulam Faybush Horowitz of Kremenets. According to Hasidic tradition, the couple were unable to have a child, and Chava wanted to divorce her husband, but he met with the Baal Shem Tov, and the Besht said that Chava would have their long-awaited child, and that the child would become a saint. Chava discovered she was pregnant within the year.

He showed an affinity for Kabbalah from a young age. At the request of his father, he studied with Shneur Zalman of Liadi, who taught him the Babylonian Talmud and the commentaries of Rashi and Tosafists with a Hasidic viewpoint. During this period in his young years, he began his ascent into asceticism, only seeing a few of his close friends, including the Schneur and his schoolmate Menachem Nachum Twersky, and Friedman became the local Maggid. He would lock himself in a room with Tefillin and Tallit and only eat a little bit of food a day.

Another example of his asceticism came from when Rabbi Yitzhak of Radvil came to visit him on Tisha B'av, only to see him in meditation in mourning the destruction of the two temples, crying. He came back to the synagogue the next day to see him still on the floor, surrounded in a "puddle of his tears".

Although hesitant to marry because of the physicality of marriage, his father convinced him to marry for the sanctity of its mitzvah, and he married Tveria Kalisk, and they had two sons together. Israel Chaim of Ludmir and Sholom Shachne of Prohobisht. Sholom's son, Yisrael, would go on to found the Ruzhin Hassidic dynasty, and would be the ancestor of 6 others. Friedman never took over his father's position as the Maggid of Mezeritch, and settled in Fastov, where he remained an ascetic recluse until his death on 26 September 1776 (12 Tishrei 5537).

== Works ==
Friedman is the author of Chesed l'Abraham (not to be confused with the work of Abraham Azulai of the same name), mainly structured like a Torah commentary, but also discusses the Mishnah, the Talmud, and the Jewish holidays. The book also contains many personal sermons of the author, as well as a critique on the degeneration of the study of Kabbalah within Hasidism. It was first printed in Czernowitz in 1850.
