= Avrohom Yaakov Friedman =

Avrohom Yaakov Friedman may refer to:

- Avrohom Yaakov Friedman (first Sadigura rebbe) (1820-1883)
- Avrohom Yaakov Friedman (third Sadigura rebbe) (1884-1961)
- Avrohom Yaakov Friedman (fifth Sadigura rebbe) (1928-2013)
