= Nahalat Yitzhak Cemetery =

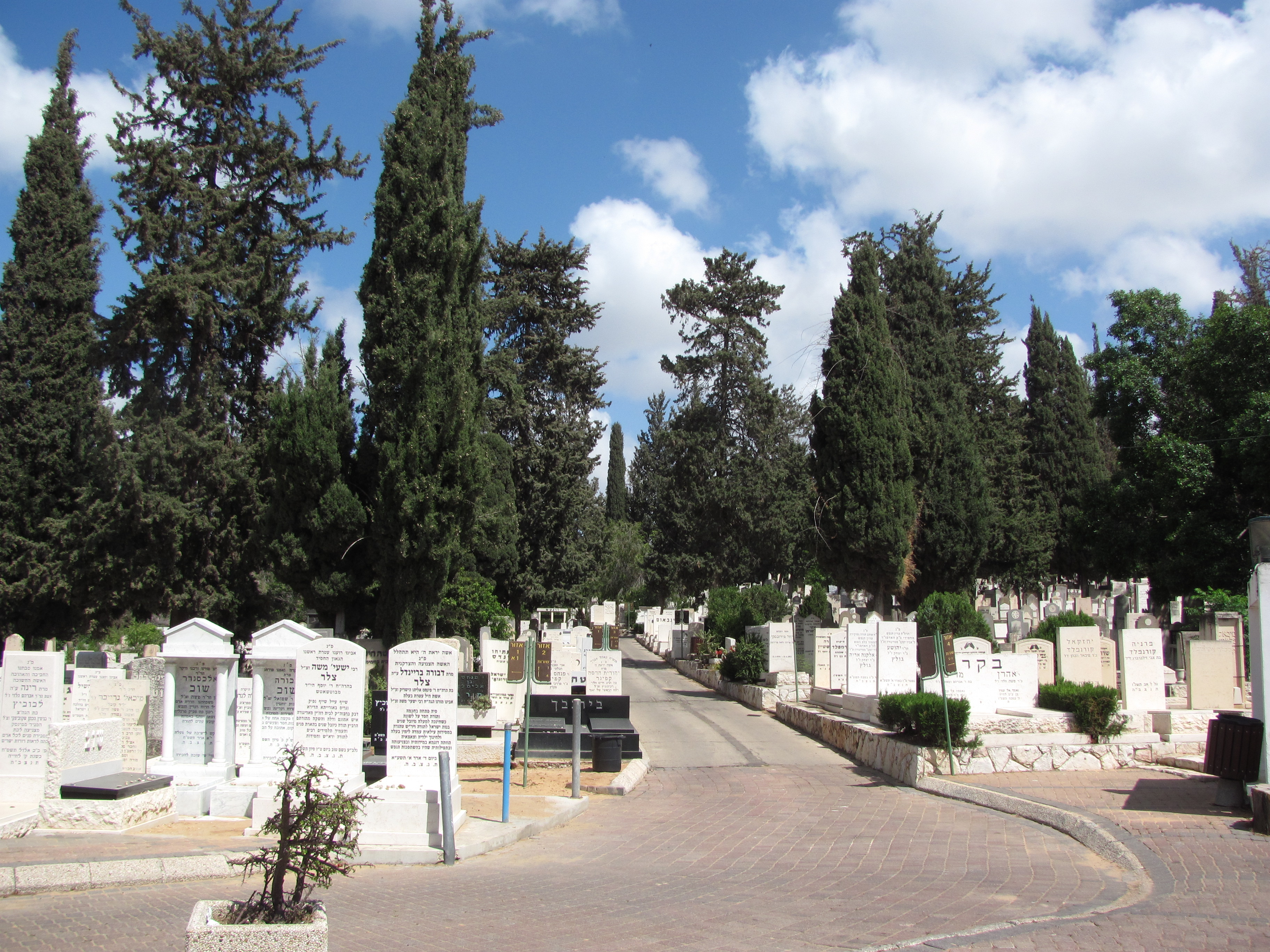
- Interactive map of Nahalat Yitzhak Cemetery

Details
- Established: 1932
- Location: Givatayim, Tel Aviv District
- Country: Israel
- Coordinates: 32.072°N 34.804°E
- Size: 86,000 square metres (930,000 sq ft)
- No. of graves: 30,000
- Find a Grave: Nahalat Yitzhak Cemetery

Nahalat Yitzhak Cemetery (Hebrew: בית העלמין נחלת יצחק) is a Jewish municipal burial ground in the Tel Aviv District city of Givatayim, Israel, east of the Nahalat Yitzhak neighborhood of Tel Aviv. Founded in 1932, it includes more than 30,000 graves, including those of Israeli political and cultural figures, and Rebbes of several Hasidic dynasties. The cemetery contains several tracts of military graves and mass graves of unidentified soldiers from the period of the 1948 Arab-Israeli War. It also features memorials to Jewish communities destroyed in the Holocaust.

The cemetery is operated by the Chevra Kadisha of Greater Tel Aviv. The National Insurance Institute has declared it a "closed" cemetery, although burials occasionally take place here for people who pre-purchased their plots.

== History ==
The area for the Nahalat Yitzhak Cemetery was purchased by the Chevra Kadisha of Greater Tel Aviv in response to the population growth in Tel Aviv and the increasingly limited space in the city's first municipal burial ground, the Trumpeldor Cemetery. The Chevra Kadisha acquired a 50 dunams (0.050 km^{2}; 0.019 sq mi) field located far from the city, on the eastern side of the Ayalon River. The site could be accessed only via a dirt road leading from a wadi, whose sides were very steep. During heavy rains, when the river overflowed its banks into the wadi, the site became completely inaccessible. Consequently, the Chevra Kadisha used its own money to pay for the construction of a concrete bridge to span the river and bring people to the cemetery.

Nahalat Yitzhak Cemetery was dedicated on 30 June 1932 (26 Sivan 5692). Together with the neighborhood that grew up around it, it was named for Rabbi Yitzchak Elchanan Spektor, Chief Rabbi of Kovno, Lithuania.

== Description ==
The cemetery consists of two sections separated by a narrow road. The eastern (original) section has a central avenue that extends 700 metres (2,300 ft). It is lined with benches and shady corners for visitors to rest and reflect. Seventy-six tracts were demarcated astride this avenue and terraced slopes planted with trees, flowers and grassy areas were installed. In total, the cemetery contains approximately 30,000 graves, including 7,500 graves of children.

== Military graves ==
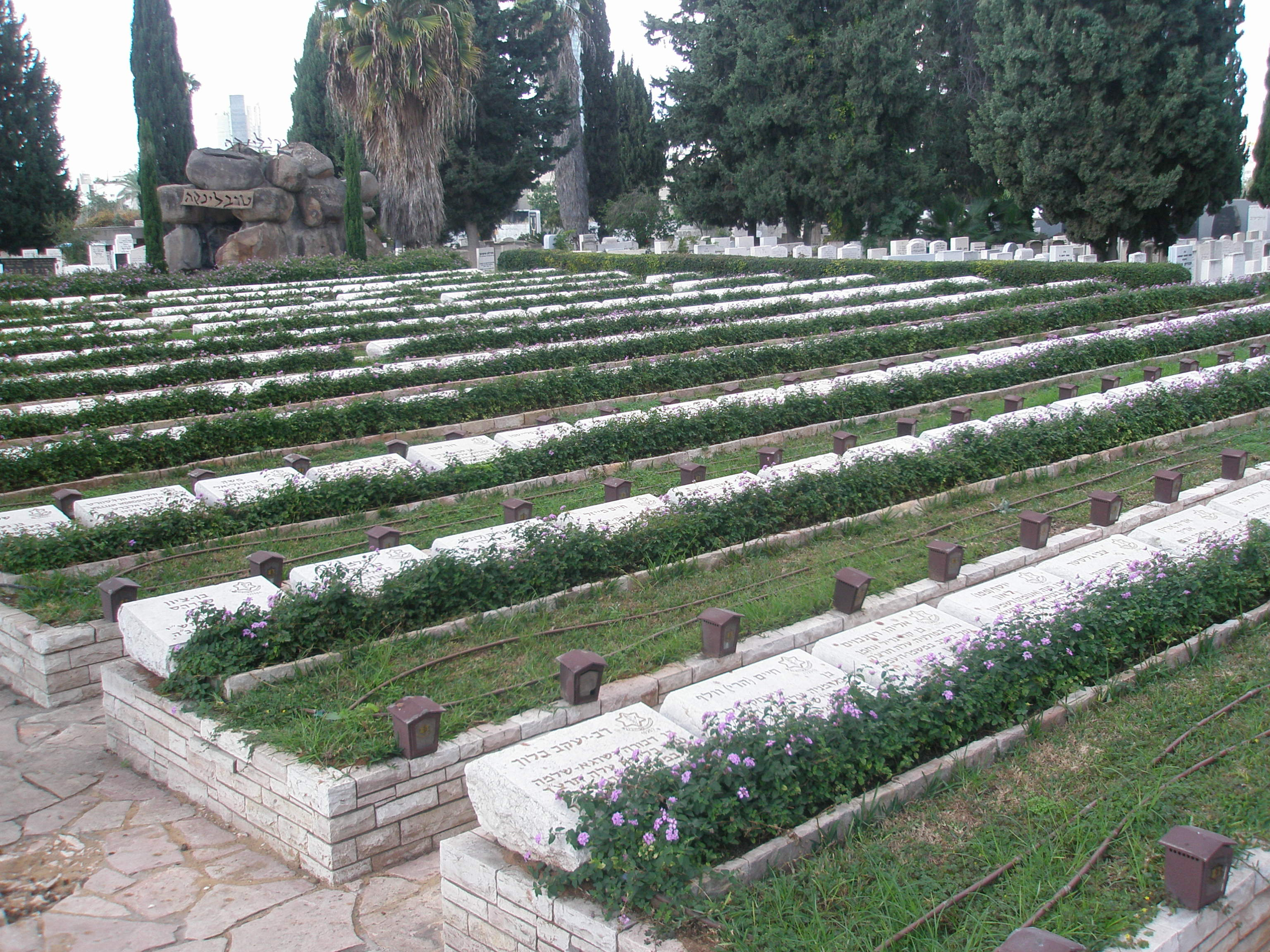
Military graves at Nahalat Yitzhak Cemetery

Military graves at Nahalat Yitzhak Cemetery include a mass grave for Haganah soldiers killed between 1934 and 1936, graves and memorials for members of Jewish underground groups (Haganah, Irgun, and Lehi), and several tracts of graves for soldiers killed in the 1948 Arab-Israeli War.

During that war, military burials were often performed hurriedly and full documentation was not performed. Re-identification of bodies was subsequently carried out decades later. In one case, a soldier listed as missing in action was discovered to be buried in one of the mass graves at Nahalat Yitzhak Cemetery; in 2013 his name was added to the monument to fallen soldiers in the cemetery.

== Notable burials ==
=== Political and paramilitary figures ===
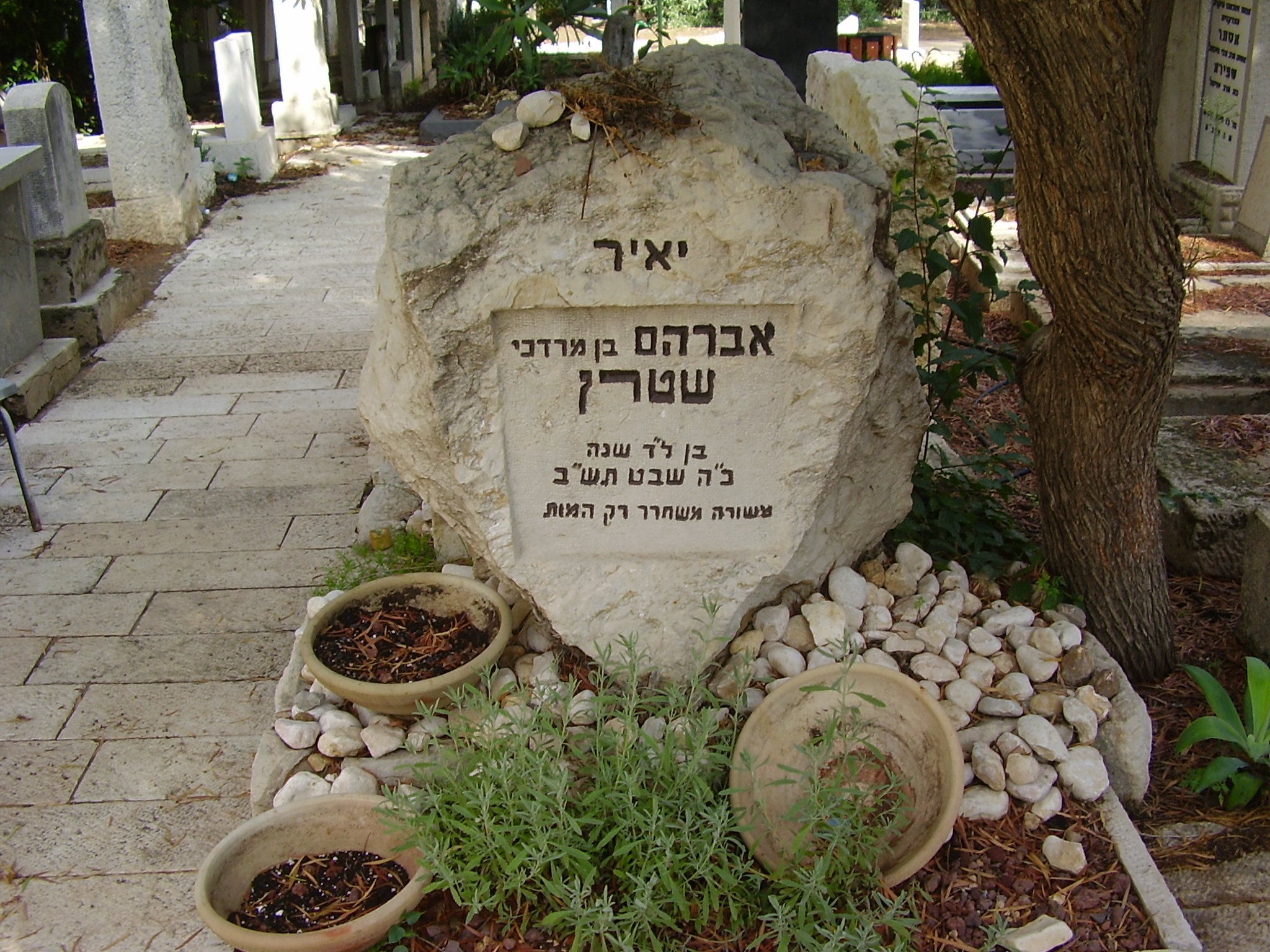
Grave of Avraham Stern.

- Abba Ahimeir (1897–1962), ideologue of Revisionist Zionism
- Moshe Avigdor Amiel, Chief Rabbi of Tel Aviv, 1936–1945
- Hansi Brand (1912–2000), Hungarian Zionist activist
- Joel Brand (1906–1964), Hungarian Zionist activist
- Avraham Cholodenko (1871–1942), Liberal Zionist activist.
- Isaiah Jarcho (1871–1941), Russian-American Zionist and first Director of Ahuza Aleph Raanana and owner of Gan Rena outdoor theater in Tel Aviv.
- Rudolf Kastner (1906–1957), Hungarian Zionist activist
- Ya'akov Meridor (1913–1995), Revisionist Zionist activist, Irgun commander and Israeli politician
- Ya'akov Rusonik (1928–1948), Polish Jew and Zionist, member of the "Lechi" (a.k.a. "The Stern Gang").
- Avraham Stern (1907–1942), head of the "Stern Gang" paramilitary organization
- Eliyahu Tamler (1919–1948), Irgun commander

=== Cultural figures ===
- Jiří Langer (1894–1943), Hebrew poet
- Moshe Schnitzer (1921–2007), President of the Israel Diamond Exchange

=== Hasidic rebbes ===
Nahalat Yitzhak Cemetery is the resting place of Rebbes from the Sadigura, Shtefanesht, Bohush, Sassov, and Strozinitz Hasidic dynasties. They include:

- Rabbi Avrohom Mattisyohu Friedman (1847–1933), second Shtefaneshter Rebbe. Though Friedman died and was buried in Romania, his gravesite was threatened with demolition in the 1960s and his Hasidim paid to reinter his remains in Israel. He was reburied in the Nahalat Yitzhak Cemetery in 1968 in a funeral attended by thousands. Every year on his yahrtzeit (anniversary of death), thousands of Jews come to pray at his grave.
- Rabbi Avrohom Yaakov Friedman, (1884–1961), third Sadigura Rebbe
- Rabbi Avrohom Yaakov Friedman, (1928–2013), fifth Sadigura Rebbe
- Rabbi Mordechai Sholom Yosef Friedman (1897–1979), fourth Sadigura Rebbe
- Rabbi Yisrael Moshe Friedman (1955–2020), sixth Sadigura Rebbe

== Memorials ==
=== Altalena memorial ===
The first memorial to the 16 Irgun fighters and 3 IDF soldiers who perished in the 1948 sinking of the Altalena cargo ship was erected in the Nahalat Yitzhak Cemetery in 1998, where gravesites of the fallen are located. Starting with Prime Minister Menachem Begin, all Prime Ministers of Israel attend the annual state memorial service at the cemetery, which is held on the day of the sinking.

=== Holocaust memorials ===
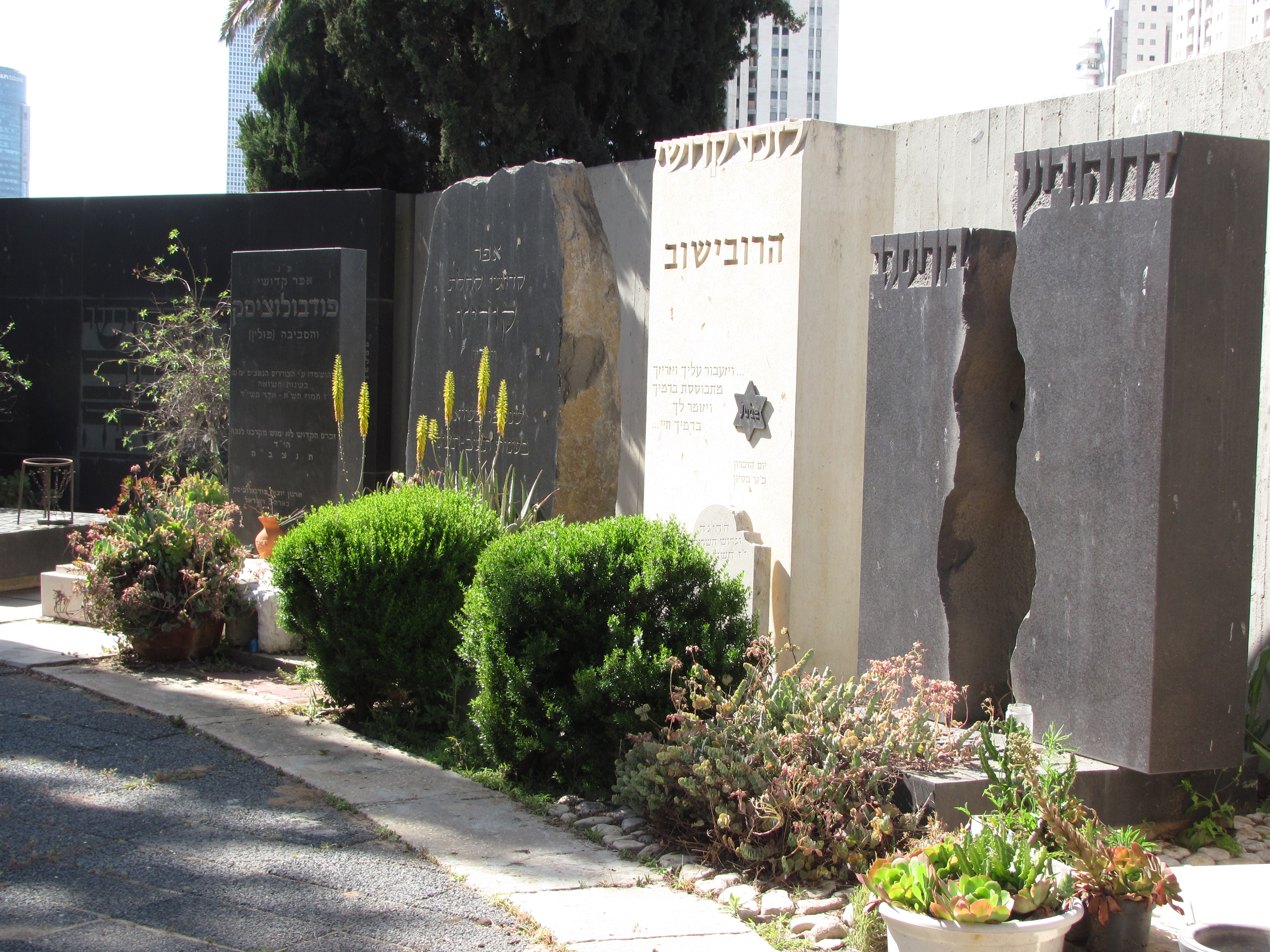
(R. to l.) Holocaust memorials to the destroyed communities of Drohobych and Borysław, Harovishov, Koritz, and Podwolocyska.

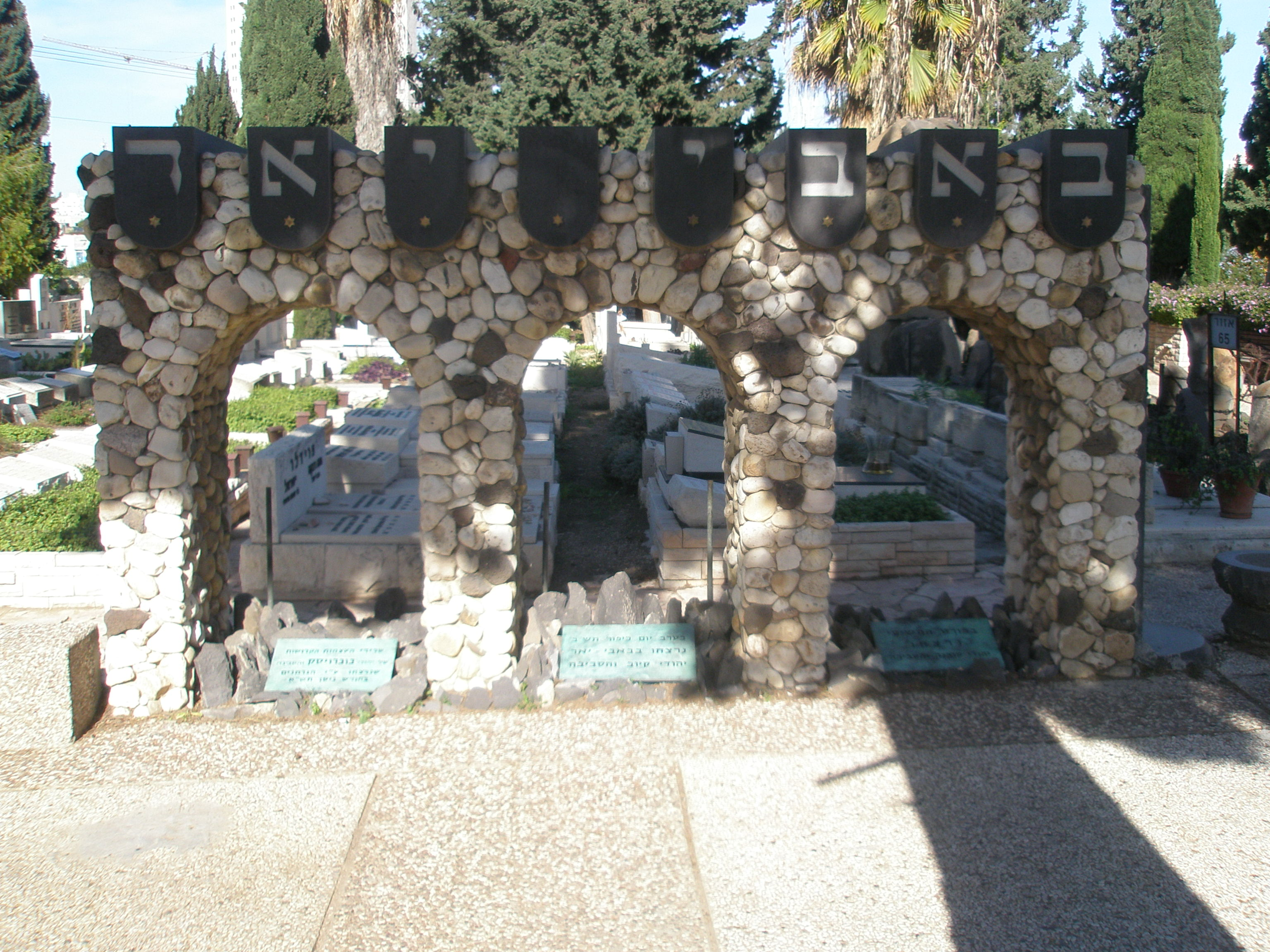
Babi Yar memorial

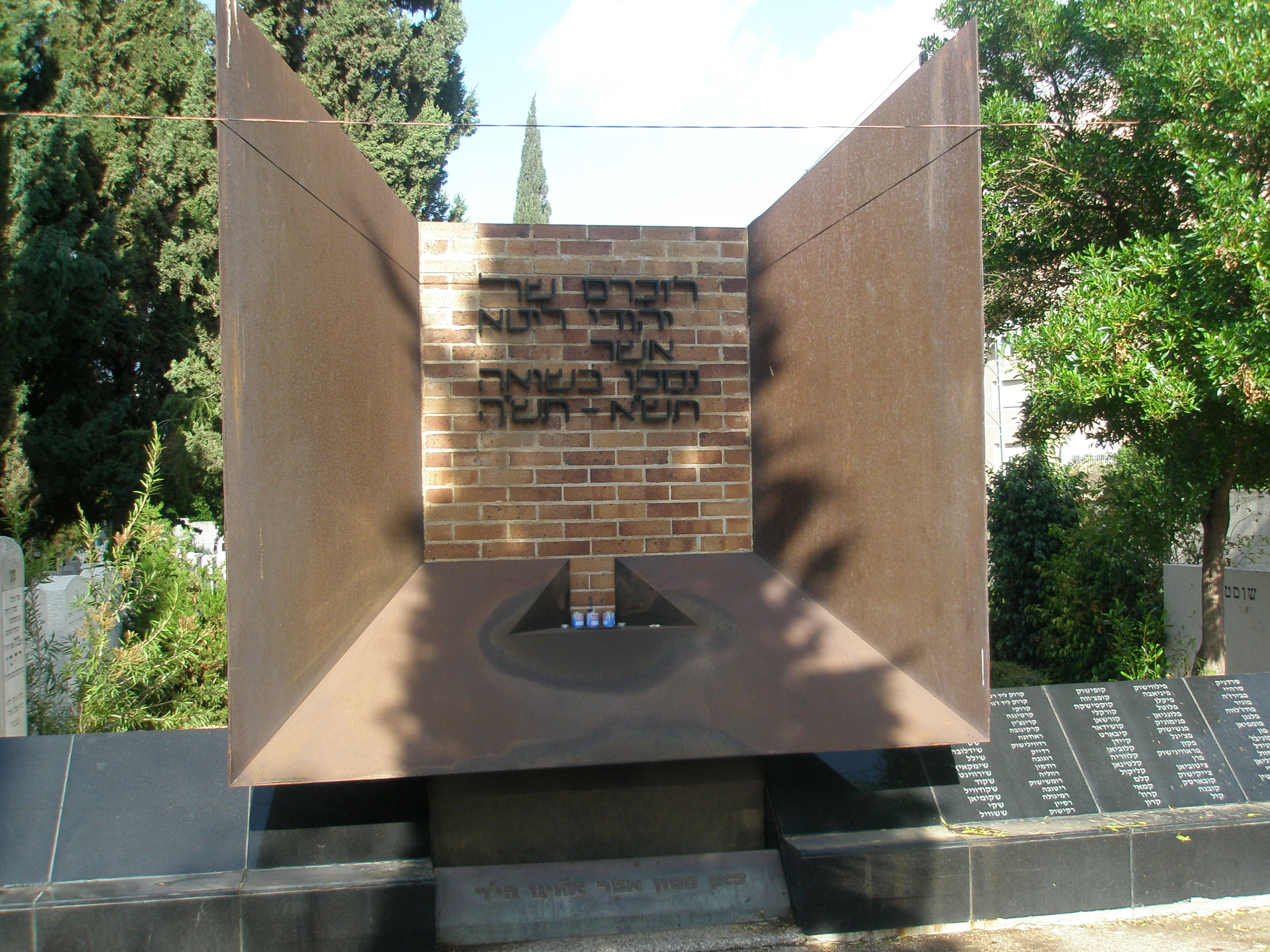
Lithuania memorial

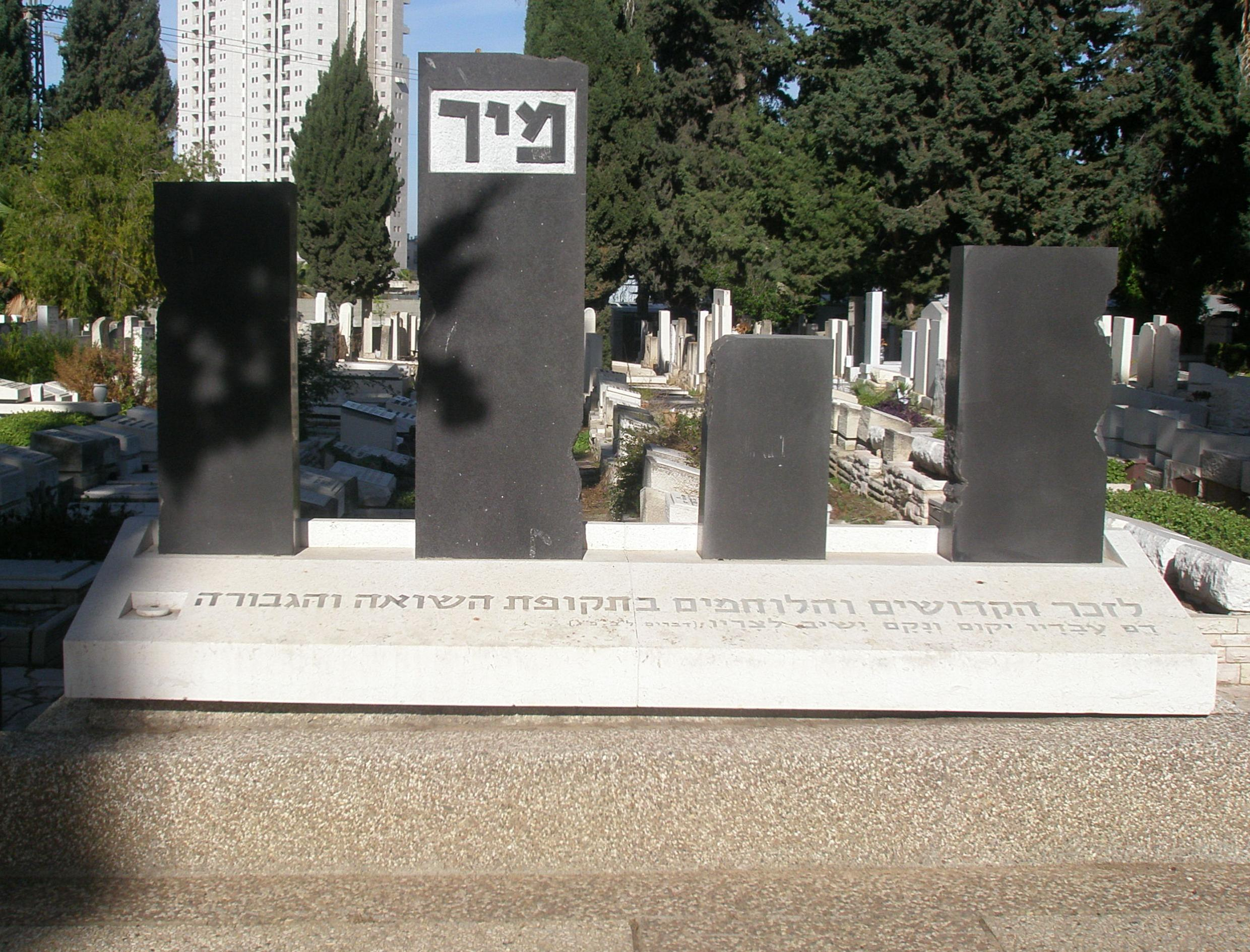
Mir memorial

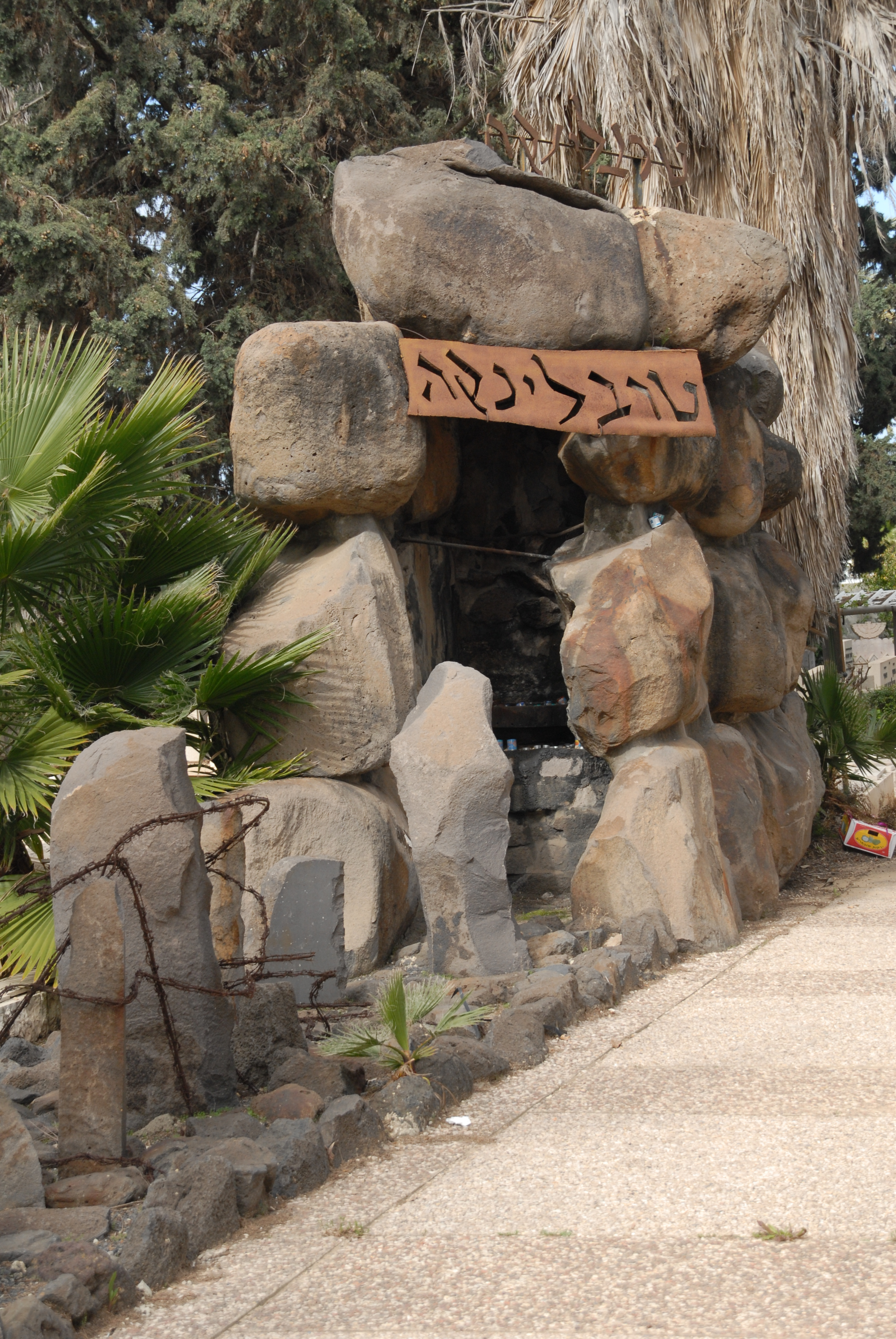
Treblinka memorial

Nahalat Yitzhak Cemetery is the site of more than a dozen memorials to Jewish communities destroyed during the Holocaust, paid for by the survivors of those communities. Under many memorials are reinterred the ashes of Jewish victims. Large memorials to the destroyed shtetls of Lithuania and Lida, and victims of the Babi Yar massacre, feature prominently along the central avenue of the western section of the cemetery. More than a dozen smaller memorials are arranged in a group along the northern wall of this section. Memorial services are held by survivors of the respective shtetls on Israel's Yom HaShoah (National Holocaust Remembrance Day), or on the date of that community's massacre. The Holocaust memorials include:

==== Babi Yar ====
The memorial to the victims of Babi Yar, in the shape of three connected stone arches with the name "Babi Yar" spelled out in Hebrew letters (Hebrew: באבי יאר), also commemorates the decimated Jewish communities of Bobruisk, Kovno, and Kiev with small brass plaques at the base of each arch. The memorial was erected over bone fragments from Babi Yar that were reinterred at the cemetery. The bones were brought out of Ukraine by three American college students in July 1971. The memorial was dedicated in 1972 by Israeli Prime Minister Golda Meir. The memorial is the site of an annual memorial ceremony on Yom HaShoah.

==== Drohobych and Borysław ====
A memorial to these decimated Ukrainian communities was erected in the late 1950s by the Association of Former Residents of Drohobycz, Borysław and Surrounding Towns, and an annual memorial service held here.

==== Lithuanian Jewry ====
The memorial to Lithuanian Jews killed in the Holocaust was unveiled in 1981 by the Association of Lithuanian Jews in Israel. The original monument included the names of 224 destroyed Lithuanian shtetls in raised bronze lettering. Remains of Jews executed at the Ninth Fort in Kaunas, Lithuania, were buried under the monument. In 2007 the monument was refurbished and the names of the shtetls were engraved on two black granite slabs on its base.

==== Mir, Belarus ====
The Mir memorial was erected by former residents of that town in 1950. An annual memorial ceremony is held here on the anniversary of the 9 November 1941 massacre of the inhabitants of the Mir Ghetto.

==== Podwolocyska, Ukraine ====
The Committee for the Organization of Ex-Citizens of Podwolocyska established this memorial, which incorporates blood-soaked earth gathered from the mass grave in that shtetl. A memorial service is held here each year on 7 Tammuz, the date of the massacre of the Jews of Podwolocyska.

==== Treblinka ====
A memorial to Jews murdered at the Treblinka extermination camp was erected in 1963 by the Chief Rabbi of Tel Aviv-Jaffa, Rabbi Yitzhak Yedidya Frankel. Frankel constructed the stone memorial after traveling to Poland with an Israeli delegation in 1963 to attend a Polish government ceremony commemorating the 20th anniversary of the Warsaw Ghetto Uprising. On their side trip to the Treblinka extermination camp, Frankel witnessed a field strewn with human bones, and was told that while the locals continually tried to bury and even pour asphalt over the mass grave, the bones continually rose to the surface. Frankel gathered up some of the bones in a newspaper and returned with them to Tel Aviv, where he built the memorial and buried the bones beneath it.
