= Baruch Weisbecker =

Israeli rabbi (1940–2024)

Rabbi Rabbi Baruch Weisbecker
- ברוך ויסבקר
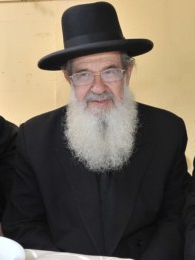

Personal life
- Born: 21 November 1940 Tel Aviv, Mandatory Palestine
- Died: 2 February 2024 (aged 83)
- Parents: Rabbi Moshe Weisbecker (father); Tsvia Weisbecker (mother)
- Education: Ponovezh Yeshiva

Religious life
- Religion: Judaism

Jewish leader
- Position: Rosh Yeshiva
- Yeshiva: Beit Mattityahu Yeshiva, Bnei Brak

Baruch Weisbecker (Hebrew: ברוך ויסבקר; 21 November 1940 – 2 February 2024) was an Israeli rabbi, the rosh yeshiva of Beit Mattityahu in Bnei Brak, and a member of the Moetzes Gedolei HaTorah.

== Early life and education ==
Baruch Weisbecker was born on Nahalat Yitzhak street in Tel Aviv to Mr. Moshe and Tsvia Weisbecker. He began his education at the Bnei Akiva Yeshivat Kfar Haroeh, later moving to the prestigious Ponevezh Yeshiva in Bnei Brak under the guidance of Rabbi Moshe Tsvi Nerya. At Ponevezh, he studied under notable figures such as Rabbi Elazar Menachem Man Shach and Rabbi Shmuel Rozovsky. Rabbi Weisbecker is considered one of Rav Shmuel's prime successors and one of the foremost teachers of his derech halimud. Participating in Rabbi Shmuel Markovich’s mentoring program "Ha-ilan" at Ponevezh (where an older student has a chavruta with a younger student), he was paired with Rabbi Eliyahu Baruch Finkel, one of Mir’s Rosh Yeshiva, as an Avrech.

== Career ==
His early years saw him serving as Rosh Mesivta at Kol Torah Yeshiva in Jerusalem, Bayit VeGan street and then at Beit Hatalmud yeshiva. In 1981, he founded Beit Matityau Yeshiva. Rabbi Weisbecker also established two additional Yeshivas: Maor Itzhak in Hemed, headed by his son-in-law Rabbi Menahem Yaakovson, and Tiferet Haim Yeshiva for Edot HaMizrach, which was part of the Rambam Yeshiva institutions in Tel Aviv until its closure in 2014.

In 2020, after more than 200 students at Best Mattiyahu tested positive for COVID-19, reports emerged alleging that Weisbecker had discouraged or prevented students from being tested for the virus.

In Kislev 2021, Rabbi Weisbecker was appointed a member of Moetzes Gedolei HaTorah.

His teaching methodology emphasizes "Iyun" (in-depth study) over "Bekiut" (broad, surface-level learning), His study method is based on foundational concepts derived from the Orders of Nashim and Nezikin.

== Personal life ==
Rabbi Weisbecker married Sara Lea Drabkin in the early 1960s. She is the daughter of Rabbi Eliyahu Yeruham Drabkin, the Rabbi of Hod Hasharon, and sister to Rabbi Tsvi Drabkin, Rosh Yeshiva of Grodna in Be'er Ya'akov.

In 2022, Weisbecker was diagnosed with cancer. He died on 2 February 2024, at the age of 83.
