= Moetzes Gedolei HaTorah =

Rabbinical council of the Agudat Yisrael and Degel HaTorah

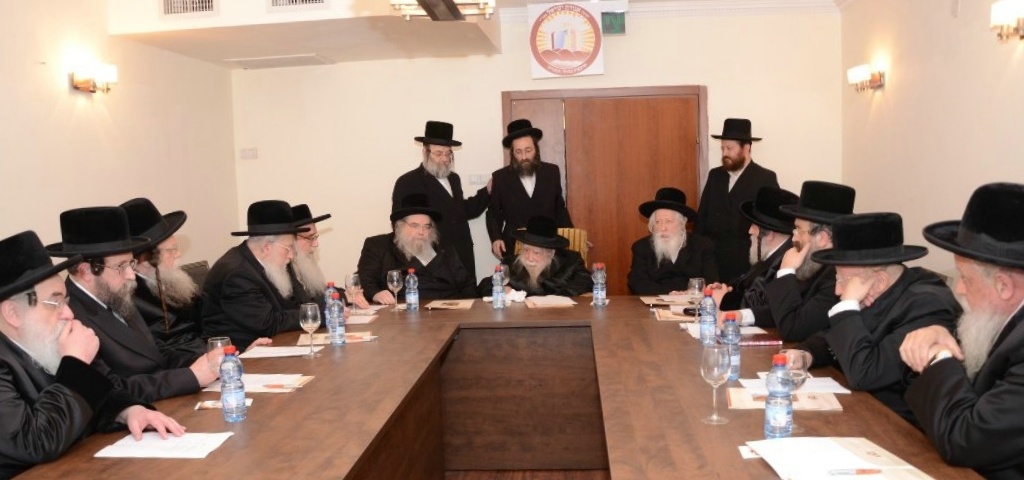
Moetzes Agudas Yisroel meeting, February 2013, with 12 of 13 members present; from l-r: Vizhnitz-Merkaz Rebbe; Boyaner Rebbe; Modzitzer Rebbe; Slonimer Rebbe; Sanzer Rebbe; Belzer Rebbe; Erlauer Rebbe; Gerrer Rebbe; Vizhnitzer Rebbe; Sadigura Rebbe; Biala Rebbe; Bostoner Rebbe (not in photo: Serit-Vizhnitzer Rebbe)

Moetzes Gedolei HaTorah (Hebrew: מועצת גדולי התורה, "Council of great Torah [Sages]") is the supreme rabbinical policy-making council of the Agudat Yisrael and Degel HaTorah movements in Israel; and of Agudath Israel of America in the United States. Members are usually prestigious Roshei Yeshiva (heads of yeshivas) or Hasidic rebbes, who are also usually regarded by many Haredi Jews to be the Gedolim ("great/est") sages of Torah Judaism. Before the Holocaust, it was the supreme authority for the World Agudath Israel in Europe.

== Name ==
The component words of the name are transliterated in a variety of ways. This is frequently done as Moetzet, and less frequently as Gedolai and ha-Torah or ha Torah. The phrase is regularly shortened to Moetzes or The Moetzah.

== History ==
=== Europe ===
Prior to World War II, only one such body existed, the World Agudath Israel. The Council of Torah Sages was established following the establishment of Agudath Israel in Katowice in 1912. It was decided at the time that two councils would be set up for the movement: a council of homeowners, and a council of rabbis, composed of leading rabbis from around the world.

=== United States ===
The Moetzes of Agudath Israel of America serve as religious decisors, leadership, and political and policy liaisons with state and federal government agencies on behalf of many American Haredi Jews. The council, consisting primarily of rosh yeshivas and Hasidic rebbes, directs Agudath's policies and leadership. Formerly known as the Moetzet Chachmei HaTorah, the body was founded in 1948. It sets all major policies, and guides the organization according to its precepts of Da'as Torah.

=== Israel ===
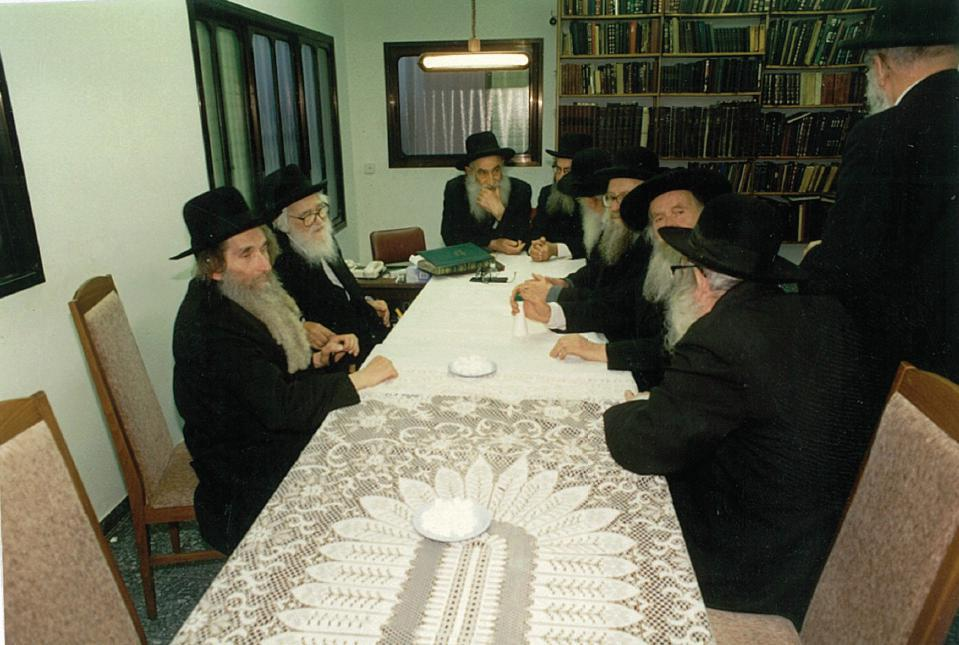
The first Moetzes Gedolei HaTorah of "Degel HaTorah", March 1989, home of Rabbi Schach. Sitting alongside Rabbi Steinman

The Moetzes of Agudat Yisrael likewise constituted the Israeli Ashkenazic Haredi community's religious policy leadership, and exercises strong control over political matters for strongly observant Israelis, such as joining government coalitions.

Prior to Degel HaTorah's late 1980s break from Agudat Israel (because of the dominance of the Polish Hasidic groups), there was only one Moetzes Gedolei HaTorah in Israel. With the breakaway of the Lithuanian/"yeshivish" faction (led by Rabbi Elazar Shach), two separate, at times complementary, councils were created.

The Haredi Sephardi Jews of Israel had also at one time followed the leadership of the Moetzet of Agudat Yisrael when it was still a body that generally spoke for most of Israel's Haredim. Eventually, however, the Haredi Sephardim broke with their Ashkenazi counterparts (again because of the dominance of the Polish Hasidic groups), and established the Moetzet Chachmei HaTorah ("Council of [wise] Torah Sages"), which in turn became the source for the formulation and expression of the policies and agenda of the Shas political party in the Israeli Knesset. Rabbi Ovadiah Yosef became the main leadership figure of this council.

== Members – Europe ==
In Katowice (Kattowitz), German Empire in 1912 appointed to the council were Rabbi Avraham Mordechai Alter (1866–1948) Rebbe of Ger (Chairman), Rabbi Sholom Dovber Schneerson Rebbe of Chabad, Rabbi Chaim Soloveitchik, Rabbi Yitzchak Isaac Halevy, Rabbi Meir Simcha of Dvinsk, Rabbi Chaim Ozer Grodzinski, Rabbi Itzela of Ponevezh, Rabbi Shlomo Zalman Breuer, Rabbi Ze'ev Feilchenfeld of Posen, Rabbi David Zvi Hoffmann, Rabbi Kopel Reich of Budapest.

At the great congress in Vienna in 1923, the Council included: the Chofetz Chaim, the Gerrer Rebbe, Rabbi Yisroel Friedman the Chortkov Rebbe, Rabbi Chaim Ozer Grodzinski, Rabbi Meir Arik, Rabbi Yitzchak Zelig Morgenstern the Admor of Sokolov, Rabbi Mordechai Yosef Elazar Leiner the Admor of Radzin, Rabbi Meir Dan Plotzky, Rabbi Moshe Mordechai Epstein, Rabbi Meir Shapira of Lublin, Rabbi Avraham Mendel Steinberg of Brod, Rabbi Kalman Weber of Piestany, and Rabbi Shlomo Zalman Breuer.

In 1937, the members of the Council were: Rabbi Avraham Mordechai Alter, Rabbi Yitzchak Menachem Mendel Danziger of Aleksander, Rabbi Dovid Bornsztain of Sochatchov, Rabbi Avraham Yaakov Friedman of Sadigura, Rabbi Mordechai Shalom Yosef Friedman of Przemysl, Rabbi Elchonon Wasserman, Rabbi Aharon Levin, Rabbi Aharon Kotler, Rabbi Ben Zion Yoezer (Rabbi of Turda and President of the Federation of the Association of Ultra-Orthodox Communities in Romania), Rabbi Dov Ber Av Beit Din of Ozarkov, Rabbi Moshe Blum Av Beit Din of Zamosc, Rabbi Zalman Sorotzkin, Rabbi Yehuda Leib Tsirelson, Rabbi Yosef Tzvi Dushinsky, Rabbi Menachem Ziemba, Rabbi Mordechai Rotenberg, Rabbi of Antwerp, Rabbi Akiva Sofer, and Rabbi Shmuel Dovid Ungar. The council's president was Rabbi Chaim Ozer Grodzinski.

== Members – Israel ==
=== Past members ===
- Yehuda Ades, rosh yeshiva of Kol Yaakov [retired]
- Pinchas Menachem Alter, Rebbe of Ger (Chairman) [died 1996]
- Simcha Bunim Alter, Rebbe of Ger (Chairman) [died 1992]
- Yisrael Alter, Rebbe of Ger (Chairman) [died 1977]
- Shlomo Zalman Auerbach, Rosh Yeshiva of Kol Torah [died 1995]
- Gershon Edelstein, rosh yeshiva of the Ponevezh Yeshiva (Chairman) [died 2023]
- Yosef Shalom Eliashiv, prominent Posek (Co-Chairman) [died 2012]
- Baruch Mordechai Ezrachi, rosh yeshiva of Ateres Yisrael [died 2023]
- Aryeh Finkel, Rosh Yeshiva of Mir-Brachfeld [died 2016]
- Nosson Tzvi Finkel, Rosh Yeshiva of Mir [died 2011]
- Avraham Yaakov Friedman, 3rd Rebbe of Sadigura [died 1961]
- Avraham Yaakov Friedman, 5th Rebbe of Sadigura [died 2013]
- Yisroel Moshe Friedman, Rebbe of Sadigura [died 2020]
- Moshe Yehoshua Hager (Chairman 1980–2012) [died 2012]
- Levi Yitzchak Horowitz, Rebbe of Boston [died 2009]
- Chaim Kanievsky, (Chairman) [died 2022]
- Nissim Karelitz [died 2019]
- Michel Yehuda Lefkowitz [died 2011]
- Isser Zalman Meltzer (Chairman) [died 1953]
- Chaim Pinchas Scheinberg [died 2012]
- Yitzchok Scheiner, rosh yeshiva of the Yeshiva Kamenitz [died 2021]
- Boruch Shimon Schneerson [died 2001]
- Elazar Menachem Shach [died 2001]
- Yitzchak Isaac Sher [died 1952]
- Aharon Yehuda Leib Shteinman [died 2017]
- Yochanan Sofer, Rebbe of Erlau [died 2016]
- Zalman Sorotzkin (Chairman) [died 1966]
- Yisroel Don Taub [died 2006]
- Avrohom Yehoshua Heschel Twerski [died 1987]
- Dov Yaffe, of Kfar Chasidim [died 2017]
- Binyamin Zilber [died 2008]
- Baruch Weisbecker, rosh yeshiva of Beit Matityau Yeshiva in Bnei Brak [died 2024]
- Ben Zion Rabinovich, Rebbe of Biala (Hasidic dynasty) [died 2024]

=== Current members (Agudat Yisrael) ===
- Yaakov Aryeh Alter, Rebbe of Ger (Hasidic dynasty)
- Shmuel Barzovski, Rebbe of Slonim (Hasidic dynasty)
- Nachum Dov Brayer, Rebbe of Boyan (Hasidic dynasty)
- Eliezer Hager, Rebbe of Seret-Vizhnitz (Hasidic dynasty)
- Yisroel_Hager_(the_second), Rebbe of Vizhnitz (Hasidic dynasty)
- Menachem Mendel Hager, Rebbe of Vizhnitz-Merkaz (Hasidic dynasty)
- Zvi Elimelech Halberstam, Rebbe of Klausenburg (Hasidic dynasty)
- Mayer Alter Horowitz, Rebbe of Boston (Hasidic dynasty)
- Yissachar Dov Rokeach, Rebbe of Belz (Hasidic dynasty)
- Chaim Shaul Taub, Rebbe of Modzitz (Hasidic dynasty)

=== Current members (Degel HaTorah) ===
- Meir Tzvi Bergman, rosh yeshiva of the Yeshiva Rashbi
- Dov Lando, rosh yeshiva of Slabodka yeshiva
- Dovid Cohen, rosh yeshiva of Chevron Yeshiva
- Moshe Hillel Hirsch, rosh yeshiva of Slabodka yeshiva
- Berel Povarsky, rosh yeshiva of the Ponevezh Yeshiva
- Moshe Yehuda Shlesinger, rosh yeshiva of Kol Torah
- Yitzchak Zilberstein, Rav of Ramat Elchanan

==== New members (2020) ====
- Tzvi Drebkin, rosh yeshiva of the Grodno Yeshiva in Be'er Ya'akov
- Yitzchok Hecker, rosh yeshiva of the Grodno Yeshiva in Be'er Ya'akov
- Aviezer Piltz, rosh yeshiva of Tifrach
- Avrohom Yitzchok Hakohein Kook, rosh yeshiva of Yeshiva Maor Hatalmud in Rehovot
- Aryeh Levy, rosh yeshiva of Yeshiva S'char Sochir
- Shraga Shteinman, rosh yeshiva of Yeshiva Orchos Torah
- Eliezer Yehuda Finkel, rosh yeshiva of Yeshivas Mir Yerushalayim

== Members – United States ==
=== Past members ===
- Simcha Bunim Ehrenfeld
- Yitzchok Feigelstock
- Dovid Feinstein
- Moshe Feinstein (Chairman)
- Mordechai Shlomo Friedman of Boyan
- Mordechai Gifter
- Refael Reuvain Grozovsky
- Avrohom Yehoshua Heschel of Kapischnitz
- Shlomo Heiman (Chairman)
- Levi Yitzchak Horowitz
- Moshe Horowitz (Bostoner Rebbe of New York)
- Yitzchak Hutner
- Yaakov Kamenetsky
- Chaim Mordechai Katz
- Aharon Kotler (Chairman)
- Shneur Kotler
- Avrohom Chaim Levine
- Avraham Yaakov Pam
- Nochum Mordechai Perlow of Novominsk
- Yaakov Perlow (Chairman)
- Yaakov Yitzchok Ruderman
- Gedalia Schorr
- Eliezer Silver (Chairman)
- Joseph B. Soloveitchik
- Baruch Sorotzkin
- Yisroel Spira of Bluzhev
- Elya Svei
- Mendel Zaks
- Aaron Schechter

=== Current members ===
- Elya Brudny
- Hillel David
- Aharon Feldman
- Yosef Chaim Frankel (Vyelipol Rebbe)
- Aharon Dovid Goldberg
- Yaakov Horowitz (American Rabbi) (Rosh Yeshivas Beis Meir)
- Shmuel Kamenetsky
- Aryeh Malkiel Kotler
- Shlomo Eliyahu Miller
- Yerucham Olshin
- Yosef Harari Raful
- Yitzchok Sorotzkin
- Shimon Yehuda Svei

== See also ==
- Moetzet Chachmei HaTorah – a similar body of Shas
- Shura council (Islamic Movement) – a similar body of the Islamic Movement in Israel and historically Ra'am
