= Avrohom Yaakov Friedman (fifth Sadigura rebbe) =

Fifth Rebbe of the Sadigura Hasidic dynasty

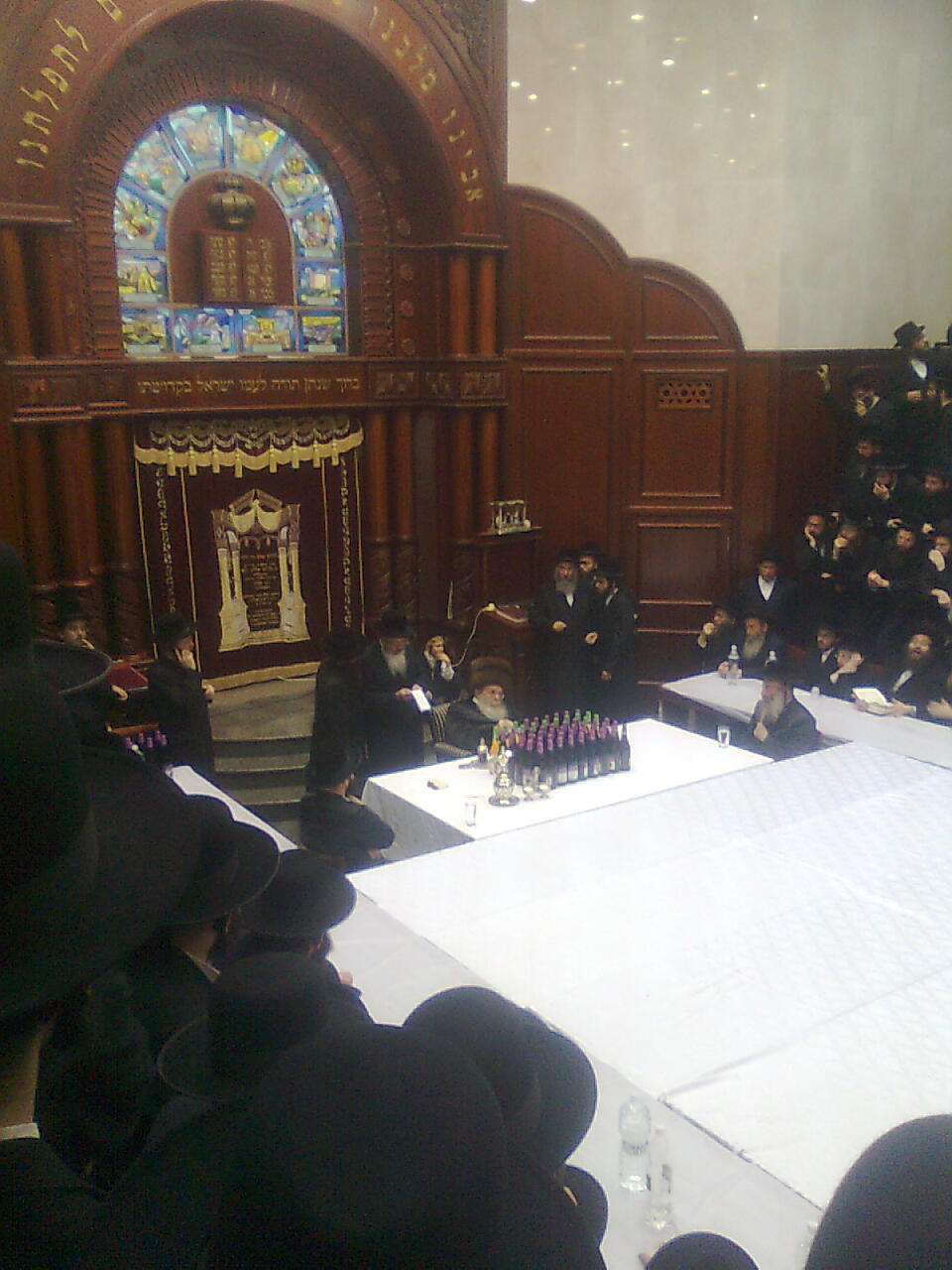
- Avrohom Yaakov Friedman conducts a tish in his beis medrash in Bnei Brak, 2012
- Title: Fifth Sadigura Rebbe

Personal life
- Born: Avrohom Yaakov Friedman; August 21, 1928 Vienna, Austria
- Died: January 1, 2013 (aged 84) Bnei Brak, Israel
- Buried: Tel Aviv, Israel
- Spouse: Tzipora Faige Feldman
- Children: Yisrael Moshe Friedman; Chava; Elisheva
- Parents: Mordechai Sholom Yosef Friedman (father); Mira Reisel (mother)
- Dynasty: Sadigura

Religious life
- Religion: Judaism

Jewish leader
- Predecessor: Mordechai Sholom Yosef Friedman
- Successor: Yisrael Moshe Friedman
- Began: 1979
- Ended: 2013
- Main work: Ikvei Abirim
- Dynasty: Sadigura

Avrohom Yaakov Friedman (August 21, 1928 – January 1, 2013) was the fifth Rebbe of the Sadigura Hasidic dynasty. In 1979 he succeeded his father, the fourth Sadigura Rebbe, and took his seat on the Moetzes Gedolei HaTorah. He oversaw the growth of Sadigura communities in Israel and in London, Antwerp, and New York City.

== Early life ==
Avrohom Yaakov Friedman was the son of Mordechai Sholom Yosef Friedman, the fourth Sadigura Rebbe, and his wife, Mira Reisel. On his father's side, he was the great-grandson of Yisrael Friedman, the second Sadigura Rebbe; the great-great-grandson of Rabbi Avrohom Yaakov Friedman, the first Sadigura Rebbe; and the great-great-great-grandson of Yisrael Friedman of Ruzhyn, the Ruzhiner Rebbe. On his mother's side, he was the grandson of Yisrael Shalom Yosef Heschel, the Medzhybizher Rav.

He was born in Vienna, the city to which his father had escaped during World War I together with his great-uncle, Avrohom Yaakov Friedman, the third Sadigura Rebbe. When he was 5 years old, he and his parents moved to Przemyśl, Poland, where his father opened a Hasidic court and a yeshiva. In the spring of 1939, his father traveled to Palestine to visit his Ruzhin relatives and was advised by his uncle, Yisrael Friedman, the Husiatyner Rebbe, who had emigrated there several years earlier, to remain. Later that summer, weeks before the outbreak of World War II, young Avrohom Yaakov and his mother joined him in Palestine.

== Education and marriage ==
From the time he was a young child, Avrohom Yaakov immersed himself in Torah learning. During his teens, he studied at Yeshivas HaYishuv Hechadash and Yeshivas Novarodok in Tel Aviv, and at Yeshivas Lomza in Petah Tikva. In each place, he was noted for using every spare minute to learn Torah. He was a close student of Yehoshua Menachem Ehrenberg, who gave him rabbinic ordination. He was also very close to his father, whom he considered his Rebbe. At age 18, his father instructed him to begin learning Kabbalah, and he eventually became conversant in Kabbalah texts.

In 1953 Friedman married Tzipora Faige Feldman, the daughter of Antiniya Hasidim who had emigrated from Romania when she was eight years old. Her father was one of the founders of Bais Yaakov in Israel. They had one son and two daughters.

In 1956 he followed his father to America, where his father opened a Przemyśl-Sadigura beis medrash in Crown Heights, Brooklyn. While he engaged in full-time Torah study, his wife operated a preschool while raising their family. In 1965, when his father returned to Israel to open a court in Tel Aviv, Friedman stayed on as Rav of the Brooklyn beis medrash. In 1973 Friedman and his wife returned to Israel, where he served as rosh yeshiva of the Ruzhiner yeshiva in Bnei Brak founded by his father.

== Accession to Rebbe ==
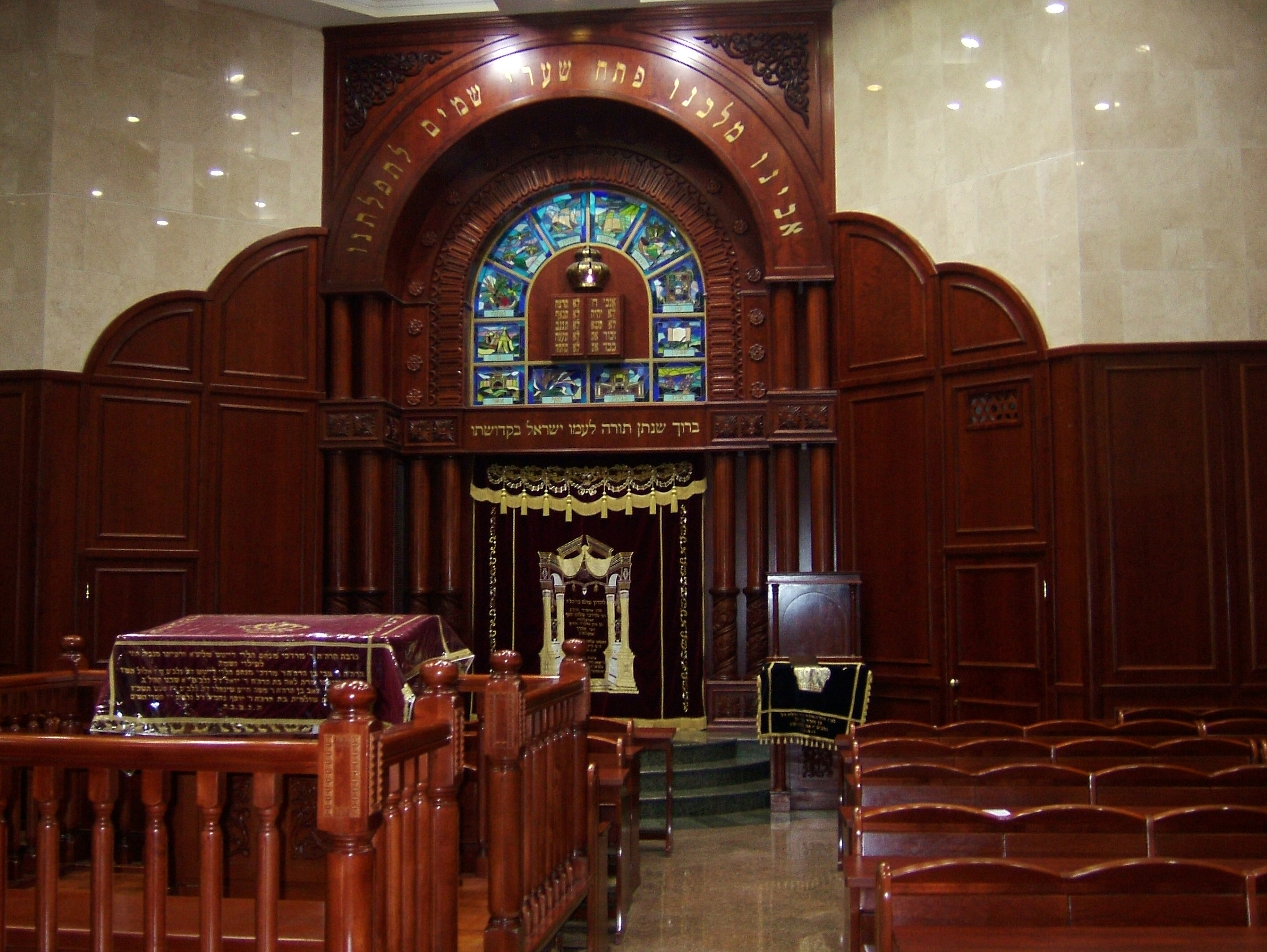
Sadigura beis medrash in Bnei Brak

Upon his father's death on 29 Nisan 1979, Friedman became the leader of the Sadigura Hasidim. He was also inducted into the Moetzes Gedolei HaTorah in his father's stead. He retained his father's court on Pinkus Street in Tel Aviv, and established an outreach center there for secular Jewish youth. In 2005 he relocated his court to a large edifice on Gutmacher Street in Bnei Brak.

He was known for his great love of fellow Jews and his open door to all petitioners. His prayers and blessings on behalf of others were said to be especially potent. He took an active interest in his children and grandchildren, answering their questions and learning Torah with them.

He oversaw the opening of Sadigura battei medrash in Jerusalem, Ashdod, Modiin Illit, Beitar Illit, and Elad, and the expansion of Sadigura communities to London, Antwerp, and New York City.

== Political views ==
The Rebbe took an active role in Israeli politics, supporting the Agudat Yisrael political party and urging his followers to vote for the United Torah Judaism list in the 2013 Israeli legislative election. He was the most right-wing member of the Moetzes Gedolei HaTorah, expressing his strong opposition to the Oslo Accords and Israel's unilateral disengagement plan and visiting Israeli settlements in the West Bank to bolster the Jews living there.

== Final years ==
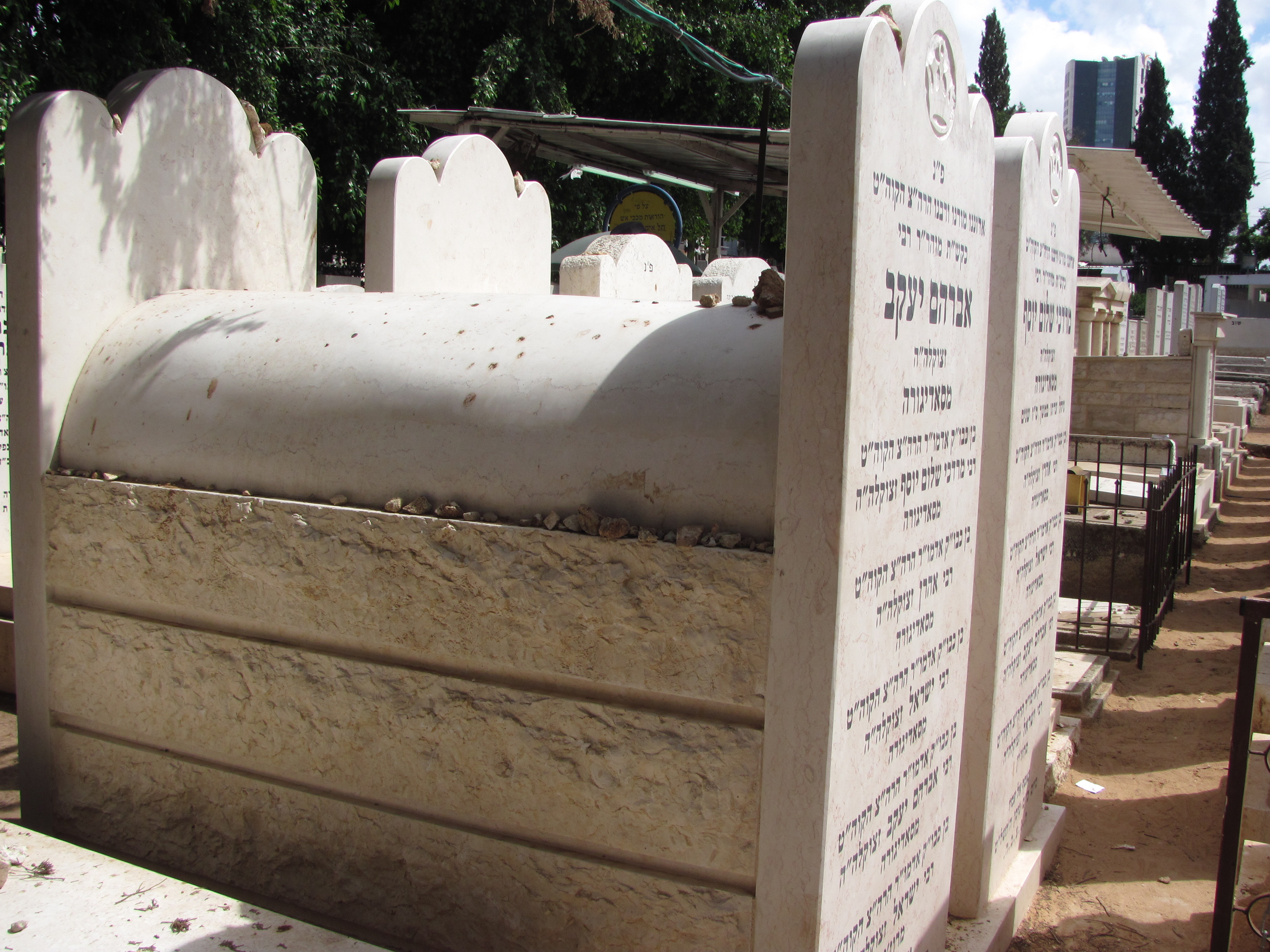
Graves of Rabbi Avrohom Yaakov Friedman (front) and his father, Rabbi Mordechai Sholom Yosef Friedman (rear), in the Nahalat Yitzhak Cemetery, Tel Aviv

In 1995 the Rebbe was diagnosed with Parkinson's disease. Nevertheless, he continued to conduct his private and public activities without any interruption.

At the end of December 2012 he came down with severe pneumonia, and was rushed to Ma'ayanei Hayeshuah Hospital in Bnei Brak on the morning of January 1, 2013 (19 Tevet 5773), where he died. His funeral, which set out from the Sadigura beis medrash in Bnei Brak in the early afternoon, was attended by the Rebbes of Boyan, Bohush, Kapishnitz, Vasloi, Ger, Vizhnitz, Toldos Abraham Yitzchak, and Sanz, as well as Litvishe gedolim. In keeping with tradition, no eulogies were said at this funeral of a Rebbe, but his will was read, naming his only son, Yisrael Moshe Friedman, av beis din of the Sadigura rabbinical court in London, as his successor. He was buried beside his father in the Ruzhiner section of the Nahalat Yitzhak Cemetery in Tel Aviv.

== Lineage of Sadigura dynastic leadership ==
- Yisrael Friedman of Ruzhyn, Ruzhiner Rebbe (1797–1850). Re-established his court in Sadigura in 1842.
  - Sholom Yosef Friedman (1813–1851), son of Yisrael Friedman of Ruzhyn. Rebbe from 1850 to 1851.
    - Avrohom Yaakov Friedman (1820–1883), son of Yisrael Friedman of Ruzhyn. Rebbe from 1851 to 1883.
      - Yisrael Friedman of Sadigura (1852–1907), son of Avrohom Yaakov Friedman of Sadigura. Rebbe from 1883 to 1907.
        - Aharon of Sadigura (1877–1913), son of Yisrael Friedman of Sadigura. Rebbe from 1907 to 1913.
          - Avrohom Yaakov Friedman (1884–1961), son of Yisrael Friedman of Sadigura. Rebbe from 1907 to 1961.
            - Mordechai Sholom Yosef Friedman (1897–1979), son of Aharon of Sadigura. Rebbe from 1961 to 1979.
              - Avrohom Yaakov Friedman (1928–2013), son of Mordechai Sholom Yosef of Sadigura. Rebbe from 1979 to 2013.
                - Yisrael Moshe Friedman (1955-2020), son of Avrohom Yaakov of Sadigura. Rebbe from 2013 to 2020.
                  - Yitzchok Yehoshua Heshel Friedman (1996–present), son of Yisroel Moshe of Sadigura. Rebbe since August 2020.
