= Yisroel Moshe Friedman =

American-Israeli religious leader

Rabbi Yisroel Moshe Friedman רב ישראל משה פרידמאן
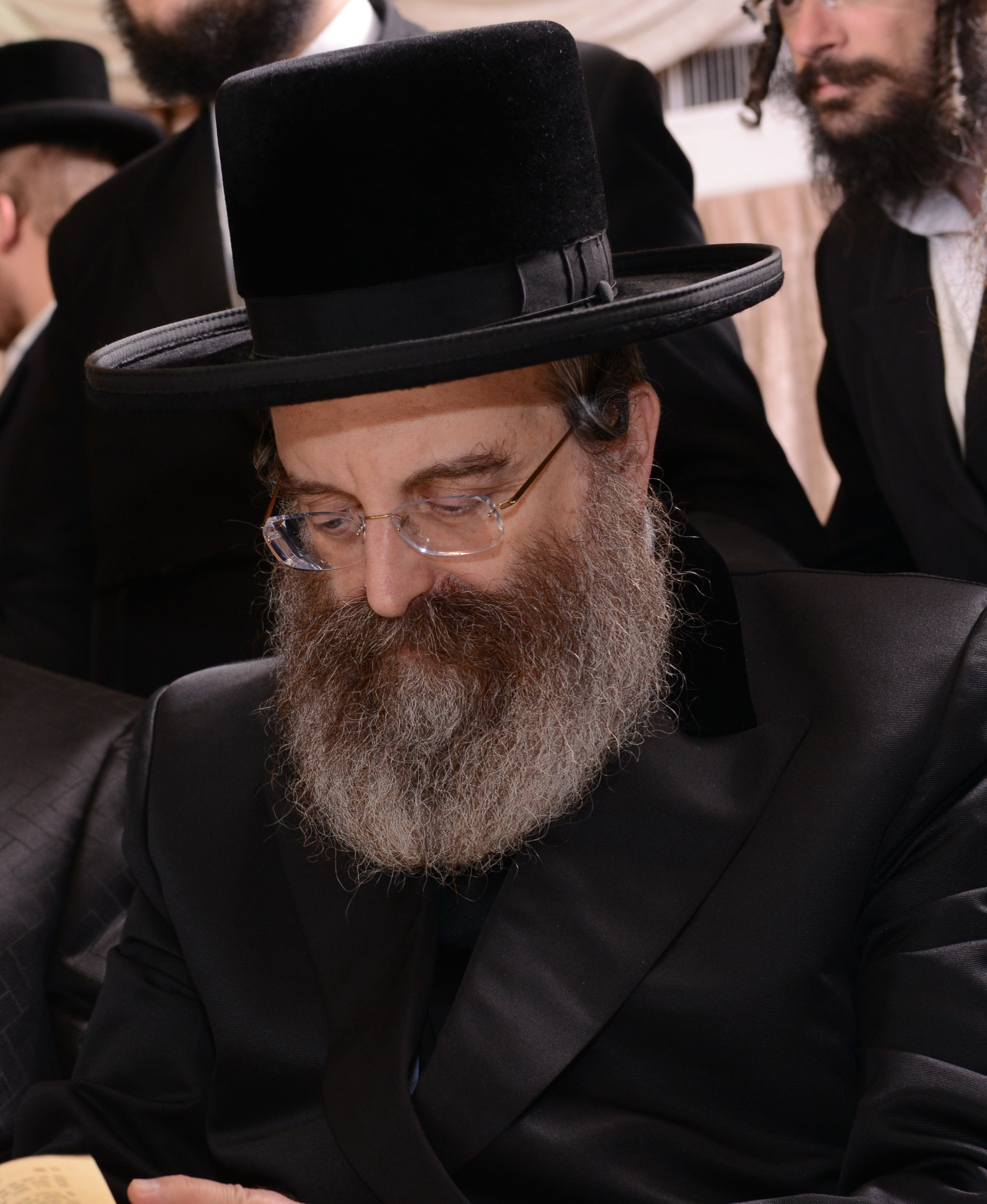

Personal life
- Born: July 23, 1955 Brooklyn, New York
- Died: August 10, 2020 (aged 65) Ramat Gan, Israel
- Buried: Nachlat Yitzchak Cemetery, Givatayim, Israel
- Spouse: Sarah Friedman (née Feldman)
- Parents: Rabbi Avraham Yaakov Friedman (father); Tziporah Feiga Friedman (mother)
- Dynasty: Sadigura

Religious life
- Religion: Judaism
- Denomination: Hasidic Judaism
- Yahrtzeit: כ"א אב תש"פ
- Dynasty: Sadigura
- Semikhah: Rabbi Moshe Feinstein; Rabbi Chanoch Henoch Padwa; Rabbi Yitzchak Yaakov Weiss; Rabbi Shmuel Wosner

Yisroel Moshe Friedman (Hebrew: ישראל משה פרידמאן; July 23, 1955 – August 10, 2020) was the sixth Rebbe of the Sadigura Hasidic dynasty. He led his court from Bnei Brak, Israel.

== Early years ==
Yisroel Moshe Friedman was born on July 23, 1955, in Brooklyn, New York to Rabbi Avraham Yaakov (the Ikvei Abirim) and Rebbitzen Tziporah Feiga Friedman. He was named for Rabbi Yisrael Friedman, the founder of the Ruzhiner dynasty, and Rabbi Moshe Friedman of Boyan-Cracow. At that time, his paternal grandfather, Rabbi Mordechai Sholom Yosef Friedman (the Knesses Mordechai), served as Sadigura Rebbe. He attended Yeshivas Ruzhin for yeshiva ketana and then the Ponevezh Yeshiva, where he became one of the top students.

=== London ===
In 1979, Friedman married Sara Feldman of London, and settled in the city's Stamford Hill neighborhood. Three months after his wedding, his grandfather died and his father became Rebbe. In 1993, on the yahrtzeit of the first Ruzhiner Rebbe, he opened the Ohr Yisrael shul in Golders Green, London, and developed close relationships with the community members. He also served as a dayan (Rabbinic judge) in London.

=== Proficiency in Torah ===
Friedman was known to be proficient in Torah, not just in Chassidic works, but in all areas. His broad knowledge of Shas and poskim was well known. He received semicha (Rabbinic ordination) from some of the leaders of Orthodox Jewry: Rabbis Moshe Feinstein, Chanoch Henoch Padwa, Yitzchak Yaakov Weiss (the Minchas Yitzchak), and Shmuel Wosner.

== Rebbe ==
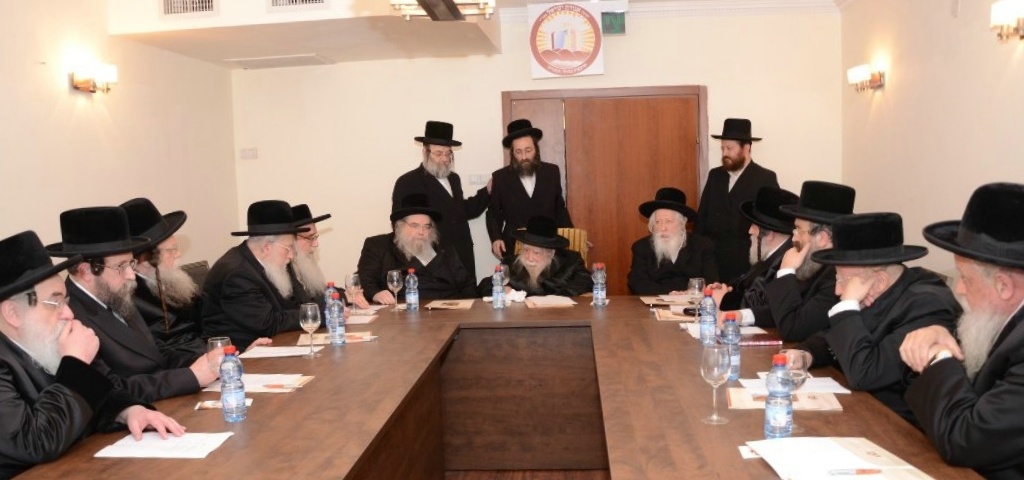
Rabbi Friedman (third from right) at a meeting of the Moetzes Agudas Yisrael in 2013

After the death of his father on January 1, 2013, Friedman left London for Israel where he was appointed as sixth Rebbe of the Sadigura Hasidim, and settled in Bnei Brak, where the Sadigura court is headquartered. As Rebbe, one of his big focuses was making anyone welcome in the chassidus; that nobody would feel left out. He became known as one of the great rabbis in Israel, and was part of the Moetzes Gedolei HaTorah.

Around 2018, Friedman fell ill due to pancreatic cancer, and spent much of 2019 in Los Angeles, undergoing treatments. However, even from America, he led his court, ensuring his chassidim had what they needed. In the summer of 2020, he returned to Bnei Brak on a private flight, (as COVID-19 had halted all air travel); he wanted to be with his community for the Yamim Noraim. On August 10, 2020, Friedman collapsed and was rushed to Sheba-Tel Hashomer Hospital, where he died later in the day.

== Lineage of Sadigura dynastic leadership ==
- Yisrael Friedman of Ruzhyn, Ruzhiner Rebbe (1797–1850). Re-established his court in Sadigura in 1842.
  - Sholom Yosef Friedman (1813–1851), son of Yisrael Friedman of Ruzhyn. Rebbe from 1850 to 1851.
    - Avrohom Yaakov Friedman (1820–1883), son of Yisrael Friedman of Ruzhyn. Rebbe from 1851 to 1883.
      - Yisrael Friedman of Sadigura (1852–1907), son of Avrohom Yaakov Friedman of Sadigura. Rebbe from 1883 to 1907.
        - Aharon of Sadigura (1877–1913), son of Yisrael Friedman of Sadigura. Rebbe from 1907 to 1913.
          - Avrohom Yaakov Friedman (1884–1961), son of Yisrael Friedman of Sadigura. Rebbe from 1907 to 1961.
            - Mordechai Sholom Yosef Friedman (1897–1979), son of Aharon of Sadigura. Rebbe from 1961 to 1979.
              - Avrohom Yaakov Friedman (1928–2013), son of Mordechai Sholom Yosef. Rebbe from 1979 to 2013.
                - Yisrael Moshe Friedman (1955-2020), son of Avrohom Yaakov of Sadigura. Rebbe from 2013 to 2020.
                  - Mordechai Sholom Yosef Friedman of Jerusalem son of Yisrael Moshe of Sadigura. (2020). Current Rebbe of Sadigura in Jerusalem.
                  - Aharon Dov Ber Friedman of London son of Yisrael Moshe of Sadigura. (2020). Current Rebbe of Sadigura in London.
                  - Yitzchok Yehoshua Heshel Friedman of Bnei Brak son of Yisrael Moshe of Sadigura. (2020). Current Rebbe of Sadigura in Bnei Brak.

Jewish titles
Preceded by Rabbi Avrohom Yaakov Friedman	Sadigura Rebbe; 2013–2020

== See also ==
- Sadigura (Hasidic dynasty)
- Ruzhin (Hasidic dynasty)
