= Sadigura (Hasidic dynasty) =

Hasidic dynasty

Sadigura Hasidic Dynasty
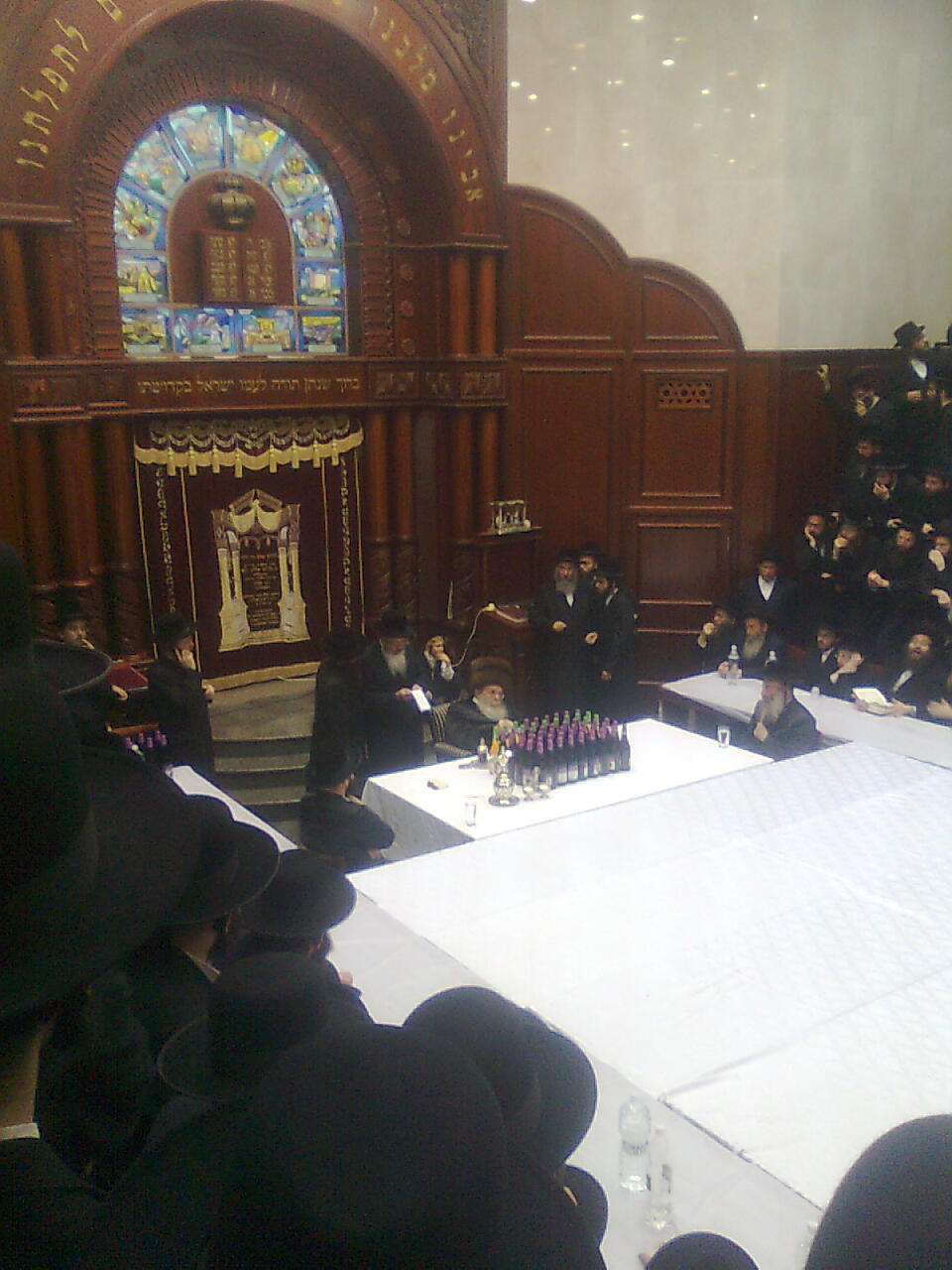
- The fifth rebbe, Avrohom Yaakov Friedman, hosting followers in 2010

Founder
- Rabbi Avrohom Yaakov Friedman

Regions with significant populations
- Israel, United States, Europe

Religions
- Hasidic Judaism

Related ethnic groups
- Ruzhin (Hasidic dynasty), Bohush, Boyan, Chortkov, Husiatyn, Shtefanesht

Sadigura is a Hasidic dynasty named for the city of Sadhora (Sadigura in Yiddish), Bukovina, which was part of the Austrian Empire. The dynasty began in 1850 with Rabbi Avrohom Yaakov Friedman, a son of Rabbi Yisrael Friedman of Ruzhyn, and was based in Sadigura until 1914. During the interwar period the dynasty was led by rebbes (ruling hereditary dynastic rabbis) in Vienna and Przemyśl, Poland, and just before World War II moved to Israel.

Sadigura is one of the branches of the Ruzhiner dynasty, together with Bohush, Boyan, Chortkov, Husiatyn, and Shtefanesht.

As of 2013, Sadigura had several hundred members in Israel, the United States and Europe. Its members reside in Israel (Jerusalem, Ashdod, Modiin Ilit, Beitar Ilit, and Elad), in North America, (Los Angeles and New York City), and in Europe (London and Antwerp).

The 6th rebbe, Yisrael Moshe Friedman died in Bnei Brak on 11 August 2020 aged 64. He was succeeded by his three sons, Mordechai Sholom Yosef, Aaron Dov Ber and Avrohom Yehosua Heshel.

== History ==
=== Leadership in Austria ===
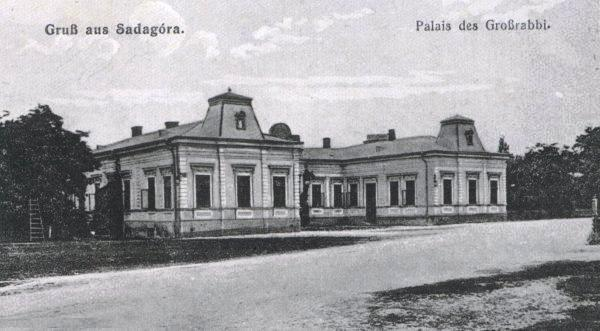
Palatial home of the Sadigura Rebbe in Sadhora.

In the early 1840s, the Ruzhiner Rebbe fled Russia to escape persecution by the Tsar. He moved his family to Sadigura. where he lived for ten years and built a palatial residence and an imposing synagogue, and attracted tens of thousands of Hasidim. When the Ruzhiner Rebbe died at the age of 54 on 9 October 1850, his six sons established their own courts in different towns. His eldest son, Rabbi Sholom Yosef Friedman (1813-1851), remained in Sadigura to continue leading the court his father had founded, but died ten months later. At this point, the Ruzhiner Rebbe's second son, Rabbi Avrohom Yaakov (1820–1883), assumed the mantle of leadership in Sadigura, becoming known as the first Sadigura Rebbe.

The Sadigura Rebbe maintained the grand lifestyle of his father's court, with its lavish accoutrements and showy dress, and immersed himself in the mysticism of Kabbalah, as had his father. The combination of earthly royalty and spiritual depth attracted both Jews and Christians to his court. Hundreds of thousands of Jews sought his wisdom and counsel. He also entertained visits from prominent Christians, including princes, counts, and writers who published articles about him in newspapers in Vienna, Berlin, Frankfurt, Prague, and other locales.

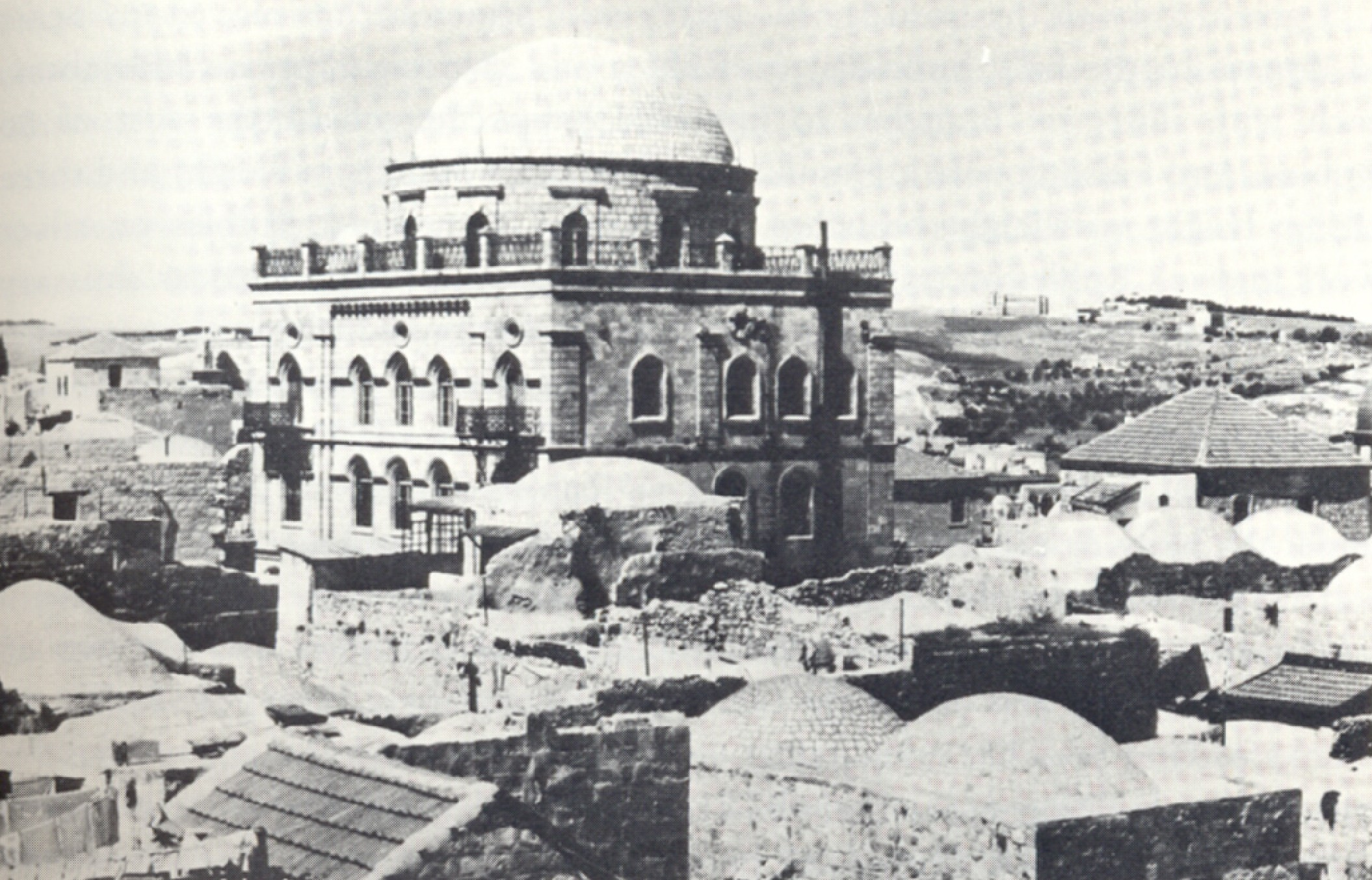
The Tiferet Yisrael Synagogue in Jerusalem, named after Rabbi Yisrael Friedman of Ruzhyn and used by all branches of the Ruzhiner dynasty.

The Sadigura Rebbe undertook the remainder of the fund-raising for the Tiferet Yisrael Synagogue, the Ruzhiner synagogue in the Old City of Jerusalem initiated by his father. The synagogue was completed in 1872. He also purchased the privilege of lighting the main bonfire at the grave of Rabbi Shimon bar Yochai in Meron, Israel on Lag BaOmer from the Sephardi guardians of Meron and Safed. The Sadigura Rebbe bequeathed this honor to his eldest son, Rabbi Yitzchok, the first Boyaner Rebbe, and his progeny.

After his death, his two sons, Rabbi Yitzchok (1850–1917) and Rabbi Yisrael (1852–1907), assumed joint leadership of their father's Hasidim. While they were content with this arrangement, many of the Sadigura Hasidim preferred to have one Rebbe, and in 1887, the brothers agreed to draw lots to determine who would stay in Sadigura and who would move out. The lots fell to Rabbi Yisrael to remain as the second Sadigura Rebbe, while Rabbi Yitzchok moved to the neighboring town of Boiany (Boyan) and established his court there, becoming the first Boyaner Rebbe.

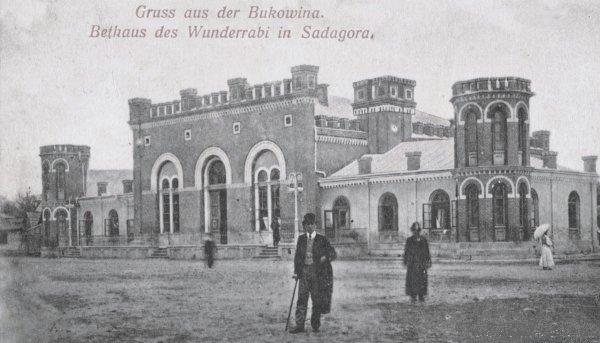
The Sadigura synagogue in Sadhora.

Rabbi Yisrael had five sons: Rabbi Aharon of Sadigura (the author of Kedushas Aharon) (1877–1913) who had considerable musical accomplishment, Rabbi Shlomo Yosef of Chernovitz, Rabbi Avrohom Yaakov Friedman of Sadigura (1884–1961), Rabbi Yitzhak of Rimanov (1887–1929), and Rabbi Shlomo Chaim (Reb Shlomenu) of Sadigura (1887–1972). After Rabbi Yisrael's death in 1907, each of his sons became Rebbes, making their courts and conducting their tishen in different halls of the great Sadigura synagogue. Rabbi Yisrael's eldest son, the Kedushas Aharon, died in 1912 and was succeeded by his 16-year-old son, Rabbi Mordechai Sholom Yosef Friedman.

In 1914, with the outbreak of World War I, Rabbi Avrohom Yaakov fled to Vienna together with his younger brother, Rabbi Shlomo Chaim, and his orphaned nephew, Rabbi Mordechai Sholom Yosef. Rabbi Avrohom Yaakov established his court in Vienna and led the Sadigura Hasidim from that city for the next 24 years. The relocation of the Sadigura Rebbes to Vienna spelled the end of the once flourishing Jewish community in Sadigura, which comprised more than 5,000 Jews before World War I. Although some Jews remained, only a few lone survivors were left at the end of World War II .

=== Leadership in Israel ===
Rabbi Avrohom Yaakov Friedman, grandson of the first Sadigura rebbe, obtained a visa to Palestine shortly after the Anschluss of 1938 and re-established his court in Tel Aviv. Thousands of Sadigura Hasidim were murdered in the Holocaust, leaving the Rebbe with only a few dozen followers. Nonetheless, he continued to lead his Hasidim with princely bearing, conducting his court in Tel Aviv for 22 years until his death in 1961. Known as the third Sadigura Rebbe, Rabbi Avrohom Yaakov was actively involved in Jewish communal life in the new state of Israel, being one of the first members of Agudat Israel and occupying a seat on the Moetzes Gedolei HaTorah.

After the death of the third Sadigura Rebbe in 1961, his Hasidim asked his younger brother, Rabbi Shlomo Chaim, to succeed him, but the latter demurred. He did agree to sit in his brother's place at tischen held on Jewish holidays and on the yahrtzeits of his Ruzhiner and Sadigura ancestors. Meanwhile, the Sadigura dynasty continued through the Rebbe's nephew, Rabbi Mordechai Sholom Yosef Friedman (1897–1979), known as the fourth Admor of Sadigura, who led Sadigura Hasidim in Sadigura and Przemyśl (where he founded the Yeshiva 'Meshivas Nefesh') before emigrating to Tel Aviv in 1939. His words of Torah were compiled in Knesses Mordechai. Upon his death in 1979, Rabbi Mordechai Sholom Yosef was interred near the other Admorim of Sadigur, in the 'Nachlas Yitzchak' cemetery in Givatayim, and was succeeded by his son, Rabbi Avrohom Yaakov Friedman (1928–2013), who moved the Sadigura court from Tel Aviv to Bnei Brak. Rabbi Avrohom Yaakov died at the age of 84 on 1 January 2013, after being ill from pneumonia, and was buried in the Nahalat Yitzhak cemetery alongside his father. He was succeeded by his only son, the previous Sadigura Rebbe, Rabbi Yisrael Moshe Friedman (b. 1955), former Rov & founder of Kehilas Sadigura in London.

Rabbi Yisrael Moshe Friedman died at the age of 65 in Bnei Brak on 11 August 2020, following a lengthy illness and was buried in the Nahalat Yitzhak cemetery in Givatayim, alongside his father and grandfather. He was succeeded by his son Rabbi Yitzchok Yehoshua Heshel in Bnei Brak.

== Lineage of the Sadigura dynasty ==
=== Rabbi Avrohom Yaakov I ===
Rabbi Avrohom Yaakov was the second son of Rabbi Yisroel of Ruzhyn, and the first man to carry the title "Sadigura Rebbe". He was considered the biggest Rebbe of his generation, along with his second youngest brother, Rabbi Dovid Moshe of Chortkov. He is known to followers as The Alter Rebbe, not to be confused with Rabbi Shneur Zalman of Liadi, Alter Rebbe of Chabad-Lubavitch. His teachings are recorded in many volumes, primarily the two part sefer Emes L'Yaakov, not to be confused with the sefer by Reb Yaakov Emden with the same title.

=== Rabbi Yisroel of Sadigura ===
The second Rebbe of Sadigura was Rabbi Yisroel Friedman, the third son of Rabbi Avrohom Yaakov. He should not be confused with his first cousin, Rabbi Yisroel Friedman of Chortkov, with whom he had a close personal friendship. After serving as Rebbe alongside his elder brother Reb Yitzchok for approximately one year following his father's death, Rav Yitzchok moved to Boyan leaving the mantle of Sadigura solely to Rav Yisroel's descendants. His teachings are recorded primarily in Ohr Yisroel, and he is known to his chassidim by this name.

=== Rabbi Aharon ===
Rabbi Aharon Friedman was the oldest son of Rabbi Yisroel of Sadigura, and the last Sadigura Rebbe to serve his entire tenure in Sadhora. He is known for musical talents and for the deep kabbalistic style of his Torah. He was named for his forefather, Rabbi Aharon of Karlin. There are many similarities between the two Rabbis, including their identical lifespan of exactly 36 years and six months each. Chassidim refer to him as the Kedushas Aharon, after the sefer that records his teachings.

=== Rabbi Avrohom Yaakov II ===
Rabbi Avrohom Yaakov II was the younger brother of Rabbi Aharon, and the fifth son of Rabbi Yisoel. He served as an alternate Rebbe in Sadigura during the life of his eldest brother, and in Vienna and Tel Aviv during the tenure of his nephew. He is called the Abir Yaakov by Chassidim, and his title is "Rebbe of Sadigura-Tel Aviv".

=== Rabbi Mordechai Shalom Yosef ===
Rabbi Mordechai Shalom Yosef of Sadigura-Pshemisyl was the only child of Rav Aharon, and the youngest to serve as Sadigura Rebbe. He was sixteen years old when he assumed leadership of the dynasty. He began his tenure in Sadhora, and then moved to Pshemishyl where he established a shul and yeshiva. He then moved to Vienna where his uncles lived. He relocated to the Crown Heights neighborhood of Brooklyn, where he led his rabbinical court until he migrated to Tel Aviv. He built his Beis Medrash there, and established the Sadigura Institutions in nearby Bnei Brak. He was a leading Rabbi in the Agudah, serving the organization until the end of his life. He was the longest serving Sadigura Rebbe, having led the dynasty for more than 66 years. Chassidim call him the Knesses Mordechai, after his sefer.

=== Rabbi Avrohom Yaakov III ===
Rabbi Avrohom Yaakov III was the second son of Rav Mordechai Shalom Yosef, and the fifth Rebbe of Sadigura. Prior to his father's death, he served as Rosh Yeshiva in the Sadigura Yeshiva established by his father. He was also a senior member of the Moetzes Gedolei HaTorah of Agudas Yisroel. He relocated the chassidus's headquarters to B'nei Brak after serving in Tel Aviv for approximately two decades. Chassidim call him Der Rebbe Der Ikvei Abirim.

=== Rabbi Yisroel Moshe ===
Rabbi Yisroel Moshe, known as "Der Sadigura Rebbe Zatzal" was the third child and only son of Rabbi Avrohom Yaakov III. He established the Kehilla of Sadigura-London, which he led personally until his coronation as rebbe upon his father's death. He assumed his father's positions in Sadigura and on the Moetzes Gedolei HaTorah, which he held for seven and a half years until his early passing in 2020 at age 65. It was during his tenure as Rebbe that the Ruzhyner's Hoif in Sadhora was rededicated. His teachings are recorded in Ateres Yisroel, Abirei Yam, and Yalkut Imrei Kodesh-Sadigura.

Three of his sons have taken over leadership. Rabbi Mordechai Sholom Yosef Friedman leads the court in Jerusalem. Rabbi Aaron Dov Ber Friedman leads the court in London. Rabbi Yitzchok Yehoshua Heshel Friedman, second to youngest son of the previous Rebbe, has taken over the court in Bnei Brak.

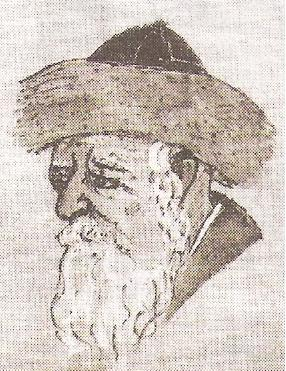
Dov Ber of Mezeritch (1710–1772); The Maggid of Mezeritch (disciple of the Baal Shem Tov)
Avrohom the Angel; Reb Avrohom HaMalach
Sholom Shachne of Prhobisht; Reb Sholom of Prhobisht
Yisroel Friedman (1797–1851); Rebbe of Ruzhin
Avrohom Yaakov Friedman (1820–1883); 1st Rebbe of Sadigura
Yisroel Friedman (1853–1907); 2nd Rebbe of Sadigura
Sholom Yosef of Chernovitz	Avrohom Yaakov Friedman (1884-1961); Avir Yaakov; 3rd Rebbe of Sadigura	Yitzchok Friedman of Rimanov	Aaron Friedman (1877–1913); Kedushas Aharon; Rebbe of Sadigura	Shlomo Chaim ("Shlomenyu") Friedman (1887–1972); Rebbe of Sadigura
Mordechai Sholom Yosef Friedman (1897–1979); Knesses Mordechai; 4th Rebbe of Sadigura
Avrohom Yaakov Friedman (1928–2013); 5th Rebbe of Sadigura
Yisrael Moshe Friedman (1955–2020); 6th Rebbe of Sadigura

== Image gallery ==
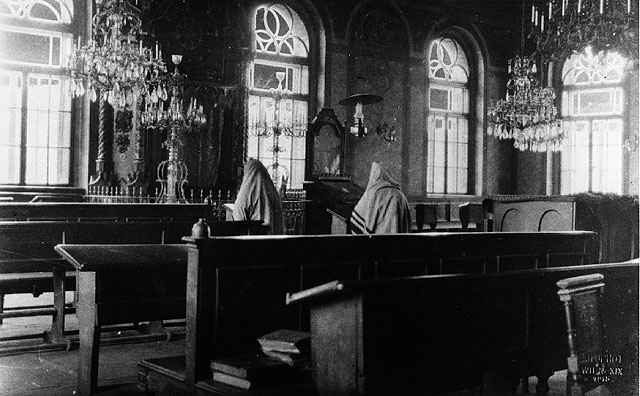
Interior of the hasidic synagogue in Sadhora

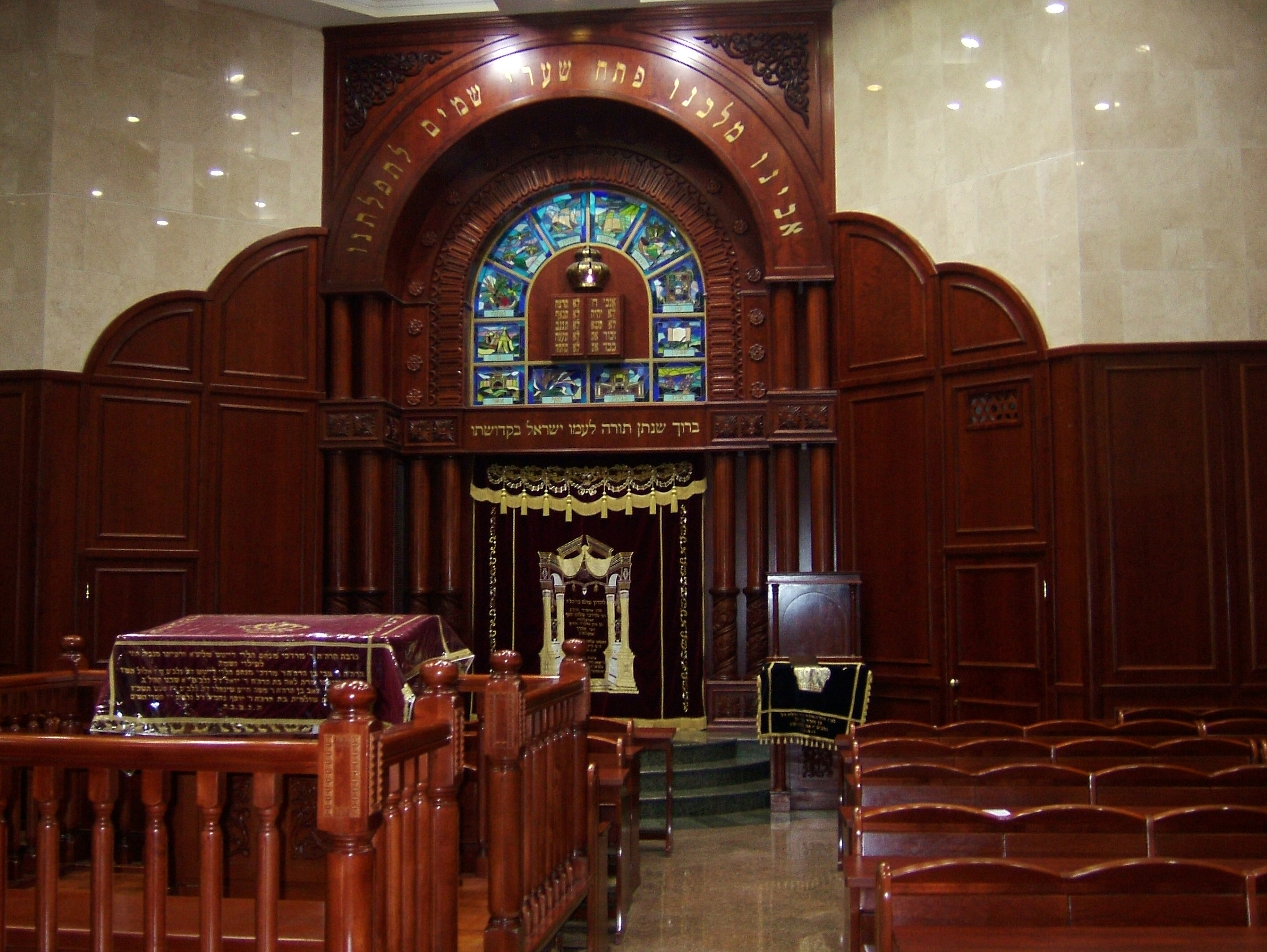
Interior of the new Sadigura Beis HaMedrash in Bnei Brak

== See also ==
- History of the Jews in Poland
- History of the Jews in Galicia (Central Europe)
- History of the Jews in Ukraine
