= Avrohom Yaakov Friedman (first Sadigura rebbe) =

Ukrainian rabbi (1820–1883)

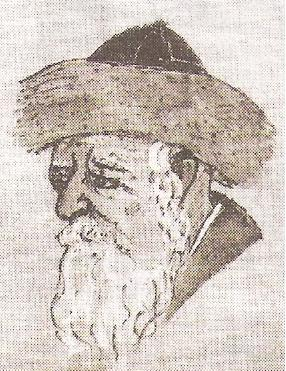
- Title: First Sadigura Rebbe

Personal life
- Born: Avrohom Yaakov Friedman; 28 October 1820 Ruzhyn, Russian Empire (now Ukraine)
- Died: 12 September 1883 (aged 62) Sadigura, Duchy of Bukovina, Austro-Hungarian Empire (now Chernivtsi Oblast, Ukraine)
- Buried: Sadigura
- Spouse: Miriam
- Children: Yitzchok Friedman; Yisrael Friedman of Sadigura
- Parents: Yisrael Friedman of Ruzhyn (father); Sarah (mother)
- Dynasty: Sadigura

Religious life
- Religion: Judaism

Jewish leader
- Successor: Yisrael Friedman of Sadigura
- Began: 1851
- Ended: 1883
- Main work: Emes LeYaakov
- Dynasty: Sadigura

Avrohom Yaakov Friedman (28 October 1820 – 12 September 1883) was the first Rebbe of the Sadigura Hasidic dynasty. He lived in the palatial home constructed by his father, Rabbi Yisrael Friedman of Ruzhyn, who fled to the Austrian town of Sadhora (Sadigura in Yiddish) due to persecution by the Russian Tsar. He maintained his father's extravagant lifestyle while immersing himself in Torah study and mysticism. He was considered the greatest Rebbe of his era, attracting hundreds of thousands of Jews as well as prominent Christian leaders to his court.

== Early life ==
Avrohom Yaakov Friedman was born in Ruzhyn, then part of the Russian Empire, in what is now Ukraine to Rabbi Yisrael Friedman of Ruzhyn (1797–1851), founder of the Ruzhiner dynasty, and his wife, Sarah. He was the second of six sons and had four sisters. He married Miriam, the daughter of Rabbi Aharon of Karlin.

== As Rebbe ==
In 1840 the Ruzhiner Rebbe was forced to flee Russia due to persecution by the Tsar. He moved his family to the town of Sadigura, Bukovina, in Austria (Carpathian Mountains). The Ruzhiner Rebbe lived in Sadigura for ten years, building a palatial home and a large synagogue and attracting tens of thousands of Hasidim. When the Ruzhiner Rebbe died at the age of 54 on 9 October 1850, each of his sons moved to different towns to establish their own courts. His eldest son, Rabbi Sholom Yosef Friedman (1813–1851), remained in Sadigura to continue leading the court his father had founded, but died ten months later. At this point, the Ruzhiner Rebbe's second son, Rabbi Avrohom Yaakov, assumed the mantle of leadership, becoming known as the first Sadigura Rebbe.

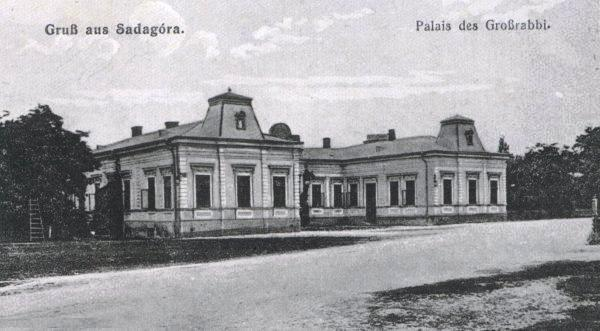
Palatial home of the Sadigura Rebbe in Sadigura.

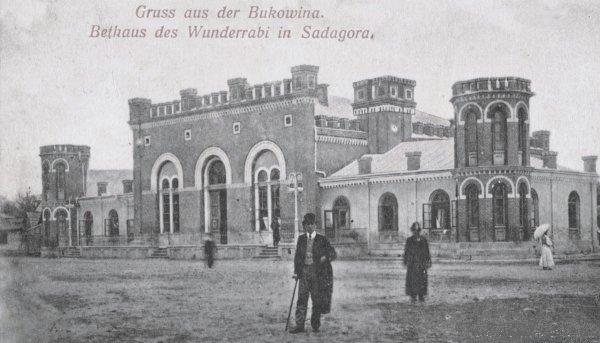
The Rebbe's synagogue in Sadigura.

The Sadigura Rebbe maintained the extravagant lifestyle of his father's court, with its lavish accoutrements and showy dress, and also immersed himself in the mysticism of Kabbalah, as did his father. This combination of earthly royalty and spiritual depth attracted both Jews and Christians to his court. Hundreds of thousands of Jews sought his wisdom and counsel. He was admired and visited by many of the great Torah scholars and rebbes of his generation, including Rabbi Yitzchok of Vurka, Rabbi Yitzchak Meir Alter (the first Gerrer Rebbe), the sons of Rabbi Mordechai Twersky of Chernobyl, and the disciples of the Chozeh of Lublin and the Sar Shalom of Belz. The Rebbe also entertained visits from prominent Christians, including princes, counts, and writers who published articles about him in newspapers in Vienna, Berlin, Frankfurt, Prague, and other cities. In the 1870s he received a visit from Laurence Oliphant, who wanted to establish a fund to buy Palestine from the Ottoman Empire for the purpose of Jewish colonization. Oliphant believed that the Rebbe was the "leader of world Jewry" and could help him. The Rebbe demurred, saying that he was a Turkish citizen living on a Turkish passport.

Theodor Herzl, the visionary of a Jewish state, visited the Rebbe in Sadigura and suggested that the "Wonder Rebbe" move to Palestine to serve as its spiritual leader. In his diary entry of June 16, 1896, Herzl described his vision of the Jewish state as "a destination for the civilized world which will come to visit as it now visits...Sadigura". The Rebbe rejected Herzl and his ideas.

The Sadigura Rebbe was widely known and respected for his wisdom, intellect, and witty speech. Presiding as he did over a court filled with beauty and splendor, giving inspiration to the downtrodden Jews of Galicia, Romania and Ukraine, the Rebbe aroused the envy of the local maskilim, who sought to topple him as they had done his father. In 1856, the maskilim defamed him to the authorities, claiming he was in partnership with a Jewish forger taken into custody by police. The forger was in possession of a letter from the Rebbe blessing him in all his endeavors. The Rebbe was incarcerated for 15 months in a damp, cold cell with scanty food, seriously damaging his health. Upon his release, his brothers and Hasidim staged massive prayer sessions for him. One young Hasid, Mordechai Mishel of Linsk, offered to take on the Rebbe's illness in return for a share in the World to Come. The Hasid fell ill that evening and died shortly after, while the Rebbe's health improved and he lived for many more years.

The Sadigura Rebbe encouraged and abetted Jews to settle in the Holy Land. He chaired the Kolel Vohlin and completed the fund-raising for the Tiferet Yisrael Synagogue, the Ruzhiner synagogue in the Old City of Jerusalem initiated by and named after his father. The synagogue was completed in 1872. He also purchased the privilege of lighting the main bonfire at the grave of Rabbi Shimon bar Yochai in Meron, Israel on Lag BaOmer from the Sephardi guardians of Meron and Safed. The Sadigura Rebbe bequeathed this honor to his surviving eldest son, Rabbi Yitzchok Friedman, the first Boyaner Rebbe, and his progeny.

== Final years and legacy ==
In 1881 the Sadigura Rebbe lost his eldest son, Rabbi Shlomo Friedman (1843–1881) and, two years later, his son-in-law, Rabbi Nochum Ber (1843–1883), both promising young men. Long accustomed to eating a minimal diet, the Rebbe stopped eating altogether and died on September 12, 1883 (11 Elul 5643). His yahrtzeit coincided with that of his elder brother, Rabbi Sholom Yosef, who died on 11 Elul thirty-two years earlier. He was buried in the same plot as his father, the Ruzhiner Rebbe, and his brother, Rabbi Dov Ber of Lieov (1822–1876), in Sadigura.

After his death, his two sons, Rabbi Yitzchok (1850–1917) and Rabbi Yisrael (1852–1907), assumed joint leadership of their father's Hasidim. Although they were content with this arrangement, many of the Sadigura Hasidim preferred to have one Rebbe, and in 1887, the brothers agreed to draw lots to determine who would stay in Sadigura and who would move out. The lots fell to Rabbi Yisrael to remain as the second Sadigura Rebbe, while Rabbi Yitzchok moved to the neighboring town of Boiany (Boyan) and established his court there, becoming the first Boyaner Rebbe.

== Lineage of Sadigura dynastic leadership ==
- Yisrael Friedman of Ruzhyn, Ruzhiner Rebbe (1797–1850). Re-established his court in Sadigura in 1840.
  - Sholom Yosef Friedman (1813–1851), son of Yisrael Friedman of Ruzhyn. Rebbe from 1850 to 1851.
    - Avrohom Yaakov Friedman (1820–1883), son of Yisrael Friedman of Ruzhyn. First Sadigura rebbe, from 1851 to 1883.
      - Yisrael Friedman of Sadigura (1852–1907), son of Avrohom Yaakov Friedman. Rebbe from 1883 to 1907.
        - Aharon of Sadigura (1877–1913), son of Yisrael Friedman of Sadigura. Rebbe from 1907 to 1913.
          - Avrohom Yaakov Friedman (1884–1961), son of Yisrael Friedman of Sadigura. Rebbe from 1907 to 1961.
            - Mordechai Sholom Yosef Friedman (1897–1979), son of Aharon of Sadigura. Rebbe from 1907 to 1979.
              - Avrohom Yaakov Friedman of Bnei Brak (1928–2013). Rebbe from 1979 to 2013.
                - Tzvi Yisrael Moshe Friedman of Bnei Brak (b. 1955-2020). Rebbe from 2013 to 2020.
                  - Yitzchok Yehoshua Heshel Friedman (b. 1996), son of Yisrael Moshe. Rebbe from 2020.
