= Avrohom Yaakov Friedman (third Sadigura rebbe) =

Third Sadigura Rebbe

Avrohom Yaakov Friedman אברהם יעקב פרידמן
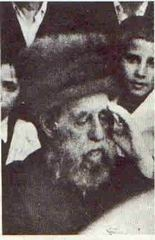
- Title: Third Sadigura Rebbe

Personal life
- Born: Avrohom Yaakov Friedman; July 30, 1884 Sadigura, Bukovina
- Died: December 24, 1961 (aged 77) Tel Aviv, Israel
- Buried: Tel Aviv
- Spouse: Bluma Raizel Heschel
- Parent: Yisrael Friedman of Sadigura (father)
- Dynasty: Sadigura

Religious life
- Religion: Judaism

Jewish leader
- Predecessor: Rabbi Yisrael Friedman of Sadigura
- Began: 1907
- Ended: 1961
- Main work: Avir Yaakov
- Dynasty: Sadigura

Avrohom Yaakov Friedman, in English also spelled Abraham Jacob Friedman (Hebrew: אברהם יעקב פרידמן; July 30, 1884 – December 24, 1961) was the third Rebbe of the Sadigura Hasidic dynasty. He was a prominent Jewish leader in Vienna in the interwar period and in the nascent State of Israel, where he established his court in Tel Aviv. He was one of the first members of Agudat Israel and occupied a seat on the Moetzes Gedolei HaTorah.

== Early life ==
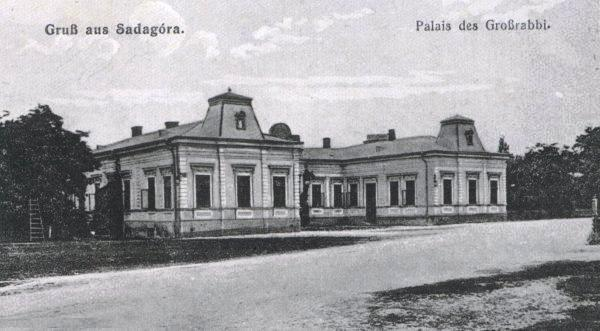
Palatial home of the Sadigura Rebbe in Sadigura

Avrohom Yaakov Friedman was the fifth child of Rabbi Yisrael Friedman of Sadigura (1853–1907). He was the grandson of Rabbi Avrohom Yaakov Friedman, the first Sadigura Rebbe; and the great-grandson of Rabbi Yisrael Friedman of Ruzhyn, founder of the Ruzhiner Hasidic dynasty. He was born within the year of mourning for his paternal grandfather and was named after him. He had four brothers: Rabbi Aharon of Sadigura (the Kedushas Aharon) (1877–1913), Rabbi Shlomo Yosef of Chernovitz, Rabbi Yitzhak of Rimanov, and Rabbi Shlomo Chaim (Reb Shlomenu) of Sadigura (1887–1972).

It is said that his father loved him the most of all his sons. He assiduously spent many hours in Torah study. He was engaged at the age of 11 to Bluma Raizel, daughter of Rabbi Yitzhak Meir Heschel of Kopychyntsi, the Kopshitzer Rebbe; they married when he was 18.

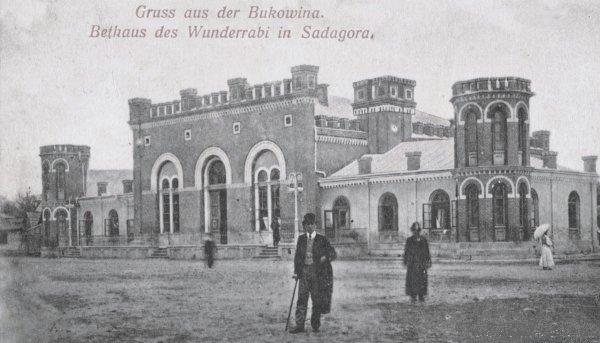
The Sadigura synagogue in Sadhora

Upon his father's death in 1907, he and his brothers all became Rebbes, making their courts and conducting their tishen in different halls in the great Sadigura synagogue. Rabbi Yisrael's eldest son, the Kedushas Aharon, died six years later, in 1912, and was succeeded by his 16-year-old son, Rabbi Mordechai Sholom Yosef Friedman.

In 1914, with the outbreak of World War I, Rabbi Avrohom Yaakov fled to Vienna together with his younger brother, Rabbi Shlomo Chaim, and his orphaned nephew, Rabbi Mordechai Sholom Yosef. Rabbi Avrohom Yaakov established his court in Vienna and led the Sadigura Hasidim from that city for the next 24 years. The relocation of the Sadigura Rebbes to Vienna effectively put an end to the once-flourishing Jewish community in Sadigura, which comprised more than 5,000 Jews before World War I. The remaining Jews of the town were decimated by the Nazis during World War II.

== Move to Israel ==
During the Anschluss of 1938, the Nazis entered Vienna and subjected leading rabbis to public humiliation. The Sadigura Rebbe was seized and forced to sweep the streets in front of laughing Germans. The Rebbe vowed that if he could escape Austria and get to the Land of Israel, he would gladly sweep the streets there. His Hasidim obtained a visa for him that year and for many months after he arrived in Tel Aviv, he swept the streets around his house early each morning. He stopped this practice only after one of his Hasidim noticed what he was doing. He established his court on Nachmani Street.

Thousands of Sadigura Hasidim were murdered in the Holocaust, leaving the Rebbe with only a few dozen followers. Nonetheless, he continued to lead his Hasidim with dignity. He conducted his court in Tel Aviv for 22 years until his death in 1961.

The Rebbe was actively involved in Jewish communal life in the new state of Israel. He was one of the first members of Agudat Israel and occupied a seat on the Moetzes Gedolei HaTorah. He served as the "conscience" of Agudat Israel, steering the organization away from politics and toward its mission of religious advocacy.

An epitome of honesty and truthfulness, he did not use polemics or protests to get his point across, but sincerity and straightforwardness. He always acceded to the majority view, even if it did not agree with his own.

== Personal ==
The Rebbe was considered a tzadik and great Jewish leader. He was known for his wisdom and clear-cut, decisive answers. He was particular not to inconvenience others or accept favors from others. Like other Rebbes of the Ruzhiner dynasty, he was humble and modest on the outside, while on the inside he burned with love of God and fierce allegiance to Torah and mitzvahs.

The Rebbe and his wife were childless.

== Final years and legacy ==
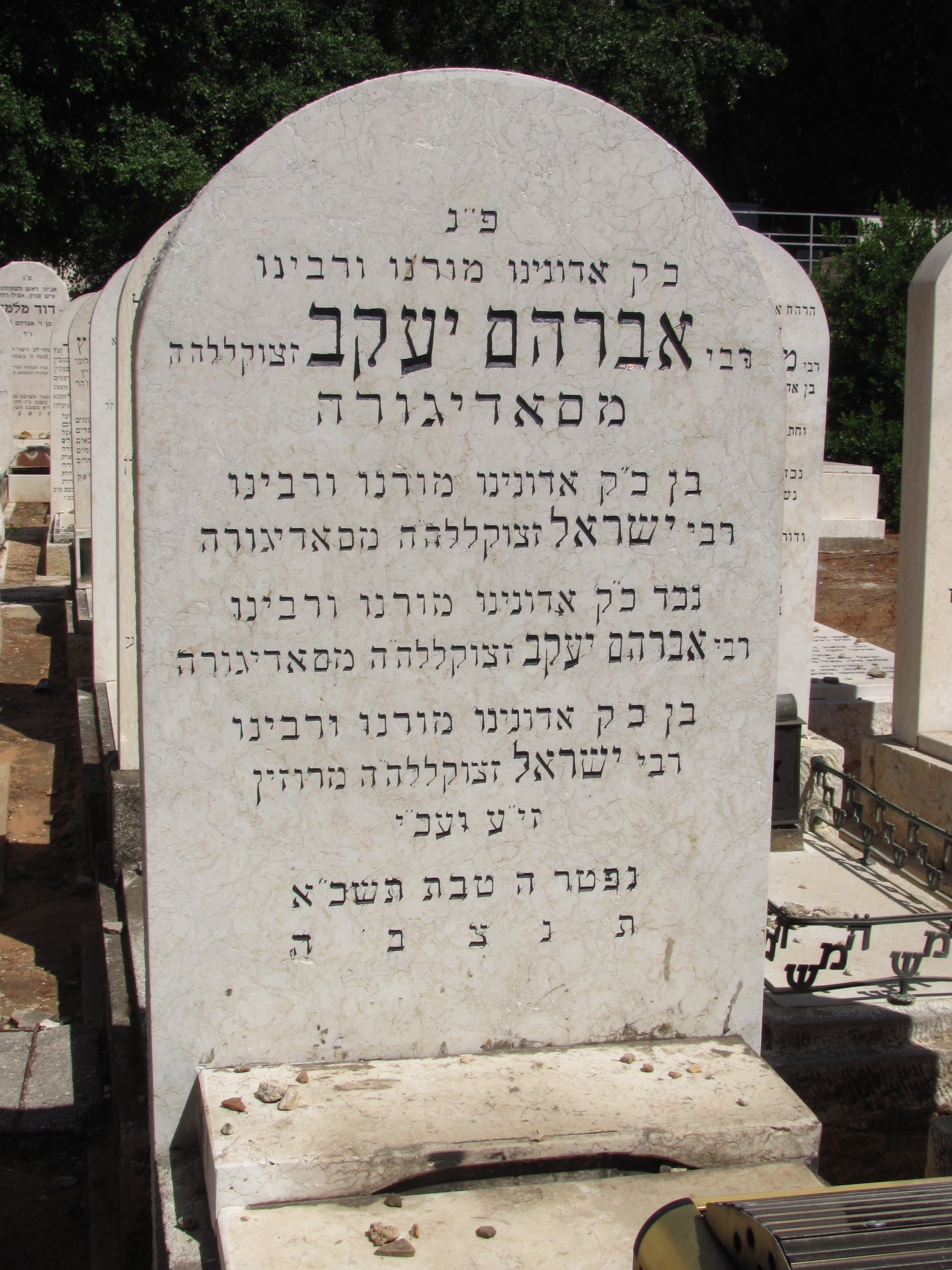
The third Sadigura Rebbe's gravestone in the Nahalat Yitzhak Cemetery, Givatayim, Israel.

The Rebbe's wife died three years before him. He died on December 24, 1961 (5 Tevet 5721) and was buried in the Ruzhiner section of the Nahalat Yitzhak Cemetery in Givatayim.

His divrei Torah were collected in a volume under the name Hebrew: אביר יעקב (Avir Yaakov).

His Hasidim asked his younger brother, Rabbi Shlomo Chaim, to succeed him, but the latter demurred. He did agree to sit in his brother's place at tishen held on Jewish holidays and on the yahrtzeits of his Ruzhiner and Sadigura ancestors. Meanwhile, the Sadigura dynasty continued through the Rebbe's nephew, Rabbi Mordechai Sholom Yosef Friedman (1897–1979), who led Sadigura Hasidim in Sadigura and Przemyśl before emigrating to Tel Aviv in 1939. Upon his death in 1979, Rabbi Mordechai Sholom Yosef was succeeded by his son, Rabbi Avrohom Yaakov Friedman (1928–2013), who moved the Sadigura court from Tel Aviv to Bnei Brak. He was succeeded by his only son, Rabbi Yisrael Moshe Friedman of Bnei Brak, until his passing in 2020.

== Lineage of Sadigura dynastic leadership ==
- Yisrael Friedman of Ruzhyn, Ruzhiner Rebbe (1797–1850). Re-established his court in Sadigura in 1842.
  - Sholom Yosef Friedman (1813–1851), son of Yisrael Friedman of Ruzhyn. Rebbe from 1850 to 1851.
    - Avrohom Yaakov Friedman (1820–1883), son of Yisrael Friedman of Ruzhyn. Rebbe from 1851 to 1883.
      - Yisrael Friedman of Sadigura (1852–1907), son of Avrohom Yaakov Friedman of Sadigura. Rebbe from 1883 to 1907.
        - Aharon of Sadigura (1877–1913), son of Yisrael Friedman of Sadigura. Rebbe from 1907 to 1913.
          - Avrohom Yaakov Friedman (1884–1961), son of Yisrael Friedman of Sadigura. Rebbe from 1913 to 1961.
            - Mordechai Sholom Yosef Friedman (1897–1979), son of Aharon of Sadigura. Rebbe from 1961 to 1979.
              - Avrohom Yaakov Friedman of Bnei Brak (1928–2013). Rebbe from 1979 to 2013.
                - Yisrael Moshe Friedman of Bnei Brak (1955-2020). Rebbe from 2013 to 2020.
                  - Yitschok Yehoshua Heschel Friedman of Bnei Brak (2020). Current Rebbe
