= Sadhora =

Sadhora Садгора
- Part of Chernivtsi
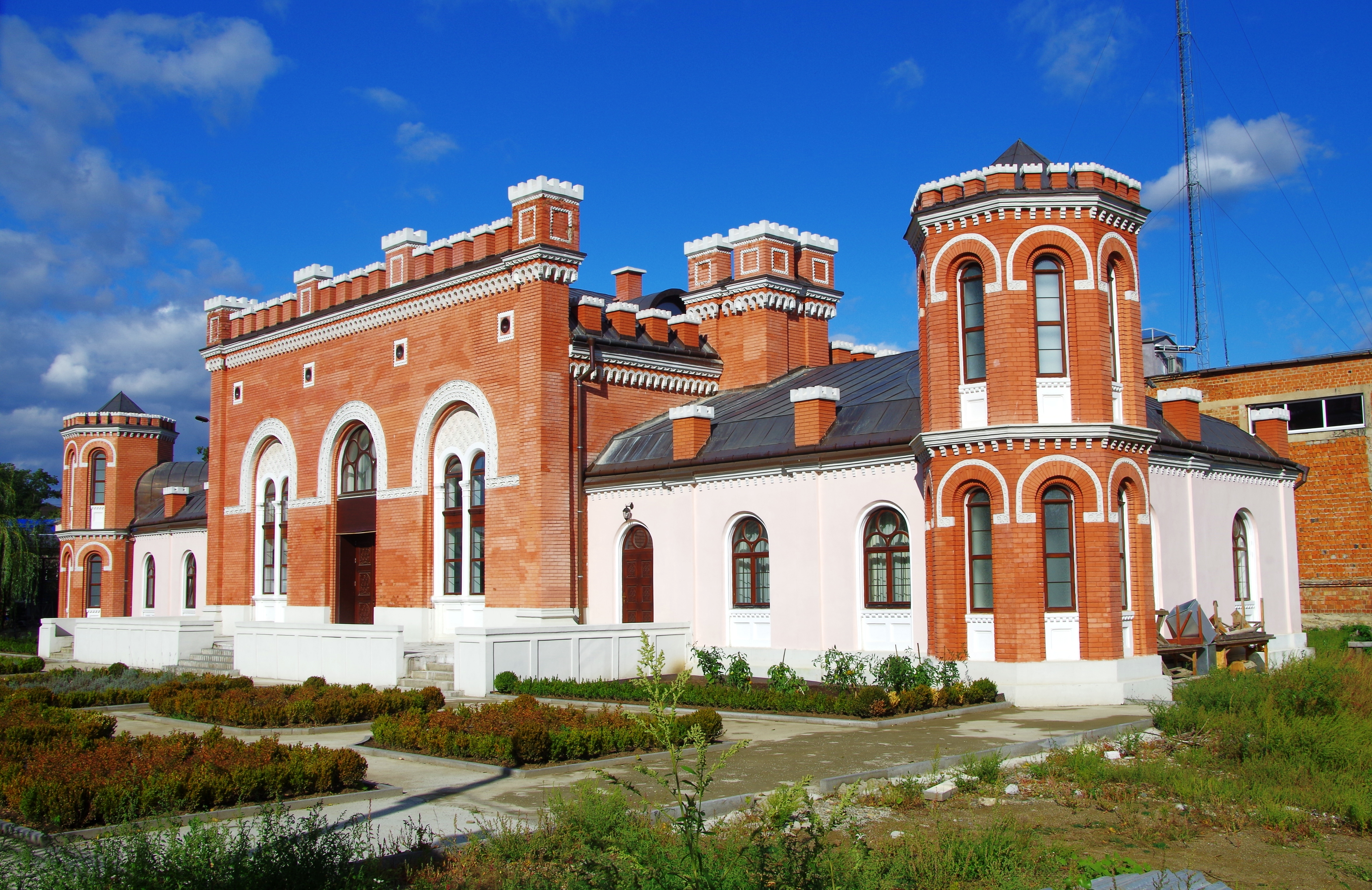
- Sadhora Synagogue
- Interactive map of Sadhora
- Location within Chernivtsi Oblast Location within Ukraine
- Coordinates: 48°21′N 25°58′E
- Country: Ukraine
- Oblast: Chernivtsi Oblast
- Raion: Chernivtsi Raion
- Founder: Piotr Mikołaj Gartenberg Sadogórski
- Named for: Piotr Mikołaj Gartenberg Sadogórski
- Time zone: UTC+2 (EET)
  - Summer (DST): UTC+3 (EEST)

Sadhora (Ukrainian: Садгора; German: Sadagora; Polish: Sadagóra; Romanian: Sadagura; Yiddish: סאדיגורא Sadigora, also Sadagura and Sadiger) is a settlement in Ukraine, now the Sadhirskyi District of Chernivtsi city, which is located 6 km from the city center. Previously, it was an independent town.

== History ==
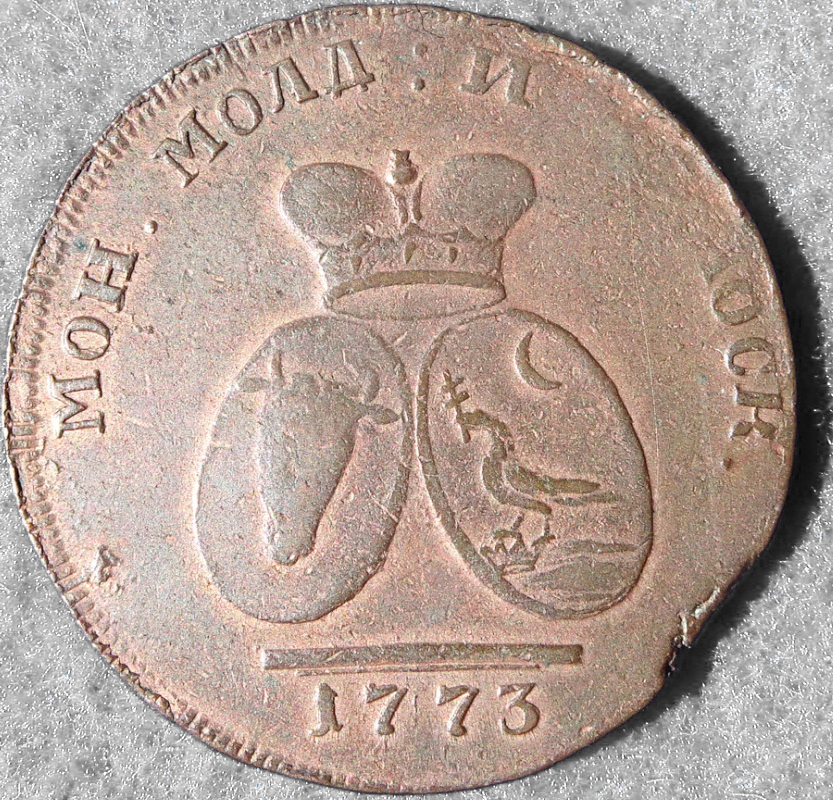
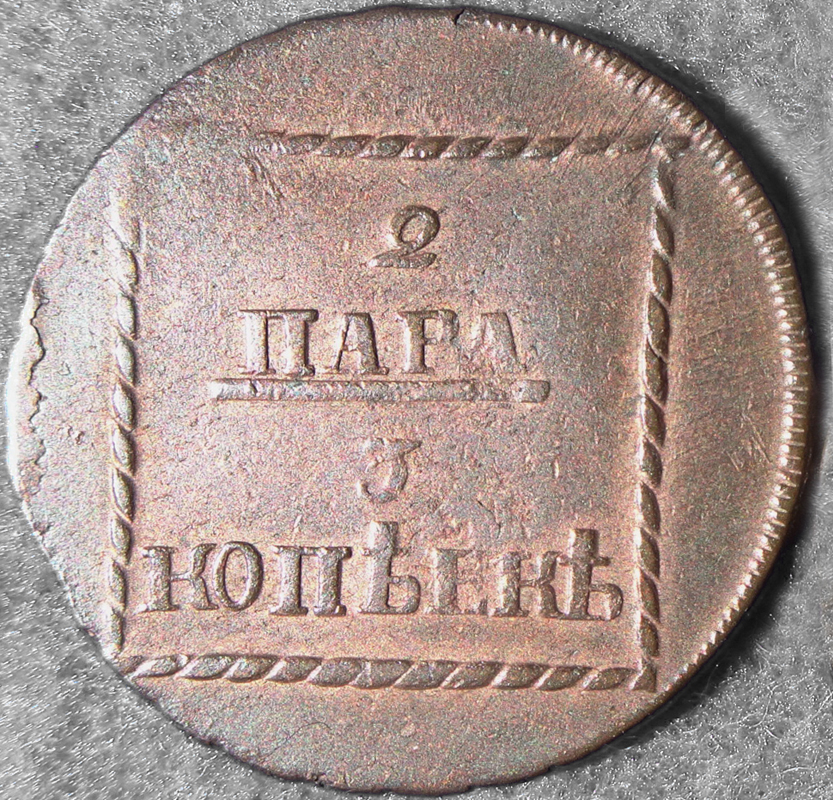
2 Turkish Paras / 3 Russian Kopecks from Sadhora mint, struck 1773 from the bronze of seized Turkish cannons; obverse: Coat of arms of Moldavia (aurochs) and Wallachia (eagle with half moon) under Russian crown / reverse: Value

The settlement was established in 1770 by former Saxon and Polish official of Danish origin and then commander-in-chief of the Russian army in Moldavia and Wallachia, Baron Piotr Mikołaj Gartenberg Sadogórski, and named Sadogóra after him. During the Russo-Turkish War of 1768–1774, he established a mint in a formerly wooded area by a river to mint coins to make payments for his soldiers. Beginning in 1771, the coins that were minted at Sadogóra displayed the coats of arms of both Moldavia and Wallachia on the same side. The mint was closed down at the end of the war, in 1774. The local Catholic church of Saint Michael was founded in 1778. A chapel of the dissolved nunnery from Revna was moved to Sadogóra in 1787.

Sadhora is located in Bukovina, a region which was part of the Principality of Moldavia until the 1770s when it was conquered by the Habsburg monarchy, becoming part of the Duchy of Bukovina under the Austrian Empire starting in 1849, then becoming an Austrian "crownland" from 1867 until the end of World War I, after which it was part of Romania in 1918–1940. According to the 1930 Romanian census, the population was 63.1% Ukrainian, 16.3% Jewish, 14.9% Polish, 4.0% Romanian and 1.1% German.

== Jewish history ==
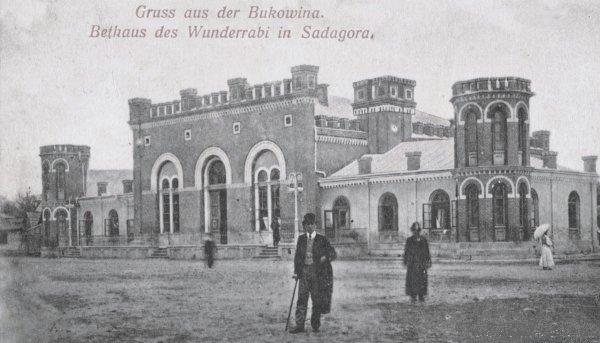
Hasidic synagogue

Sadagóra had a significant Jewish community and it is important in the history of Hasidic Judaism. Before World War I, the Jewish population numbered over 5,000.

Rabbi Yisroel Friedman, the Ruzhiner Rebbe, relocated his court to Sadagóra in 1842. In 1838 he had been accused of complicity in the death of two Jews accused of being informers and was imprisoned for two years by the Russian authorities. On his release he fled to Chișinău, then to Iași and other places before finally settling in Sadagóra in 1842, where he re-established his Hasidic court in all its glory.

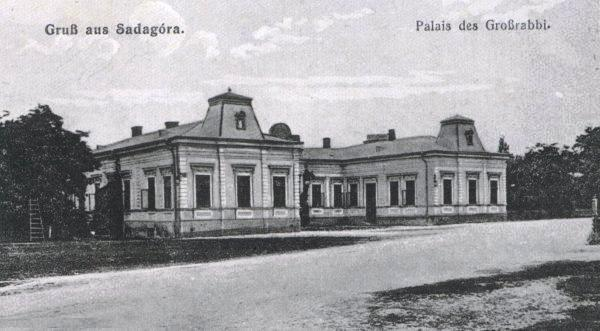
Palace of the Ruzhin dynasty

The Ruzhiner Rebbe lived in Sadagóra for ten years, building a palatial home and a large synagogue. Tens of thousands of Hasidim frequented his court. When he died at the age of 54 on 9 October 1850, each of his sons moved to different towns to establish their own courts. His eldest son, Rabbi Sholom Yosef Friedman, remained in Sadagóra to continue leading the court his father had founded, but died ten months later. At this point, the second son of the Ruzhiner Rebbe, Rabbi Avrohom Yaakov Friedman, assumed the mantle of leadership of the Sadigura Hasidim, becoming known as the first Sadigura Rebbe. After his death, his second son, Rabbi Yisrael Friedman (1852-1907), succeeded him as Rebbe. He, in turn, was succeeded by his eldest son, Rabbi Aharon of Sadigura (1877-1913), and by another son, Rabbi Avrohom Yaakov Friedman, who escaped to Vienna with the outbreak of World War I in 1914 and established his court in that city for the next 24 years, effectively putting an end to the once-flourishing Jewish community in Sadagóra . The remaining Jews of Sadagóra were decimated by the Nazis during World War II. After the Anschluss of 1938, the Sadigura Rebbe procured a visa to Palestine, where he led his court in Tel Aviv until his death in 1961. Today, Sadigura Hasidism is centered in Bnei Brak, Israel.

== Geography ==
Historical population
Year	Pop.	±%
1869	6,009	—
1880	5,019	−16.5%
1930	8,968	+78.7%

Altitude (feet), 941

== Notable people ==
- Aharon Appelfeld, writer and novelist
- Avrohom Yaakov Friedman (1820-1883), first Sadigura Rebbe
- Avrohom Yaakov Friedman (1884-1961), third Sadigura Rebbe
- Yisroel Friedman (1797-1850), Rebbe of Ruzhin
- Yitzchok Friedman (1850-1917), first Boyaner Rebbe
- Yossele Rosenblatt, chazzan
- Wojciech Rubinowicz (1889–1974), Polish theoretical physicist who made contributions in quantum mechanics, mathematical physics, and the theory of radiation
