= Mendel (name) =

Mendel can be both a surname and given name.

As a family name, Mendel occurs in many cultures and languages and is of south German origin. It relates to similar names such as Mendl and Meindl.

As a given name Mendel is mostly a Yiddish variant and affectionate form of the Hebrew name Menachem מנחם which means "comforter".

Notable people with the name include:

== Given name ==
- Mendel Jackson Davis (1942–2007), American attorney and politician from South Carolina
- Mendel Gdański, fictional character from short story by Maria Konopnicka
- Mendele Mocher Sforim (1836-1917), Yiddish author, born as Sholem Yankev Abramovich
- Mendel Portugali (1888–1917), leading figures in Second Aliya and founder of the Hashomer movement
- Mendel Rosenblum (born 1962), American associate professor of computer science
- Mendel Sachs (1927–2012), American theoretical physicist and professor
- Mendel Shapiro, Jewish lawyer and Modern Orthodox Rabbi
- Mendel Weinbach (1933–2012), Orthodox rabbi
- Mendel Zaks (1898–1974), rabbi, Rosh Yeshiva in Raduń Yeshiva

== Surname ==
- Andrei Mendel (born 1995), Russian football midfielder
- Arthur Mendel (1905–1979), American musicologist
- August Neander (1789–1850), German theologian (born David Mendel)
- Barry Mendel (born 1963), American film producer
- Emanuel Mendel (1839-1907), German neurologist and psychiatrist
- Gérard Mendel (1930–2004), French psychoanalyst and psychiatrist
- Gregor Mendel (1822–1884), often called the "father of genetics"
- Henriette Mendel (1833–1891), German actress and mistress
- Iuliia Mendel (born 1986), Ukrainian journalist
- J. Michael Mendel (1964–2019), American television producer
- Lafayette Mendel (1872–1935), American biochemist
- Meron Mendel (born 1976), German social scientist, educator, writer and director
- Nate Mendel (born 1968), American musician
- Tudor Mendel (born 2005), English footballer

== See also ==
- Mandel
- Mendelsohn
- Mendelssohn
- Menachem Mendel
- Mendel (Hungarian family), a prominent Hungarian family that flourished in the 15th century.
