= Menahem (disambiguation) =

Menahem or Menachem was a Jewish king.

Menahem or Menachem may also refer to:

- Menachem or Manahen or Manaen, a teacher of the early Christian Church who, according to Acts 13:1, had been brought up with Herod the tetrarch
- Menahem the Essene, sage of the Second Temple period
- Menahem (Khazar), Khazar ruler
- Menachem Begin (1913–1992), 6th Prime Minister of Israel
- Menahem Ben (born 1948), Israeli poet and journalist
- Menahem ben Ammiel, character in apocalyptic Jewish texts
- Menahem Manus Bendetsohn (1817–1888), Russian Hebrew writer
- Menahem ben Judah, Jewish messiah claimant of the Second Temple period (may be the same person as Menahem ben Hezekiah)
- Menahem ben Saruq, medieval poet and philologist
- Menachem Ben-Sasson (born 1951), Israeli politician and president of Hebrew University of Jerusalem
- Menahem ben Solomon, medieval rabbi and author
- Menahem Azariah da Fano (1548–1620), Italian Talmudist and Kabbalist
- Menahem Saleh Daniel (1846–1940), Iraqi philanthropist
- Menahem Degani (1927–2018), Israeli basketball player
- Menachem Fisch, Israeli philosopher
- Menahem Gnessin (1882–1952), Russian-Israeli actor and Hebrew instructor
- Menahem Golan (1929–2014), Israeli film producer
- Menahem Shemuel Halevy (1884–1940), Iranian rabbi
- Menahem ben Aaron ibn Zerah (died 1385), Spanish rabbi
- Menachem Ilan (born 1960), Israeli Olympic sport shooter
- Menahem Lonzano, Masoreric scholar
- Menachem Magidor (born 1946), Israeli mathematician, president of the Hebrew University of Jerusalem
- Menahem of Merseburg (15th century), German rabbi and author
- Menahem Pressler (1923–2023), American pianist
- Menahem Rabinovich (1934–2012), Israeli biochemist
- Menahem Recanati (1223–1290), Italian rabbi and Kabbalist
- Menahem Max Schiffer (1911–1997), American mathematician
- Menachem Stark (1974–2014), American businessman who was kidnapped and murdered in a botched robbery
- Menahem Stern (1925–1989), Israeli historian
- Menahem Yaari (born 1935), Israeli economist

== Other ==
- Menachem Av, a Hebrew month

== See also ==
- Menachem Mendel, a given name
