= Mendel =

Mendel may refer to:

== People ==
- Mendel (name), includes a list of people with the name

- Gregor Mendel (1822–1884), the "father of modern genetics"

- Mendel (Hungarian family), a prominent Hungarian family that flourished in the 15th century
- Yiddish diminutive of Hebrew name Menahem or Menachem

== Other ==
- Mendel University in Brno in the Czech Republic (formerly Mendel University of Agriculture and Forestry)
- Mendel Biotechnology, a plant biotechnology company in Hayward, California
- Mendel (lunar crater), a crater on the Moon
- Mendel (Martian crater)
- 3313 Mendel, an asteroid named after Gregor Mendel
- Mendelpass, a mountain pass in Northern Italy
- RepRap 2.0 (Mendel), a self-replicating machine

== See also ==
- Mendel Polar Station in Antarctica
- L. Mendel Rivers (1905–1970), US Congressman
- USS L. Mendel Rivers (SSN-686), a US submarine
- Mendele
- Mandel
- Mendelssohn
- Mendl, a surname
- Meindl (disambiguation)
- Mende (disambiguation)
