= Julius Meinl (disambiguation) =

Julius Meinl may refer to:

- The Julius Meinl group, operator of supermarkets and cafés
- Julius Meinl I, founder of the company
- Julius Meinl V, great-great-grandson of Julius Meinl I
