= Menachem Mendel =

Menachem Mendel (Menahem Mendl) is a masculine Jewish first name. The name is sometimes used as either just Menachem or just Mendel. Menachem means to console or comfort, Mendel is a diminutive of Menachem. In 2005, Menachem was the 79th most popular name for boys, and the 38th most popular for white boys, born in New York City, and 971st most popular name for boys born in the USA.

Notable people with this name include:

- Menachem Mendel Krochmal of Nikolsburg (c. 1600 – 1660), known as the "Tzemach Tzedek"
- Menachem Mendel of Vitebsk (c.1730 – c.1787), early leader of Hasidic Judaism and primary disciple of Dovber of Mezeritch, also known as "Menachem Mendel of Horodok".
- Menachem Mendel of Rimanov (1745 – 1815), Torah scholar and student of Elimelech of Lizhensk
- Menachem Mendel Lefin (1749–1826), early leader of the Haskalah
- Menachem Mendel Hager of Kosov (1768 – 1825), founding Rebbe of Kosov
- Menachem Mendel of Kotzk (1787 – 1859), Hassidic Rebbe, and student of Simcha Bunim of Peshischa
- Menachem Mendil Hager, the first Vizhnitzer Rebbe, also known as the "Tzemach Tzadik"
- Menachem Mendel Schneersohn (1789 – 1866), the third Lubavitcher Rebbe, also known as the "New Tzemach Tzedek", or the "Tzemach Tzedek of Lubavitch"
- Menahem Mendel Beilis (1874 - 1934) who was wrongly accused of ritual murder
- Menachem Mendel Kasher (1895 – 1983), rabbi and author of the encyclopedic Torah Shleima
- Menachem Mendel Schneerson (1902 – 1994), the seventh Lubavitcher Rebbe
- Menachem Mendel Taub (1923 – 2019), Holocaust survivor and Rebbe of Kaliv (Hasidic dynasty)
- Menachem Mendel Hager (b. 1957), Rebbe of Vizhnitz

== Fictional characters ==
- Menahem-Mendl, Sholem Aleichem's character from a series of tales collected into books
