= Yisroel Hager (the second) =

Grand Rabbi of Vizhnitz Bnei Brak, Israel

Rabbi Yisroel Hager ישראל הגר
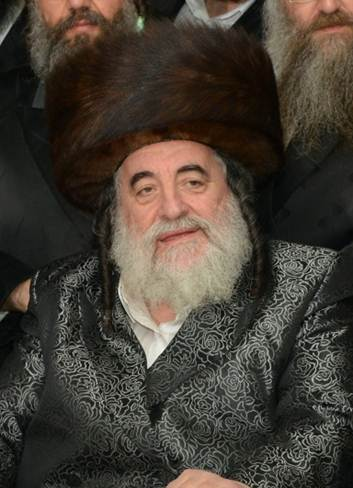
- Yisroel Hager
- Title: Sixth Vizhnitzer Rebbe

Personal life
- Born: April 19, 1945 (age 81) Tel Aviv, British Mandate of Palestine
- Spouse: Sarah Chana Chaya Twersky
- Children: Malka Henia Twersky, Miriam Hager, Rechel Dvorah Meisles, Chaim Meir Hager, Yitzchok Shaye Hager, Tzipporah Bracha Teitelbaum, Yakov Mordechai Hager, Sheindel Hager
- Parents: Moshe Yehoshua Hager (father); Leah Esther Paneth (mother)
- Dynasty: Vizhnitz

Religious life
- Religion: Judaism

Jewish leader
- Predecessor: Moshe Yehoshua Hager
- Began: 2012
- Ended: present
- Dynasty: Vizhnitz

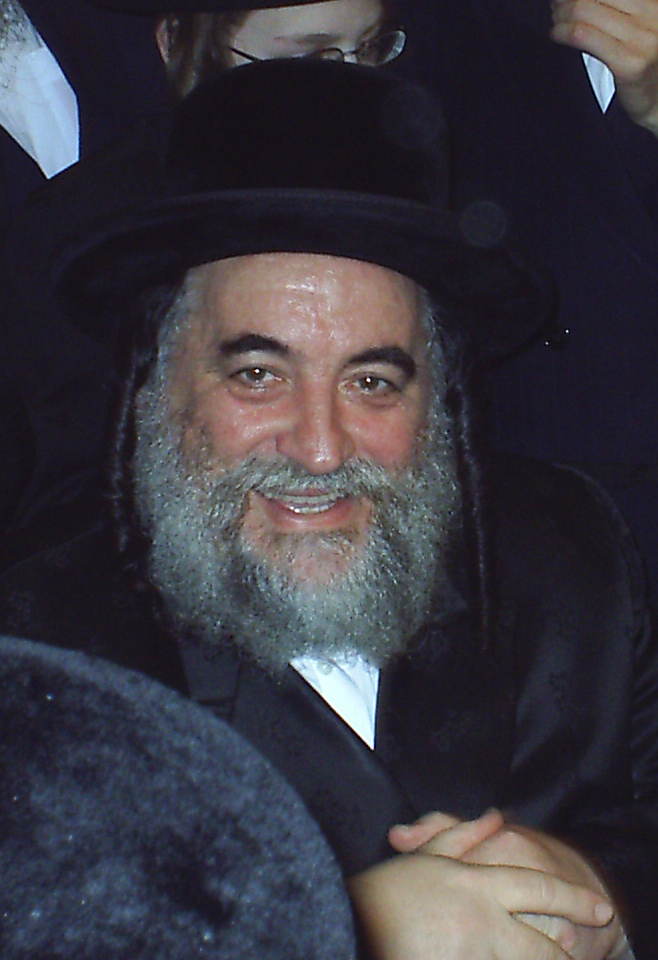
In his younger years

Yisroel Hager, also known as Yisroel Hager the Younger, (Hebrew: ישראל הגר; born April 19, 1945) is one of the two Grand Rabbis of Vizhnitz in Bnei Brak and a member of Moetzes Gedolei HaTorah (Council of great Torah Sages) of Agudat Israel.

== Early life and biography ==
Hager was born in Tel Aviv in 1945 to Rabbi Moshe Yehoshua Hager, who preceded him as Grand Rabbi of Vizhnitz followers in Bnei Brak, and his wife, Leah Esther. Hager's parents and grandfather had managed to escape the Holocaust in Northern Transylvania, fleeing across the border to Arad in May 1944. From there, the family made their way to Bucharest, and in August 1944, Hager's parents sailed from Constanța and arrived in Haifa. Rabbi Moshe and Leah Esther were imprisoned briefly by the British authorities in the Atlit detainee camp, but were released after three days thanks to community pressure.

The infant Yisroel Hager's brit milah was performed by Rabbi Baruch Yehoshua Yerachmiel Rabinowicz, the Munkacser Rebbe. Hager was brought up and educated first in Tel Aviv, then in the Kiryat Vizhnitz neighborhood of Bnei Brak.

On June 2, 1963, at the age of 18, he married Sarah Chaya Chana Twersky, the daughter of Meshulom Zishe Twersky, previous Grand Rabbi of Chernobyl in Bnei Brak. Shortly after his marriage, he was appointed by his grandfather Grand Rabbi Chaim Meir Hager (1887-1972), to serve as a rabbi of the Vizhnitz synagogue and a few years later, in 1972 (after his grandfather died and his father took over the leadership of the Vizhnitz Chassidim), he served as the Chief Rabbi of the Kiryas Vizhnitz neighborhood in Bnei Brak.

In 1984, his father's orders, he was removed from his position as a Chief Rabbi and was exiled from the Vizhnitz neighborhood as well. In 1990, his father appointed his younger brother, Menachem Mendel Hager, as a Chief Rabbi of Kiryas Vizhnitz . After nearly 18 years of boycott, and after Hager was involved in a car accident, suffered from severe injuries and was hospitalized in a critical condition, his father agreed to visit him, and he reconciled with his father and resumed his position as a Chief Rabbi and the main heir apparent of his father's followers. Upon his father's death in March 2012, although both he and his brother succeeded him as Rebbe, the lion's share of his father's followers chose him.

== Family ==
Rabbi Yisroel and Rebbetzin Sarah Chaya Chana have eight children - three sons and five daughters:

- Rebbezin Malka Henya, married her first cousin, Rabbi Yitzchok, son of Grand Rabbi David Twersky of Skverer Hassidim in New Square, New York.
- Rebbetzin Miriam, the wife of her father's first cousin, Rabbi Boruch Shamshon Hager, Grand Rabbi of Vizhnitz in Beit Shemesh, Israel.
- Rebbetzin Rechel Dvorah, the wife of Rabbi Chaim Tzvi Meislish, grandson of Grand Rabbi Moshe Teitelbaum of Satmar. Serves as a Chief Rabbi and a rosh yeshiva of the Satmar community in Israel.
- Rabbi Chaim Meir, used to serve as rabbi of Vizhnitz in Borough Park, Brooklyn. He is married to Rebbetzin Ratza Hendel, daughter of Rabbi Aharon Teitelbaum of Nirbatur community in Borough Park. In 2020, he relocated to B'nei B'rak where his father appointed him as his deputy and Rov of the Vizhnitz community there. Most of his followers consider this a signal that he was to succeed his father as Rebbe.
- Rabbi Yitzchok Shaye, married Rebbetzin Sarah Leah, daughter of Grand Rabbi Dov Berish Paneth of Deyzh in Jerusalem.
- Rebbetzin Tzippora Bracha, the wife of Rabbi Naftoli Tzvi, son of Rabbi Nochum Efraim Teitelbaum of the Volove community in Borough Park
- Rabbi Yakov Mordechai, married Rebbetzin Sheva Rachel, the daughter of Rabbi Avrohom Boruch Rottenberg of Kosson Lakewood.
- Rebbetzin Sheindel, the wife of Rabbi Menachem Mendel, son of Rabbi Yisroel Eliezer Hager, Chief Rabbi of Seret Vizhnitz Hassidim in Jerusalem.
