= Meinl =

Meinl may refer to:

- Meinl (surname)
- Julius Meinl International, a manufacturer and retailer of coffee, gourmet foods and other grocery products
- Meinl-Weston, a manufacturer of brass instruments, based in Geretsried, Germany and formerly based in Graslitz; named after Anton Meinl
- Meinl Percussion, a brand of cymbals and general percussion instruments, based in Gutenstetten, Germany; named after Roland Meinl

== See also ==
- Meindl (disambiguation)
- Meinhard, community in the Werra-Meißner-Kreis in Hesse, Germany
