= Resignation (disambiguation) =

A resignation is the formal act of giving up or quitting one's office or position.

Resignation may also refer to:

- Fatalism, an attitude of resignation in the face of future inevitable events
- "Resignation" (House), the twenty-second episode of the third season of House
- The Resignation, a 2003 Rx Bandits album
- Resignation (Friedrich Schiller), a poem by Friedrich Schiller
- Resignation syndrome, a dissociative syndrome that induces a catatonic state
- General George Washington Resigning His Commission, an 1824 painting by John Trumbull

Resign may also refer to:

- Resign (chess), the concession of a loss of a game of chess before it proceeds to checkmate. The term "resign" to surrender a game is also found in Go.
- Resigned (album), an album from 1997 by singer-songwriter Michael Penn
