= Shraga Feivish Hager =

American rabbi (1958–2024)

Grand Rabbi Shraga Feivish Hager (January 10, 1958 – June 29, 2024), also known as the Kosover Rebbe, was the rebbe of the Kosov Hasidic dynasty, a dayan ("rabbinic judge"), and noted orator.

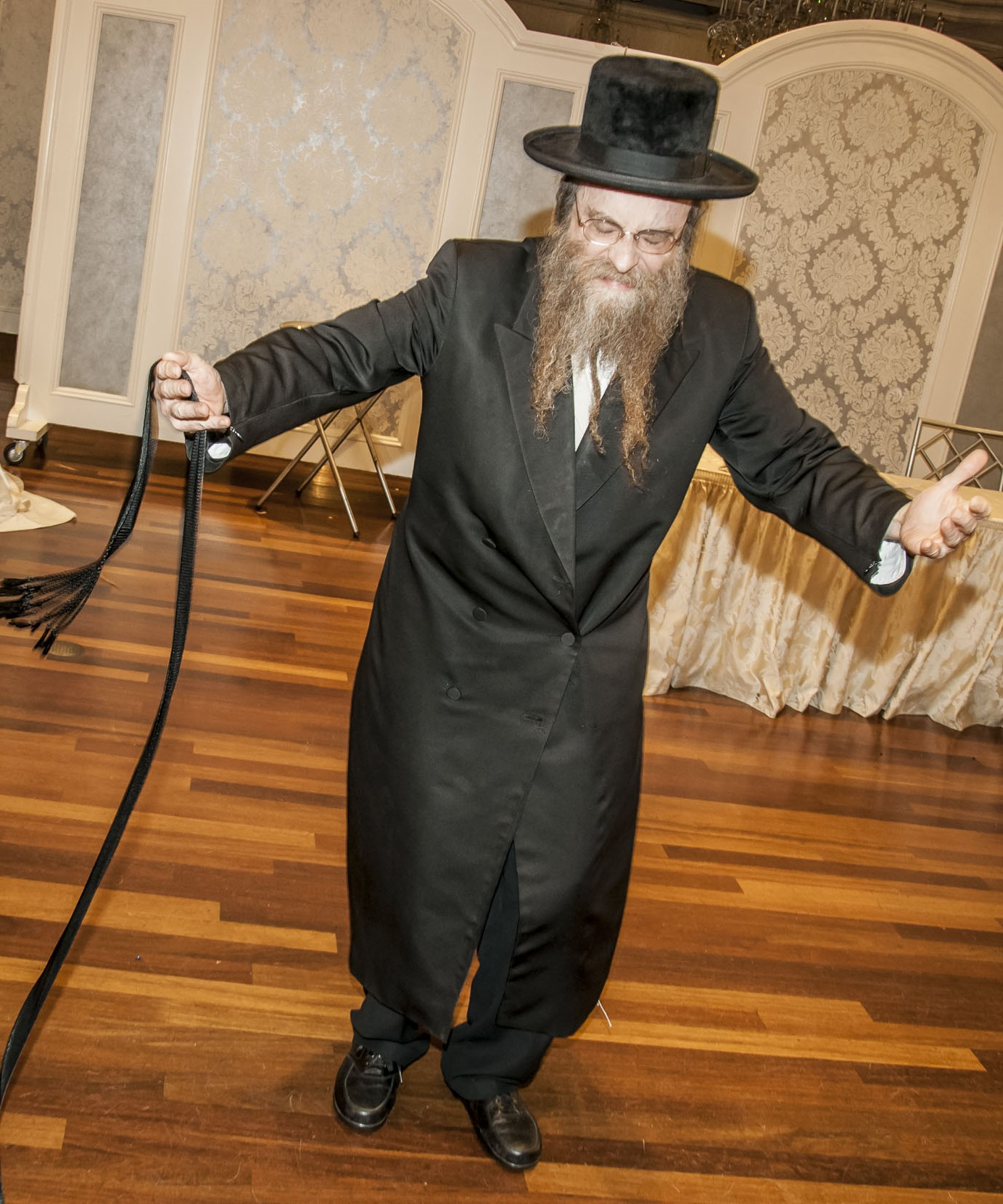
Hager dancing in 2012

== Personal life ==
Hager was born on January 10, 1958. He was an alumnus of the Chachmei Lublin, Ponevezh, and Lakewood yeshivos. After getting married, he lived in Bnei Brak on the same block as Rabbi Chaim Kanievsky. He spent time in Shikun Viznitz for the tish and prayers of Vizhnitz Rebbe, Rabbi Moshe Yoshua Hager. When he later moved to the States, where he resided in Borough Park, Brooklyn, New York, he was part of Tartokov Kollel and Beis Din. He spent time at the Bais Horaah of the Debrecen Rav, Rabbi Moshe Stern. He considered himself a Talmud mivhak of Rabbi Fishel Hershkowitz, who was in Williamsburg.

== Family ==
Hager was the successor and eldest son of Holocaust survivor Rabbi Avrohom Yehoshua Heshel Hager, Kosover-Zalishchiker Rebbe of Borough Park (died 1999), who was the son of Rabbi Shraga Feivish Hager (1870–1937), Zalishchiker Rebbe and son of Rabbi Boruch Hager (1845–1892) of Vizhnitz. Rav Avraham Yehoshua Heschel’s mother, Rachel Hager was the daughter of Rav Moshe Hager, the Leket Oni of Kossov. Shraga Feivish Hager was married to Sara Rachel, daughter of Rabbi Chaim Wosner. Rabbi Hager's younger brother was crowned as Zalishchiker Rebbe. The brothers jointly republished the Leket Oni in 1996.

== Rabbinical career ==
Hager was the dayan of the Vizhnitz community in Borough Park as well as posek for Chesed shel Emes. He was well-known for his role regarding contemporary Halacha and was not afraid to be actively involved on taboo issues among Haredim, and more specifically, on controversies where the old traditional Jewish lifestyle clashes with the modern world. He was humbly behind getting the consensus of the religious community to not ban computers and internet altogether, but to encourage strong filters.

== The Tish ==
Rabbi Hager's "tish" is less conventional than most since it started in a very grass-roots way. From the Friday night after the shivah for his father, a small group of individuals walked into his home uninvited during his family Shabbos meals turning it into a tish. They were literally begging him to be their spiritual Rebbe (Rabbi). His father, the Kosov Rebbe, was a quiet and humble person who had converted his dining room into a small Shabbos minyan, or "Shtiebel", simply as a Memorial to the town Kosov that was wiped out during the Holocaust. After he died and his son started running the minyan, many started to join the Rebbe and pray there. After many weeks and months of turning his home dining room into a racket, the Rebbe agreed to conduct some sort of a tish at the shtiebel but he started his meal at home and only finished the meal at the shtiebel. On very rare occasions, he would start the tish from the beginning. The traditional role of the "gabbai" was never hired or appointed by the Rebbe. It was simply a volunteer from the crowd. Years later, Rabbi Hager held a series of rabbinical teachings on the deeper, mystical meaning of fish. Towards the end of his Shabbos meal, he started eating fish heads, which meant he ended up eating fish twice - once at home and then again in public. He has a certain intensity when nibbling the fish heads that seemingly changes the very atmosphere in the room.

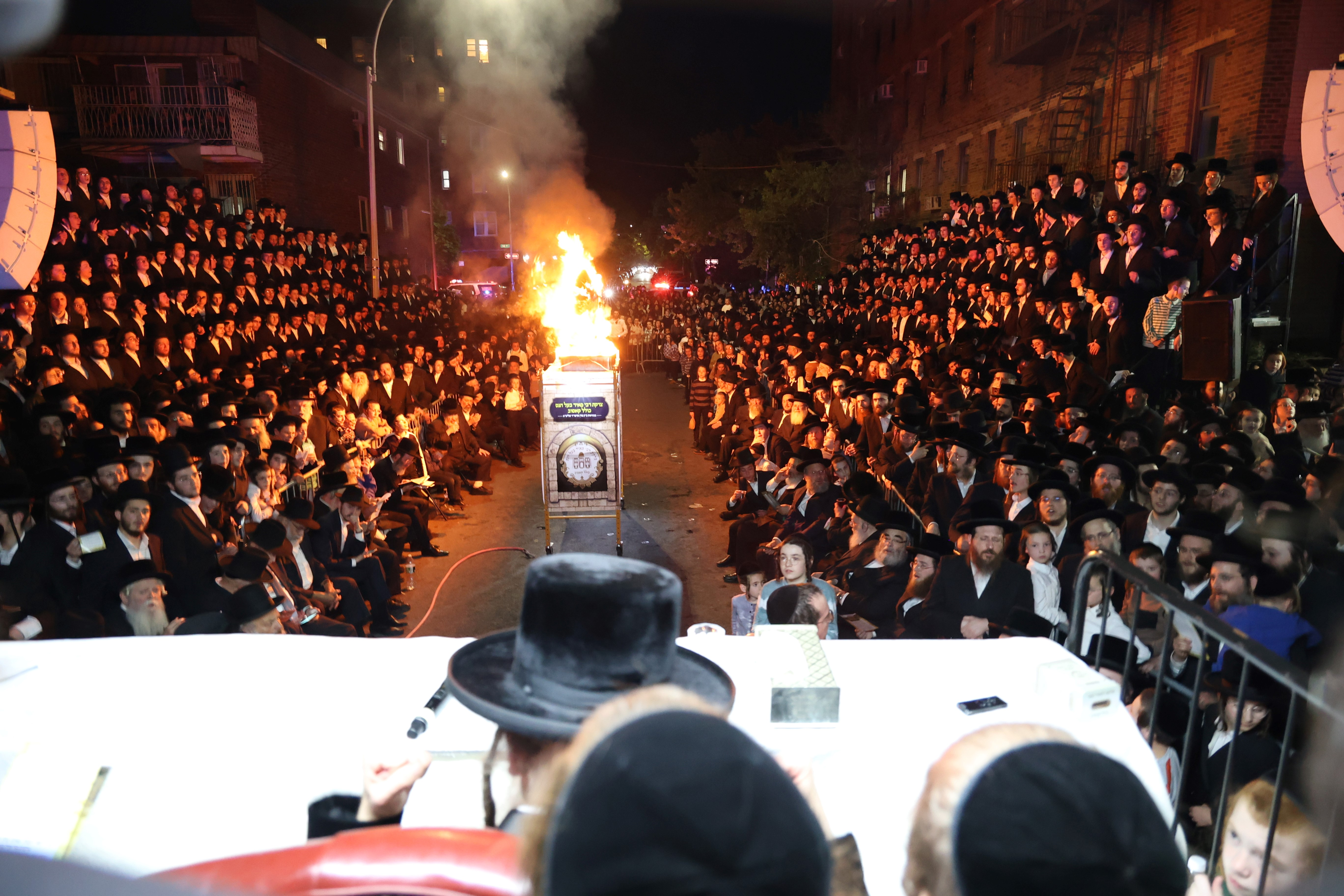
Rabbi Hager at a Lag Bomer celebration on 55th Street in 2023.

== During the COVID pandemic ==
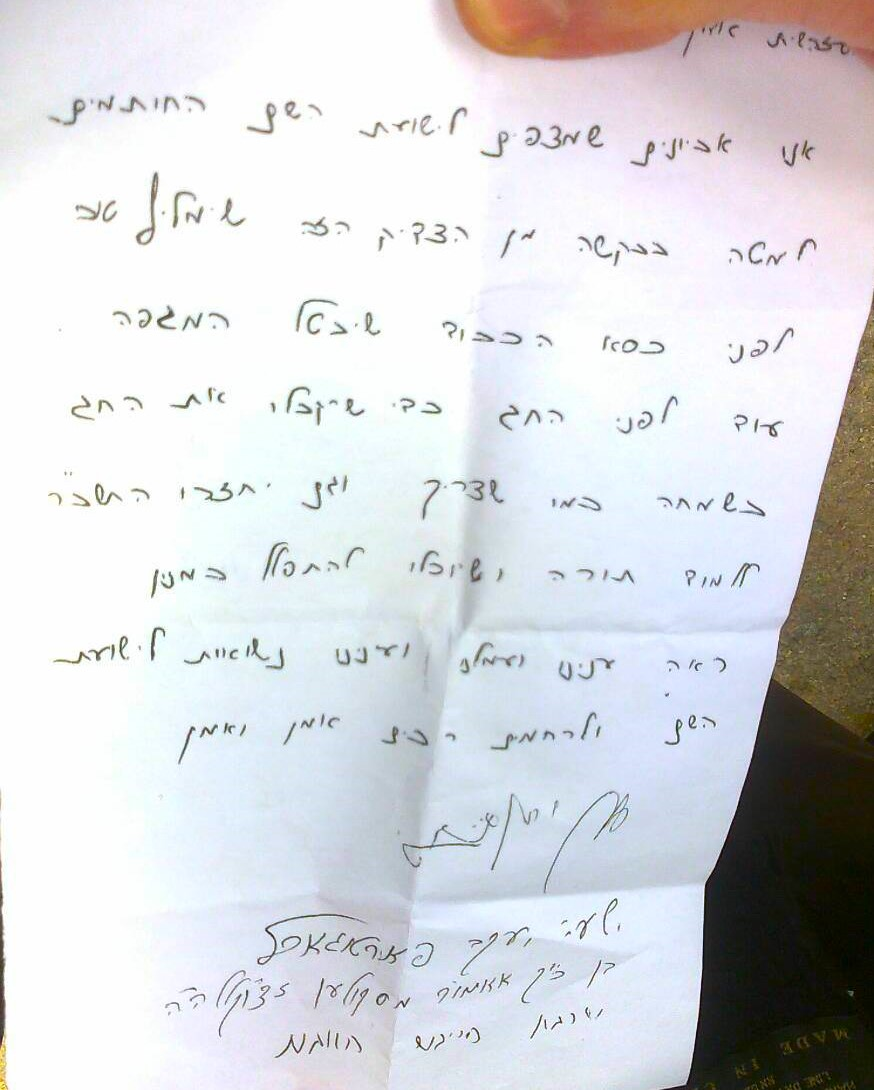
Pandemic Prayer Note For Burial of Tzadik

During the pandemic, the Rebbe called for an atzeres tefillah at the beginning of March on Tanis Ester. He collaborated extensively with the leadership of Chesed Shel Emes, who had prior experience dealing with the HIV/AIDS epidemic in the 1980s. The Rebbe organized a socially distant backyard minyan, where many residents of his block participated by staying on their porches or in their backyards. A note was included in the burial of the esteemed Tzadik, Rabbi Yosef Leifer, the Verdaner Rebbe of Flatbush, Brooklyn, who died on the 6th day of Nisan. The Rebbe was one of the few signatories on this note, which contained a heartfelt plea to the heavens for the pandemic to end. This practice, rooted in tradition, has been utilized by great Tzadikim during past pandemics, reflecting a profound spiritual response in times of crisis. As Passover approached, he provided virtual phone lessons on the Korban Pesach in the Beis Hamikdash. During Passover, he recorded a robocall with Assemblymember Simcha Eichenstein, urging people to stay home. He called on men to suspend their daily mikvah ritual. When some individuals contacted him, insisting they could find private places to continue their practice, the Rebbe stood firm. One person insisted, saying, "I have never skipped a daily mikvah since my bar mitzvah", to which the rebbe responded, "God doesn't work for the Guinness World Record."

== Published works ==
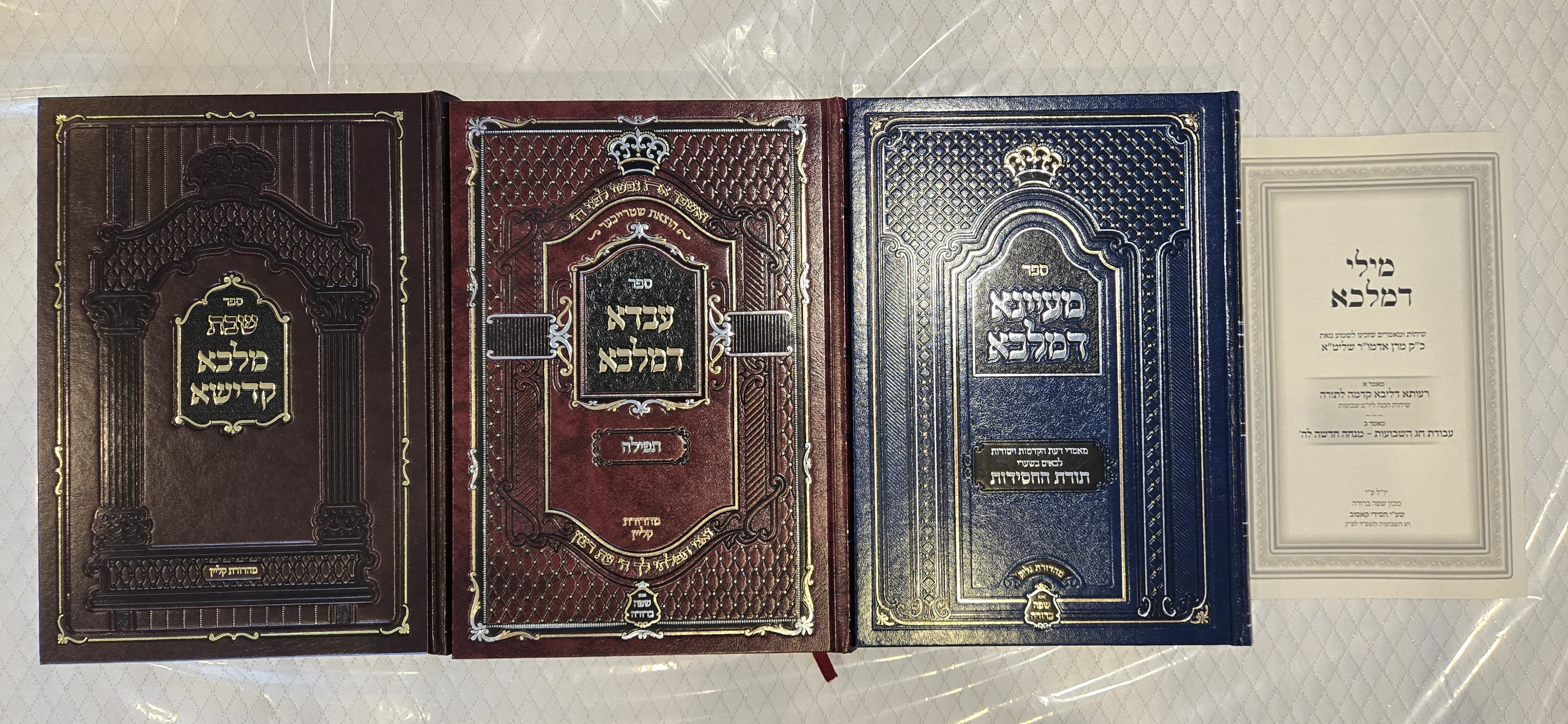

- Shabbos Malka Kadisha, a 2 volume set in Hebrew on the topic of the Shabbat.
- Avdah D'Malka - Teffilah, a 2 volume set in hebrew on the topic of prayer.
- Mayana D'Malka, a book in Hebrew on the basics of Chasidic teachings composed of his lessons on this topic. In other words, Chasidic teachings for beginners. Unlike the other books, this was published by the Chasidim without formally naming him as the author.

In addition to those hard-cover books, his lectures are published weekly in stencils and booklets by Mechon Sufu Beriru. A vast library of audio files are available in Yiddish on various phone hotlines. Some of his weekly teachings were done in English, as well.

== Shtiebels Around The World ==
- Borough Park, Brooklyn: There is the current shul that is under construction, next to the temporary building where Rabbi Hager currently leads. The old shtiebel of his father currently referred to as Zalishchik, where the minyan is led by his younger brother, Rabbi Chaim Hager.
- Williamsburg, Brooklyn: The shtiebel is currently in the Klausenburg cheder and is led by the Rebbe's son, Rabbi Moshe Hager, son-in-law of the Galanta Rebbe.
- Lakewood, New Jersey: The shtiebel is located in a basement and is led by the Rebbe's son, Rabbi Burach Hager. They recently bought a property to build a more permanent Bais Hamedresh.
- Jerusalem: The shtiebel is led by the Rebbe's son, Rabbi Mendel David Hager, son-in-law of Seret Viznitz Rebbe.

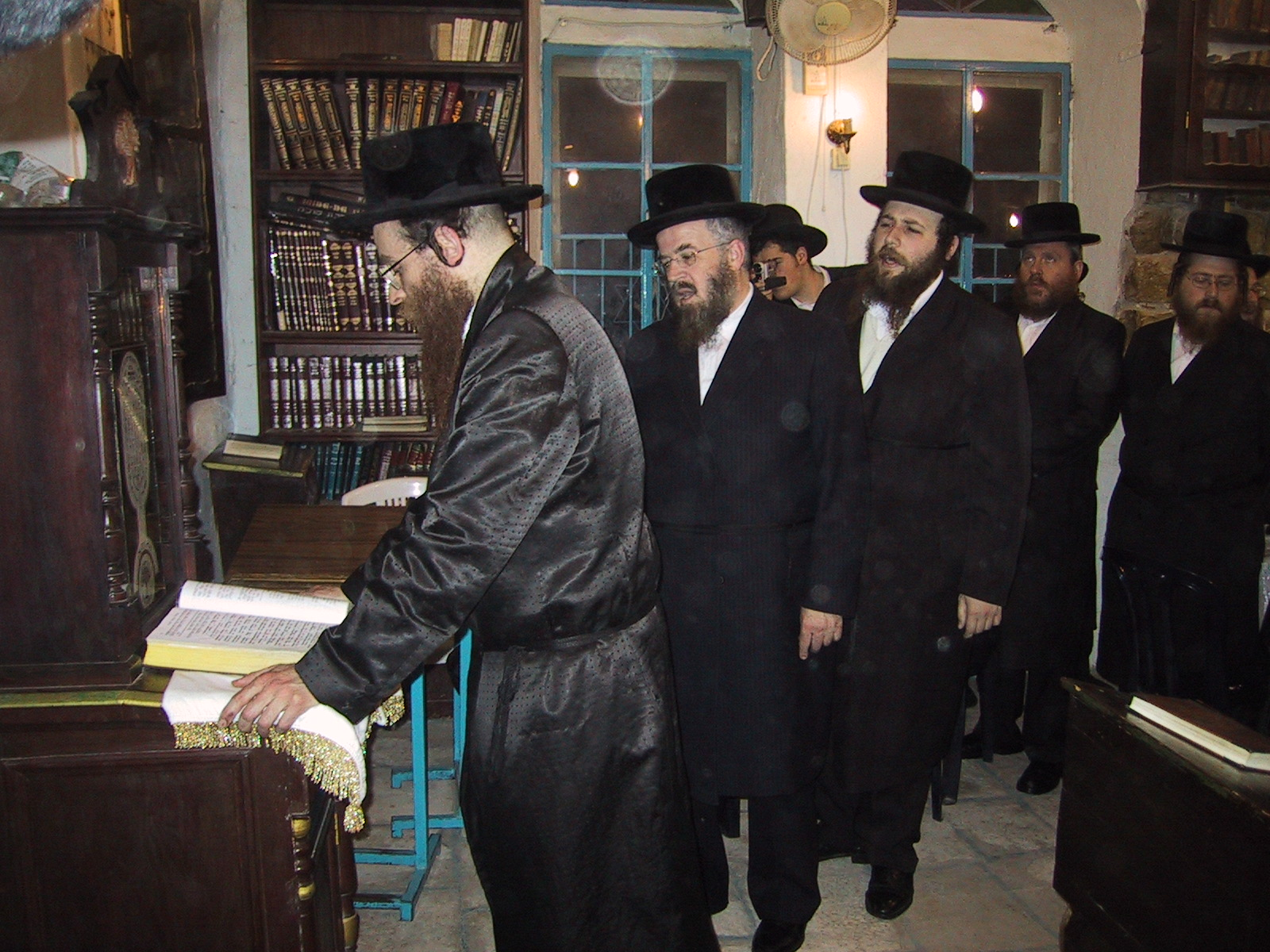
Kosov Rebbe, Rabbi Shraga Feivish Hager, visiting the 200 year old Kosov shul with his followers in Safed, Israel in 2003.

- Safed: There is a historic shul in the old city of Tzfat that was founded by Kosov in 1847. After WWII, it became more of a local neighborhood shul. Rabbi Hager feels a special connection to the shul and regularly sends financial support for its upkeep. In 2003, the then relatively new Kosov Rebbe visited the shul with an entourage of his followers.

== Death and funeral ==
In January 2023, several orthodox Jewish news outlets reported that Hager was ill and requested prayers for his recovery. He died on June 29, 2024.
