= Meinl (surname) =

Meinl is a surname. Notable people with the surname include:

- Gerhard A. Meinl (1957–2026), German instrument maker and politician
- Julius Meinl I (1824–1914), Austrian businessman
- Julius Meinl V (born 1959), British businessman, great-great-grandson of Julius Meinl I
- Roland Meinl, founder of Meinl Percussion
- Beate Meinl-Reisinger (born 1978), Austrian politician
