= Yidele Horowitz =

Grand Rabbi Yidele Horowitz (September/03/1897– June 14/1989), popularly known as Reb Yidele, was the Rebbe of Dzikov, who spent his last years in London, England. Although known as a formidable scholar and a man of exceptional character, he shunned the limelight and abhorred any reverence or treatment as a Rebbe.

== Early years ==
Reb Yidele was born in 1905 in Dzików, a shtetl near Tarnobrzeg, Poland. His mother Chava was the daughter of Rabbi Yisrael Hager, Rebbe of Vizhnitz, and his father was Rabbi Alter Yechezkel Eliyahu.

He studied for five years under Rabbi Meir Arik of Tarnów, who greatly admired him. "No one can compare with him in Galicia", he said. Rabbi Horowitz was brought up in the house of his maternal grandfather, and in 1928 he married his cousin Chana Miriam Sima, the daughter of Rabbi Chaim Meir Hager of Vizhnitz. After ten childless years of marriage he divorced her, but they subsequently remarried and once again divorced. She then married Rabbi Yitzchak Yaakov Weiss.

Rabbi Horowitz was given Semicha by Rabbi Meir Arik, Rabbi Chaim Elazar Shapiro of Munkacz, and by his uncle Rabbi Chaim.

Rabbi Horowitz was a great admirer of the Chasam Sofer, whose seven-volume responsa of that name he knew almost by heart, as well as his sermons and Talmudic novellae. He encouraged Rabbi Yosef Naftali Stern of Romania to publish these works, even giving up his dowry for this purpose.

At the age of 30, Rabbi Horowitz was appointed Dayan in Klausenberg. At the outbreak of World War II in 1939, he was in the spa town of Krynica. He returned to the Dzikov ghetto and then to Kraków. He subsequently lived in Arad, Bucharest and Klausenberg, and miraculously survived the Holocaust. Indeed, Rabbi Horowitz's father died in 1943 in Kraków-Płaszów; Rabbi Yidele was his only surviving son.

== Post World War II ==
In 1947, Rabbi Horowitz settled in Mandatory Palestine, first in Tel Aviv where he was befriended by the Chazon Ish, and then in Jerusalem, where he came to be highly respected by Rabbi Yosef Tzvi Dushinsky, the head of the Edah HaChareidis.

Rabbi Horowitz's uncle, Rabbi Eliezer Hager, urged him to become a Rebbe and continue the traditions of Dzikov. The former, however, was adamant in refusing to allow people to treat him as a Rebbe, though he acted for a time as principal of the Kollel Tarbitza in Jerusalem. Indeed, Rabbi Yoel Teitelbaum, the Rebbe of Satmar, lamented this fact by saying: "there are so many Rebbes who do not merit [deserve] to be Rebbes, and yet one who is so worthy to be a Rebbe [Rabbi Horowitz] refuses to act as one".

Rabbi Horowitz's discourses lasted three to four hours, and he would concentrate on just a few pages of the Talmudic Tractate Chullin, studying it at great depth.

=== London ===
From 1985, Rabbi Horowitz lived in London at Jessam Avenue, Stamford Hill. He came to London to be treated by Dr. Shlomo Adler of Golders Green. Rabbi Horowitz had come to London in 1983 to be treated by Dr. Adler. Dr. Adler successfully helped him avoid an operation that the Rabbi was told was mandatory in Israel and Rabbi Horowitz was forever grateful. Now that he was ill again he put himself wholly under the doctors care. He hardly ever spoke, nor did he deliver any discourses, but spent his days in study and prayer. However he regularly officiated as a Sandek (the one who holds the baby) at brit milahs and would put Tefillin on Bar Mitzvah boys.

Rabbi Horowitz was an ascetic who lived a very frugal life. He would eat meat only on Shabbos, and during the week he never ate bread. In honour of Shabbos he himself would wash some of his clothes. In addition, absolutely all the monies forwarded to him by admirers and Chassidim were immediately distributed to orphans and widows. Rabbi Horowitz was greatly concerned for the material well-being of the underprivileged.

=== Death ===
Rabbi Horowitz died at the age of 84 in 1989, leaving no will or final instructions. After extensive communication and deliberation between relatives in Israel and the United States, he was, on the advice of Rabbi Chanoch Dov Padwa, interred at Enfield Adas Yisroel Cemetery, and not in Jerusalem or at Vizhnitz, Bnei Brak. The elaborate Ohel erected over his grave is frequently visited by all sections of the Chassidic community.

== Works ==
The Rebbe left many unpublished writings, including glosses on the works of Rabbi Moses Sofer, on Toldos Yaakov Yosef by Rabbi Jacob Joseph of Polonne, on the responsa of Rabbi Sholom Mordechai Schwadron and on the works of Rabbi Chaim Yosef David Azulai. His nephews, of Borough Park and Bnei Brak, took possession of his printed Hebrew books and original manuscripts.
