= Meindl =

Meindl may refer to:

- Meindl (company)
- Meindl (surname)

== See also ==
- Meinl (disambiguation)
- Meinel (surname)
