= Yaakov Koppel Hager =

Hasidic rebbe (d. 1787)

Rabbi Ya'akov Koppel Hager יעקב קופיל חסיד

Personal life
- Born: Kolomyia, Austria-Hungary
- Died: 29 August 1787 Tysmenytsia, Polish–Lithuanian Commonwealth
- Spouse: Chaya
- Parent: Nehemiah Feivel (father)
- Dynasty: Kosov

Religious life
- Religion: Judaism

Jewish leader
- Yahrtzeit: 15 Elul
- Dynasty: Kosov

Rabbi Yaakov Koppel Hager (Hebrew: יעקב קופיל חסיד; died 29 August 1787) was a Hasidic rabbi and disciple of the Baal Shem Tov. He was the father of the founder of the Kosov dynasty.

== Biography ==
Hager was born in Kolomyia (modern-day Ukraine) to Nehemiah Feivel Koppel, a merchant. Feivel was the son of Rabbi Yaakov Koppel Kamiel, an expellee of Schnaittach, Germany, and Pearl (who might have actually been his grandmother), a relative of Yom-Tov Lipmann Heller. After marrying, he adopted the surname Hager for unknown reasons.

He married Chaya (died 16 May 1772). She was the daughter of his paternal uncle Zalman, son-in-law of David HaLevi Segal.

During his career, Hager didn't lead a congregation, nor did her serve on a rabbinate board, but made his living from a small resale store. He was not known as a titled tzaddik among his circle, but it is believed that the Besht saw him as a hidden tzaddik. He approached the path of Hasidism, and met the Baal Shem Tov, who he became a disciple of, and later became a public messenger of his. According to Hasidic oral tradition, the Besht promised Hassid that the Jewish community of Maramureș would be under the rabbinate of his descendants.

He was called a "Shvitinik" by the gentile population of his town due to the way that he held his hands over his eyes occasionally, even when trading, and would read the verse "Shivviti ADONAI lenegdi tamid ki mimini bal-emmot". (Psalms 16:8)

In his final years, he lived in Tysmenytsia, where he helped grow the Hasidic movement in the area and defended Rabbi Meshullam Egra following a dispute that arose between him and the residents of the city.

== Family ==
Hassid had 3 children:

- Rabbi Yitzchak of Kolmiya
- Rebbetzin Bluma, the wife of Rabbi Yitzhak of Vyzhnytsia and later married to the widow of Rabbi Uri of Strelisk
- Rabbi Menachem Mendel Hager of Kosov, the first Rabbi of the Kosov dynasty
