= Yisrael Friedman (Pashkaner Rebbe) =

Romanian-Israeli rabbi, historian, and Rosh Yeshiva (1923–2017)

- ישראל פרידמן
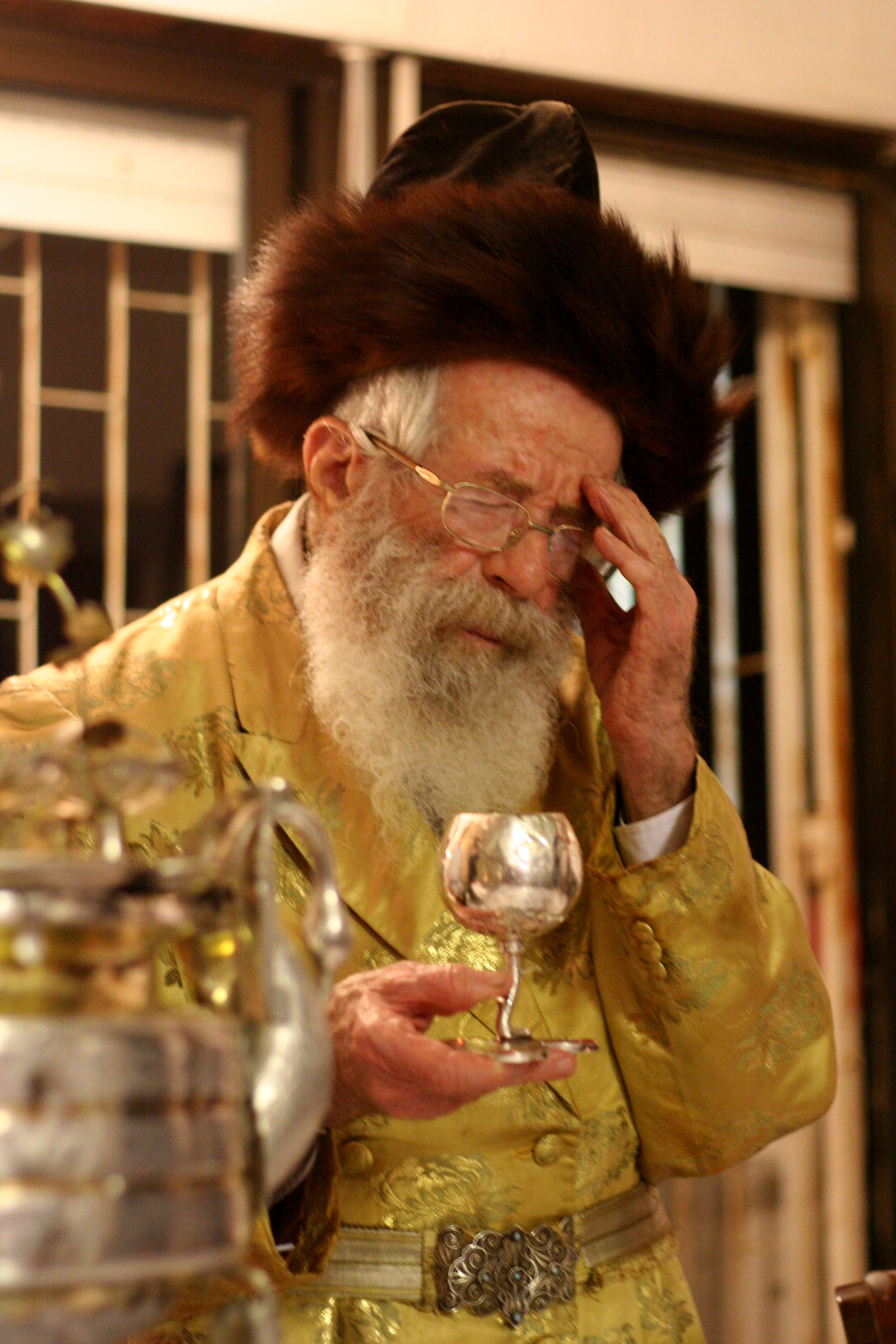

Personal life
- Born: November 8, 1923 Buhuși
- Died: May 1, 2017 (aged 93)
- Spouse: Tziporah
- Children: Hoshea Friedman, Shmuel Ben-Shalom, several others
- Dynasty: Pashkan

Religious life
- Religion: Judaism

Jewish leader
- Yahrtzeit: 5 Iyar, 5777
- Dynasty: Pashkan

Yisrael Friedman (Hebrew: ישראל פרידמן בן-שלום; November 8, 1923 – May 1, 2017), also known as the "Pashkaner Rebbe", was a historian, Rabbi, and Rosh Yeshiva. "Ben-Shalom", a man of peace, was appended to the surname in reference to his forebear Sholom Shachne of Prohobisht.

Friedman was born in Buhuși, Romania, a sixth-generation descendant of Rebbe Yisrael of Rizhin. He studied Torah under both of his grandfathers, Menachem Mendel of Bohush and Moshe Yehudah Leib of Pashkan. He received a secular education locally. He was involved with Hashomer Hatzair as a youth leader.

The family moved to Bucharest during the Second World War. There, he married Tzipora Hager, daughter of the Vizhnitz Rebbe Chaim Meir Hager (the Imrei Chaim). The couple made Aliyah to Israel in 1946, becoming founders of Kibbutz Reshafim. He served in the 1948 War of Independence, active against Iraqi forces. Thereafter, he and Tzipora lived on several Kibbutzim, including in secretarial and educational roles, and were on shlichut for the Sochnut to France in the 1960s.

In his 40s he pursued an academic education, receiving a Doctorate in Jewish Studies from Tel Aviv University in 1981. He was a lecturer in Jewish history at Tel Aviv University, and then Ben-Gurion University of the Negev and Sapir Academic College.

In 2000, he left academia. Along with his son Shmuel Ben-Shalom he founded Ahavat Yisrael, a Hesder Yeshiva in Netivot, and served as joint Rosh Yeshiva. He was known as the "Pashkaner Rebbe" after the city of Pașcani where his grandfather was Rebbe; his successor as Rebbe is his son, Rabbi Hoshea Friedman-Ben Shalom, a brigadier general in the IDF.

Rabbi Friedman died at the age of 93, leaving his wife Rebbetzin Tziporah, four sons and one daughter. He resided in the southern Jerusalem neighborhood of Gilo.
