= Hoshea Friedman =

Hasidic Rabbi and IDF General

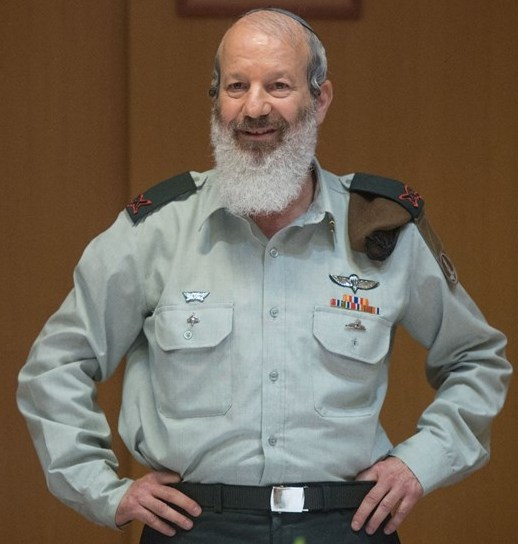
Hoshea Friedman-Ben Shalom

Hoshea Friedman-Ben Shalom (Hebrew: הושע פרידמן-בן שלום; born 1959) is a brigadier general in the IDF and the current Pashkaner Rebbe.

== Biography ==
Hoshea Friedman-Ben Shalom was born in Reshafim, a kibbutz in northeastern Israel. When he was 3 years old, his family moved to Sa'ad, a religious kibbutz in the Negev desert. Friedman-Ben Shalom is the son of Rebbe Yisrael Friedman, the Pashkaner Rebbe (and inherited that title upon his father's passing), and his mother, Tziporah, is the daughter of the Imrei Chaim of Vizhnitz. He is married and has five children.

== Military career ==
Friedman served in the Golani Brigade.

== Honors ==
In 2011 Friedman-Ben Shalom was honored as one of the torchbearers in the national Israeli Independence Day ceremony.
