= Menahem Manus Bendetsohn =

- Born: 1817; Grodno, Russian Empire
- Died: March 20, 1888 (aged 70–71); Grodno, Russian Empire
- Writing career
- Language: Hebrew
- Movement: Haskalah

Menahem Manus Bendetsohn (Yiddish: מנחם מאנוש בענדעטסזאהן, romanized: Menaḥem Manush Bendeṭszohn; 1817 – March 20, 1888) was a Russian educator and Hebrew writer.

== Biography ==
Bendetsohn was born in Grodno in 1817. After receiving a Talmudic education in his hometown, he was sent to Breslau, Germany. There he was supported by his father-in-law, Reuben Liebling, who served as the cantor of the Reform synagogue.

In 1853, he returned to Russia and went on to teach for over two decades at the government school for Jewish children in Grodno, and for a short time in Volkovisk. He also ran a private school in Grodno for many years. Among his notable pupils were the Hebrew poet Constantin Shapiro, the lawyer L. Kupernik, and the jurist and writer D. Slonimski.

In addition to his proficiency in Hebrew, Bendetsohn was skilled in writing both Russian and German. His exceptional memory allowed him to learn the Scriptures by heart as well as German classics such as Schiller.

As a writer with a strong sense of aesthetics and style, he expressed disapproval of the German-influenced Hebrew used by the younger generation of Maskilim, and severely criticized it in his preface to Alluf Ne'urim. This sparked a response from R. A. Braudes in an article titled Ha-safah bikhevodah ube-'otsmah.

== Publications ==
- Ha-musar, o aḥarit rashaʻ (in Hebrew). 1846. A Hebrew retelling of a Polish tale, adapted from Wolf Tugendhold's Der Denunziant ('The Denunciator').
- Even boḥan (in Hebrew). Vilna. 1856. The principal rules of Hebrew grammar in the form of questions and answers.
- Higayon le-ʻitim [Timely Thoughts] (in Hebrew). Vol. 1–2. Vilna: Romm. 1856–1862. A Hebrew adaptation of Samson Wolf Rosenfeld's Stunden der Andacht für Israeliten.
- Moda' le-yalde Israel [Friend of Jewish Children] (in Hebrew and Russian). Warsaw. 1872. A compilation of instructive tales and anecdotes from the lives of noteworthy individuals, partly drawn from Wilhelm Oertel's Practischer Unterricht in der Deutschen Sprache.
- Alluf ne'urim (in Hebrew). Vilna: Y. L. Lipman. 1879. A collection of educational tales for young readers, and an introductory guide to the Hebrew language.
