= Menachem Mendel Hager of Kosov =

Hasidic rebbe (1768–1825)

Rabbi Menachem Mendel Hager of Kosov
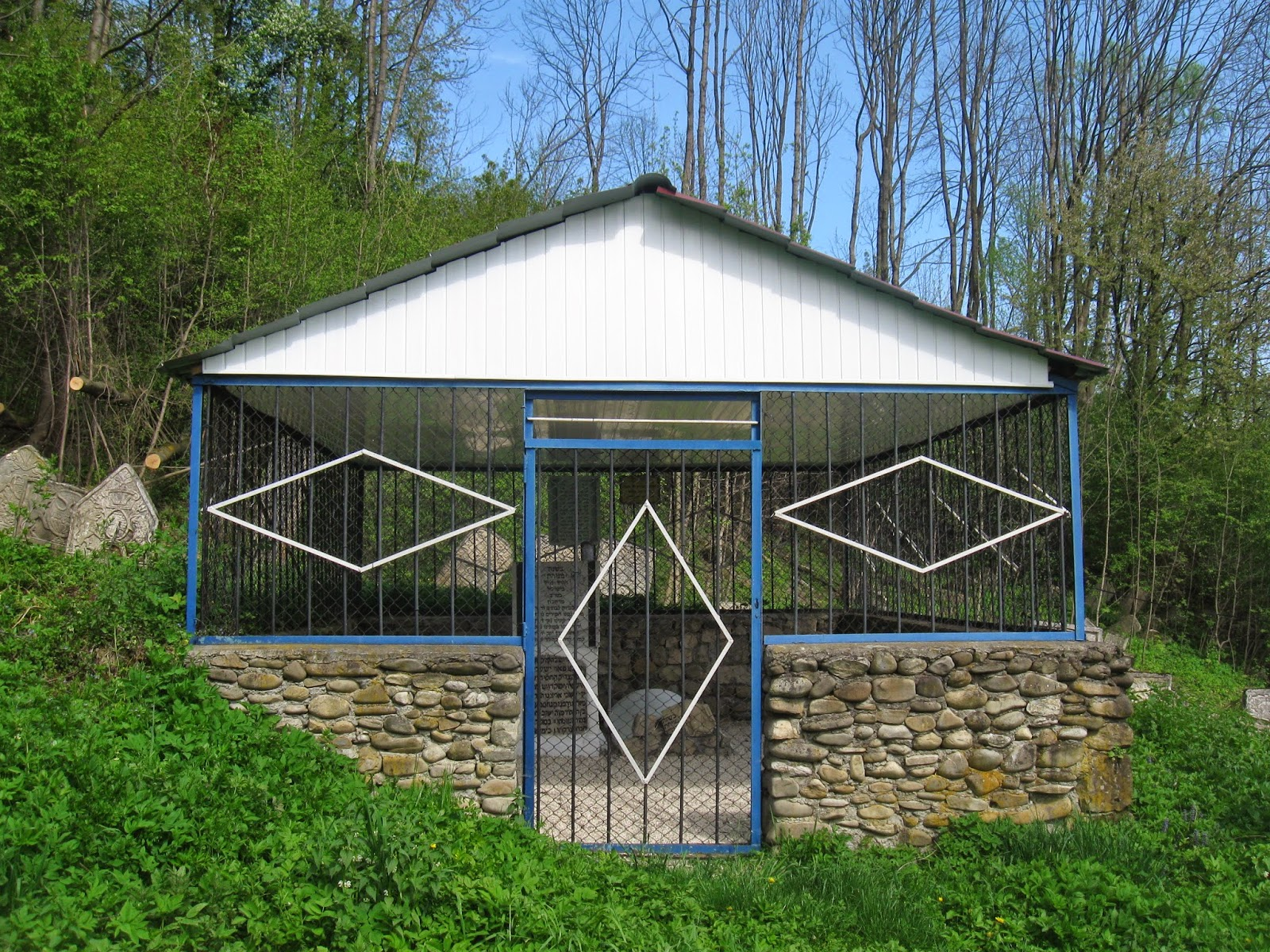
- The Ohel on Hager's grave

Personal life
- Born: 1768 Kolomyia, Polish–Lithuanian Commonwealth
- Died: 29 October 1825 (aged 56–57) Kosiv, Habsburg monarchy
- Spouse: Shaina Rachel
- Children: Chaim Hager, David Hager of Zablotov, Sarah Leah
- Parents: Yaakov Koppel Hager (father); Chaya (mother)
- Dynasty: Kosov

Religious life
- Religion: Judaism

Jewish leader
- Successor: Chaim Hager
- Yahrtzeit: 17 Cheshvan
- Dynasty: Kosov

Rabbi Menachem Mendel Hager of Kosov (Hebrew: מנחם מנדל הגר), nicknamed the "Ahavat Shalom", (1768–29 October 1825) was a Hasidic rebbe and founder of the Kosov dynasty, which he led from 1802 until his death in 1825. He is well-known for his book, The Love of Peace.

== Biography ==
Hager was born in Kolomyia (modern-day Ukraine) to Rabbi Yaakov Koppel Hager and his wife Chaya. He studied under Rabbi Moshe Leib of Sasov, Rabbi Ze'ev Wolf of Cherni-Ostra'ah, Rabbi Meshullam Feivush Heller, and Rabbi Zvi Hirsh of Nadvoma.

From an early age, he devoted most of his life to Torah study and only engaged in commerce enough to earn a living for basic necessities. He accepted the position of rabbinate in Kosov and became the mentor to thousands of Hasidim. He, along with his wife Rebbetzin Shaina Rachel, was the first member of the Kosov Hasidic of the Hager family, of which came the subgroups of Vizhnitz Hasidism, Saaret Vizhnitz Hasidism, and others.

Becoming popular among Hasidim, Rabbi Simcha Bunim of Peshischa said that his feet burned to want to meet the rebbe of Kosov. The Seer of Lublin referred to him as a "king".

After the death of his wife, Rabbi Moshe Leib of Sasov sent two children, a boy and a girl, to Hager, his former student, to take care of their upbringing and education. Moshe died about three months later.

Among Hager's students were:

- Rabbi Eliezer Ze'ev Marilus of Bucecea
- Rabbi Shmuel of Shinawa
- Rabbi Menachem Mendel Stern

He died on 29 October 1825.

== Family ==
Among his children are:

- Rabbi Chaim Hager, who succeeded him as rebbe of Kosov
- Rabbi David Hager of Zablotov, who married Pessia Leah, the daughter of Moshe of Sasov who came to live in his household
- Rebbetzin Sarah Leah, wife of Rabbi Yechiel Michal Mazal, son of Yisrael Avraham Mazal and later Rabbi Gershon Ashkenazi of Kolomyia
