= Menahem Rabinovich =

- מנחם רבינוביץ
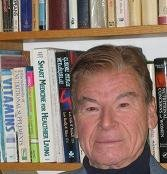
- Born: 11 September 1934; Israel
- Died: 28 June 2012; Israel
- Citizenship: Israeli
- Education: Hebrew University, Penn State University
- Occupation: Biochemist
- Scientific career
- Fields: Molecular Biology Nutrition and Health

Menny (Menahem) Rabinovich (Hebrew: מנחם (מני) רבינוביץ; September 11, 1934 – June 28, 2012) was a multi-disciplinary Israeli biochemist with expertise in nutrition, health and medicinal plants. Rabinovich was a researcher at Hadassah Medical Center in Jerusalem. He was the founder and director of the Wise Nutrition Center and the developer of the dietary supplement Curcumall. He researched in the fields of molecular biology, science education and integrative medicine focusing on nutrition and health. He served as a member of the scientific committee of the Hebrew Encyclopedia editor and writer of articles in biochemistry, geology, chemistry and medicine.

== Biography ==
Menny (Menahem) Rabinovich was born in Jerusalem, Israel, to Miriam and Dr. Elchanan Rabinovich, who was Head of the Pediatrics department at the Hadassah Medical Center, and Chairman of Israeli Medical Association. He acquired his academic education in Israel and in the United States. He received his undergraduate degree in Chemistry and Biochemistry from the Hebrew University of Jerusalem, M.Sc. degree in Microbiology at and his graduate degrees in molecular genetics from the Medical School of Hadassah and Hebrew University. In 1973 he was granted a UNESCO fellowship to pursue his studies in the U.S. and Canada in integrating multimedia in science teaching. In 1975 he received an invitation to serve as a lecturer in science education at the Pennsylvania State University in Pennsylvania, USA as well as a PhD scholarship in science teaching. He graduated his PhD from Penn State in 1980. During 1981-1989 he further pursued his studies in nutrition and health with an emphasis on the usage of vitamins and supplements in preventive medicine. While engaged in research and teaching at Penn State he was actively involved in establishing the Jewish Studies program at Penn State. Dr. Rabinovich devoted the last thirty years of his life to integrative medicine and founded and directed The Center for Wise Nutrition in Israel.

During the last decade of his life Dr. Rabinovich developed the dietary supplement Curcumall, a concentrated liquid extract of turmeric (Curcuma longa) and curcumin.

His wife Aviva is a scientist who assisted him in his scientific work.

== Hebrew encyclopedia entries ==
During 1967-1975 he was a member of the scientific board of the Encyclopedia Hebraica and served as editor and writer of articles on chemistry, biochemistry, geology, and medicine, in seven volumes of the Encyclopedia Hebraica.

== Research and Teaching ==
During his undergraduate studies he worked at the National Laboratory of Physics under the direction of Zvi Tabor on solar energy research focusing on the development of the selective coating of solar panels. At Hadassah Medical Center, during his graduate studies, he researched molecular genetics mechanisms focusing on the mechanism of transcription of messenger RNA (m-RNA) as a template for protein synthesis. At the Medical school he was teaching Microbiology to medical students and started in integrating media in science teaching. This brought him to get actively involved in the Science Teaching Center of the Hebrew University in Jerusalem, as well as writing and producing science films and instructional TV programs. In the frame of the Educational TV in Israel, he has written scripts and served as presenter for a series of programs in genetics for high school. "The Design and Evaluation of a Theoretical Model for Knowledge Dissemination and its application to the development and implementation of a computerized system for statewide instructional dissemination", was the topic of his Ph.D. at The Pennsylvania State university (1980). During his studies he was invited to give presentations knowledge dissemination in a number of conferences on science teaching and media. At Penn State he was also active in establishing the Judaic Studies program.

== Zionist activism ==
During his studies in the U.S. he was a lecturer and public speaker on Israeli issues for the UJA and the Bonds. He wrote and published newspaper articles on Israel and the US in Jewish newspapers in New York. He was actively involved in promoting Israeli issues on US campuses and at Penn State he established and directed a non-religious, pro-Israeli student organization called Yachad which received support from the Israeli government. He also established and directed at Penn State a student exchange summer program of Penn State students at Tel-Aviv University.

== Wise Nutrition Center ==
In the last two decades of his life he founded and directed in Israel the Wise Nutrition Center. The center offered lectures, workshops and courses as well as private consultation on health and nutrition.

== Product Development ==
Rabinovich developed a number of dietary supplements, including a zero-cholesterol egg yolk replacer, a natural hair color developer, and a liquid extract of turmeric and curcumin.
