= Julius Meinl V =

British businessman (born 1959)

- Born: 9 July 1959 (age 67); Vienna, Austria
- Occupations: Businessman, banker

Julius Meinl V (born 9 July 1959) is a British businessman, resident in Prague, Czech Republic (since the end of August 2013). He heads a substantial family business originally built on producing and retailing food products, founded by his great-great-grandfather, Julius Meinl I, in Vienna in 1862.

== Early life ==
Julius Meinl V was born in Vienna, Austria, to a wealthy family. To prepare him to join the family business, he was educated at the Ecole des Hautes Etudes Economiques, Juridiques et Sociales, St Gallen, one of the world's leading business schools. He then gained experience in London with Swiss Bank Corporation and later in the United States with Brown Brothers Harriman, America's oldest and largest private bank. As a boy, Meinl V went to school in Austria, before finishing a degree in banking in Switzerland at the University of St. Gallen.

== Family (and family business) history ==
The Julius Meinl name is synonymous with the family business, and the brand is one of Austria's most well-known and prestigious. The family fortunes were built initially upon the manufacture and sale of quality ground coffee. From this beginning, the company grew steadily and successfully, retailing an increasingly wide variety of foods. Over time it became the upmarket grocery multiple, with outlets throughout Austria and in many other Central and Eastern European countries. It also became one of Austria's largest companies.

In 1938, Meinl V's grandfather Julius Meinl III (1903–1991) was forced to leave Austria along with his Jewish wife and their son Meinl IV, while the rest of the Meinl family remained in Austria. Meinl V's mother's family also fled Austria, just managing to escape in 1940. Meinl III took his family to Britain. For this "act of treachery," the German government revoked the citizenship of the Meinl family, denouncing them as "enemies of the Reich". The Meinl family became naturalised British citizens in 1946.

During the course of World War II, Meinl III was in close contact with the authorities in Britain, providing advice and assistance on the manner in which the Nazi Party had extended its influence on Central Europe through the infiltration of the management of large retail organisations. After the war, Meinl III assisted the Central Commission for Germany and Austria in the process of denazification of Austria. Meinl's contribution involved the identification of significant Nazi sympathisers who were occupying positions of authority in Austria and who had remained undetected. This work added to the growing number of people in Austria who disliked the name Meinl.

Nevertheless, the family returned to Austria to rebuild the family business, which they did with considerable success, expanding its retail operations throughout central Europe. It also ventured into banking, building a simple savings business into a small private bank.

== Career ==
After graduating from university in banking, he spent two years in London with Swiss Bank Corporation and another two years in New York at Brown Brothers Harriman, America's oldest and largest private bank.

In 1983, at the age of 24, Meinl V assumed the reins of the Meinl Bank. In the early 1990s, Julius Meinl AG reestablished food-retail operations in Hungary, the Czech Republic, and Poland, where it had historically already been present. In 1998/99, the company implemented the divestiture of the food-retailing assets of Julius Meinl AG in Austria and Hungary, following which the group's activities became focused primarily on banking and finance operations. At this time, Meinl Bank expanded its activities to include private and institutional asset management, private banking, and fund management. Meinl Bank became one of the leading Austrian private merchant and investment banks. In 2000, a subsidiary named Meinl Capital Markets was opened in London to provide broking services specialising in hedge funds and exchange traded funds. However, the firm closed this operation in 2001. Also in 2001, the subsidiary Meinl Capital Advisors AG was founded to provide corporate finance and investment banking advisory services to governments and private clients.

In 1998, the company launched a Central European and Eastern European real estate business. It was introduced on the Vienna Stock Exchange in 2002 as Meinl European Land. In 2007, Meinl Airports International and Meinl International Power, specialised airport and energy investment funds, were additionally listed on the Vienna Stock Exchange. The Group's main area of activity is Central and Eastern Europe. Meinl V was not a director of any of the three funds

From 2014 to 2017 Julius Meinl was President of the Euro-Asian Jewish Congress, a sub-organization of the World Jewish Congress in Jerusalem. In October 2017 Julius Meinl was appointed World Jewish Congress' Commissioner for Combating Antisemitism.

In June 2019, Julius Meinl V resigned as chairman of the supervisory board, and the bank changed its name to Anglo Austrian AAB Bank.

== Legal matters ==
In 2008, Austria commenced an investigation into the collapse in value of shares in Meinl European Land Limited. That same year, a parallel investigation began in Jersey, in the Channel Islands, where Meinl European Land is a Jersey company. On 1 April 2009, a judge ordered Meinl V to be arrested following an interrogation by Vienna prosecutors. Meinl, who was then suspected of involvement in yet-to-be-defined wrongdoing, was required to post bail of 100 million euros because the judge considered him a flight risk due to his holding a British passport. Meinl remains uncharged with any offence.

In February 2012, the Jersey Financial Services Commission announced that it had closed its investigation into the affairs of Meinl European Land, having found no evidence of wrongdoing.

Following a decision of the Higher Regional Court of Vienna, most of the record deposit – 90 million euros – was refunded in March 2013. From the perspective of Meinl Bank, the only logical conclusion after this step is to close the criminal proceedings against Meinl. . The previous investigations have lasted for more than five years until now (May 2013) and have still yielded no result. In the course of the proceedings, documents were seized by means of police raids, and according to an article in the daily newspaper Die Presse those documents are an absolute mess that was allegedly inflicted by a surveyor.

On December 31, 2014, Meinl and four other Meinl Bank employees were charged with dishonesty in relation to a 212 million euro dividend paid out by his private bank. All five defendants, including Julius Meinl, have raised objections to the indictment in due time. In these objections the defendants pointed out that they behaved lawfully and strongly criticized the state prosecutor of Vienna as well as the indictment. As announced on April 17, 2015, the Vienna Higher Regional Court (OLG Wien) upheld the oppositions and rejected the charges against Julius Meinl and other defendants.

On May 14, 2024, the Vienna Public Prosecutor's Office announced that it had discontinued all criminal proceedings against Julius Meinl V and a number of other individuals that arose from the investigations begun in 2008, 16 years previously.

The announcement by the Vienna Public Prosecutor's Office was supported by a comprehensive report that fully exonerated Julius Meinl V and the other individuals. The announcement also confirmed that all lines of enquiry in connection with Meinl European Land had been concluded and that no further proceedings were pending. In light of the statement by the Vienna Public Prosecutor's office, there were no continuing criminal proceedings in relation to Meinl European Land in Austria or in any other country.

=== Personal life ===
Julius Meinl V has been married to Ariane Meinl since 2012 and has a son from a previous marriage.
