= Murder of Menachem Stark =

2014 killing in Great Neck, New York, US

Menachem Stark
- Born: July 15, 1974
- Died: January 3, 2014 (aged 39)
- Cause of death: Murder by asphyxiation
- Occupations: Real estate developer, businessman, philanthropist
- Children: 7

Menachem "Max" Stark (July 15, 1974 – January 3, 2014) was an American real estate developer whose badly burned body was found smoldering in a dumpster outside a gas station in Great Neck, New York.

The cousins Erskine Felix, Kendel Felix, Kendall Felix, and Irvine Henry were arrested and eventually convicted of the crime. Erskine worked for Stark, a prominent member of the Satmar Hasidic community in the Williamsburg neighborhood of New York City. Claiming that Stark owed him money, Erskine recruited his cousins to help in a botched robbery of Stark that instead turned into a homicide.

The New York Post featured a front page image of Stark with the headline, "Who Didn't Want Him Dead?". The headline, referring to the notion that Stark had acquired a number of enemies during the course of his real estate dealings, sparked condemnation from local officials for showing insensitivity towards the victim, and for seeming to condone crime.

== Background ==
Menachem Stark was a prominent member of the Satmar Hasidic community of Williamsburg, a neighborhood of New York City. He was a real estate developer.

Public records showed that Stark and his business partner, Israel Perlmutter, had some business troubles, dating back to the 2007–2009 recession, including a $29 million loan default resulting in a 2009 bankruptcy and a lawsuit in 2011, and an unrelated $2.9 million loan default that led to a $4 million judgement in 2012. The media also reported on a long list of building violations in properties owned by Stark and his partners. Tenants had described revolting conditions in Stark-owned residential buildings for many years, although shortly after Stark's death, glowing reviews of his properties began to appear on social media sites.

Among Stark and Perlmutter's creditors was the Broadway Bank of Chicago, notable for its loans to organized crime figures, such as convicted bookmaker Michael "Jaws" Giorango. Stark and Perlmutter defaulted on a $1.5 million loan from the bank, part of the $104 million in loan defaults that contributed to the bank's demise.

Bank accounts belonging to Southside LLC (Stark and Perlmutter's corporation) appear to have been tampered with to conceal a diversion of funds. According to court filings, $3.6 million was found to be missing from accounts maintained by Southside LLC. Unauthorized withdrawals had been made in the second half of 2013.

Jonathan Flaxer, a trustee appointed by the bankruptcy court to oversee the Southside LLC case, said that Stark had "obtained cashier's checks made out to a multitude of individuals, entities, and law firms to pay for personal debts or for use in other real estate transactions". According to the Daily News, the checks were marked "customer withdrawal". The Daily News said that court records show that, in the month before Stark was murdered, five "customer withdrawals" were taken out from the account, totaling $267,101.

According to court records, a rent security account at one of Southside LLC's businesses contained only $3,500, when it should have in excess of $200,000 on deposit. The account contained rents collected from the company's buildings, which the company continued to manage as its bankruptcy was being processed.

Flaxer said he would call Stark's widow and his partner Perlmutter to testify in the case. Perlmutter, via his attorney, said he would use his Fifth Amendment right to avoid self-incrimination if he is questioned about the missing money.

Perlmutter also reportedly told police that the pair owed about $1 million to a loan shark or a Russian businessman.

In the weeks before his death, Stark reportedly ended his conversations with the phrase "Please pray for me". He would ask the person to whom he was speaking to invoke his name and his mother's name, a sign in Orthodox Judaism of someone facing a life-threatening situation.

Stark died without a will.

== Incident ==
Stark exited his office located at 331 Rutledge Street in Williamsburg on January 2, 2014, at around 11:45 pm into a heavy blizzard. A surveillance camera positioned near the office captured images of Stark struggling with two attackers for nearly five minutes, before being forced into a silver Dodge Caravan in an intended robbery. Broken handcuffs and plastic restraining tape were later found on the sidewalk. His badly burned body was found the next day smoldering in a dumpster outside a Getty gas station on Cutter Mill Road in Great Neck, New York.

According to the Nassau County Medical Examiner, Stark died of asphyxia by compression of the neck and chest. He was also badly burned on his torso and hands. When found, he had $4,000 cash in his pocket, and uncashed checks in his name worth another $41,000.

== Arrests ==
Four cousins were arrested in the aftermath of the crime. Erskine Felix lived in nearby Crown Heights and managed construction sites owned by Stark. He had about $20,000 worth of construction work which had not been paid up to that point. His co-conspirators – his brother Kendall Felix, cousin Kendel Felix, and cousin Irvine Henry – worked as carpenters on those construction sites. According to prosecutors, Erskine, claiming Stark owed him the money, plotted to kidnap him and hold him for ransom.

In May 2014, Kendel Felix was indicted on charges of second-degree murder, kidnapping, and attempted robbery in the case. He said that he and two accomplices had kidnapped Stark, hoping to get the money. According to the New York Post, Kendel confessed to the killing and admitted to being the driver of the van, as well as one of the men who wrestled with Stark on the sidewalk.

The Post said that Felix implicated two other men in the murder, but that they had been arrested and then released. According to Felix's alleged confession, one of the accomplices said "He owes me money" just before they grabbed Stark. Felix indicated that the death was unintentional, and occurred after one of Felix's accomplices sat on Stark inside the minivan.

== Convictions ==
Kendall Felix, who admitted to burning Stark's body, was charged with conspiracy and hindering prosecution. He pleaded guilty in 2019 to both counts in exchange for a plea bargain offered by Brooklyn Supreme Court Justice Danny Chun. In March 2019, he was sentenced to 2 1/3–7 years behind bars, over prosecutors’ objections. Felix, who was confronted by Stark's widow, declined to address Chun or Stark's family during his sentencing.

In April 2019, Erskine Felix was convicted of second-degree murder, first degree kidnapping and tampering with physical evidence for masterminding and carrying out the fatal kidnapping. He was acquitted of another first-degree kidnapping charge and a conspiracy charge. Jurors took fewer than five hours of deliberation to convict Felix. In June he was sentenced to 24 years to life.

In May 2019, Kendel Felix was sentenced to 15-years-to-life in prison. He apologized to the victim's family.

== Outrage about New York Post front page ==
The New York Post featured an image of the deceased Stark on the front page of their January 5 edition, with the headline, "Who Didn't Want Him Dead?". The front page sparked outrage, specifically among members of the Orthodox Jewish community, amid suggestions that the Post was helping to create a climate of violence. Brooklyn Borough President Eric Adams, New York Assemblyman Dov Hikind, and other local politicians condemned the coverage at a press conference at Brooklyn Borough Hall, and there were calls for a boycott of the tabloid. The Post refused to apologize, saying that the headline referred only to Stark's "many enemies", and expressed its sympathies to the deceased man's family. Stark left behind a wife and seven children.

Stark was publicly mourned by the Hasidic community. The Jewish Daily Forward noted that, "For his Satmar friends and colleagues, Stark, 38, embodied the best of their world: a generous person with an open wallet for anyone in search of aid." The Forward added that, "Stark appears to have personified a contradiction familiar both inside and outside ultra-Orthodox circles: a pious philanthropist whose business dealings didn't always live up to avowed communal standards."

After his death, the Hasidic fertility charity Bonei Olam dedicated a new Clinical Genetics Fund in his name, "to help couples with genetic issues realize their dreams of parenthood".
