= Kosov (Hasidic dynasty) =

Ukrainian Hasidic dynasty

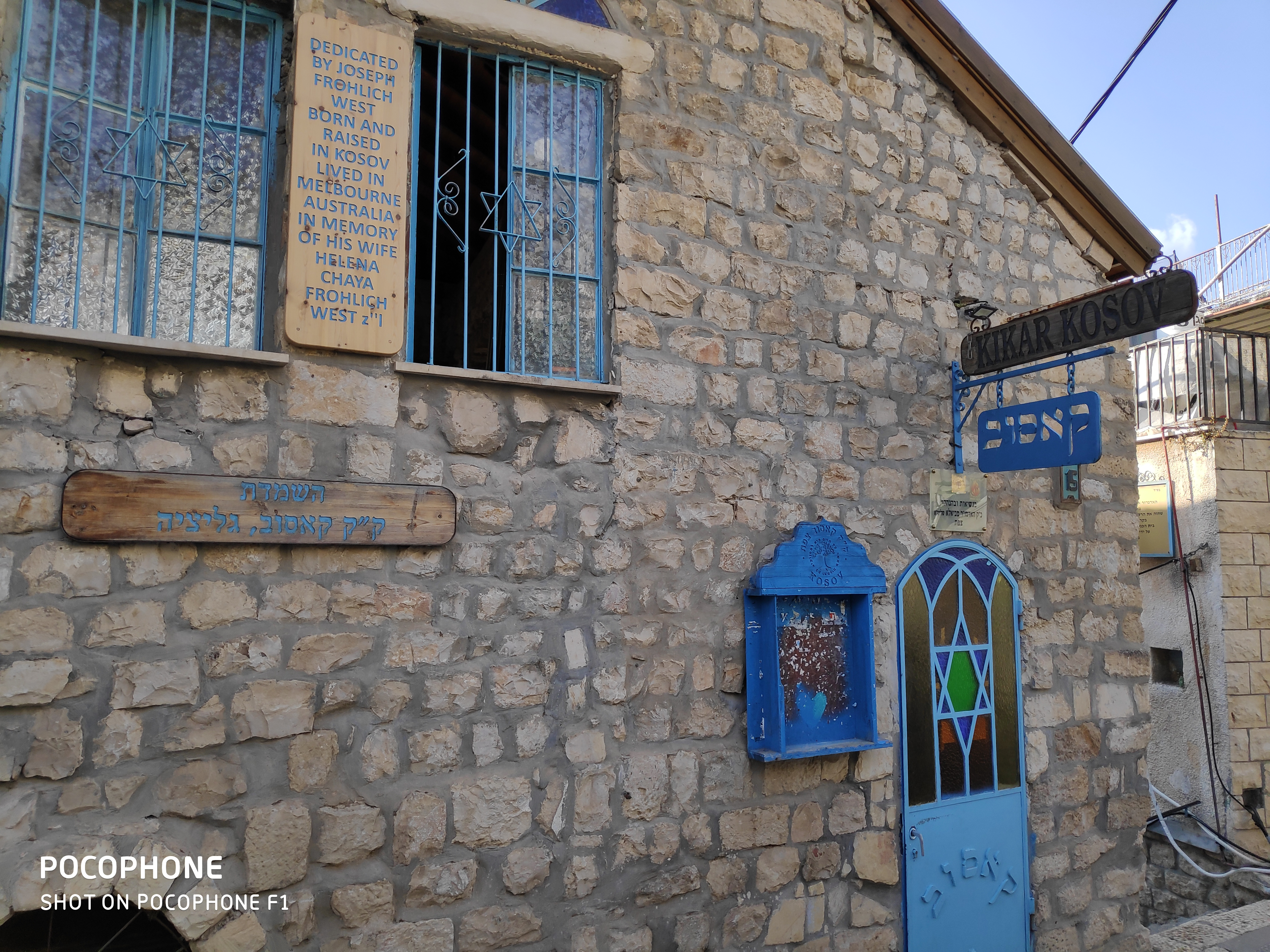
Kosov Synagogue, Tzfat

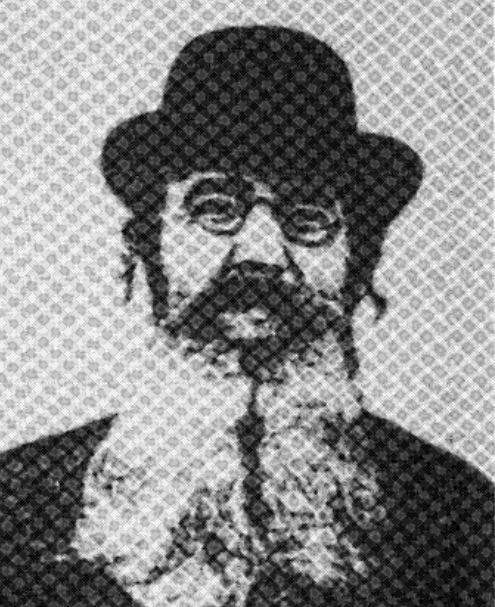
Rabbi Moshe Hager of Kosov

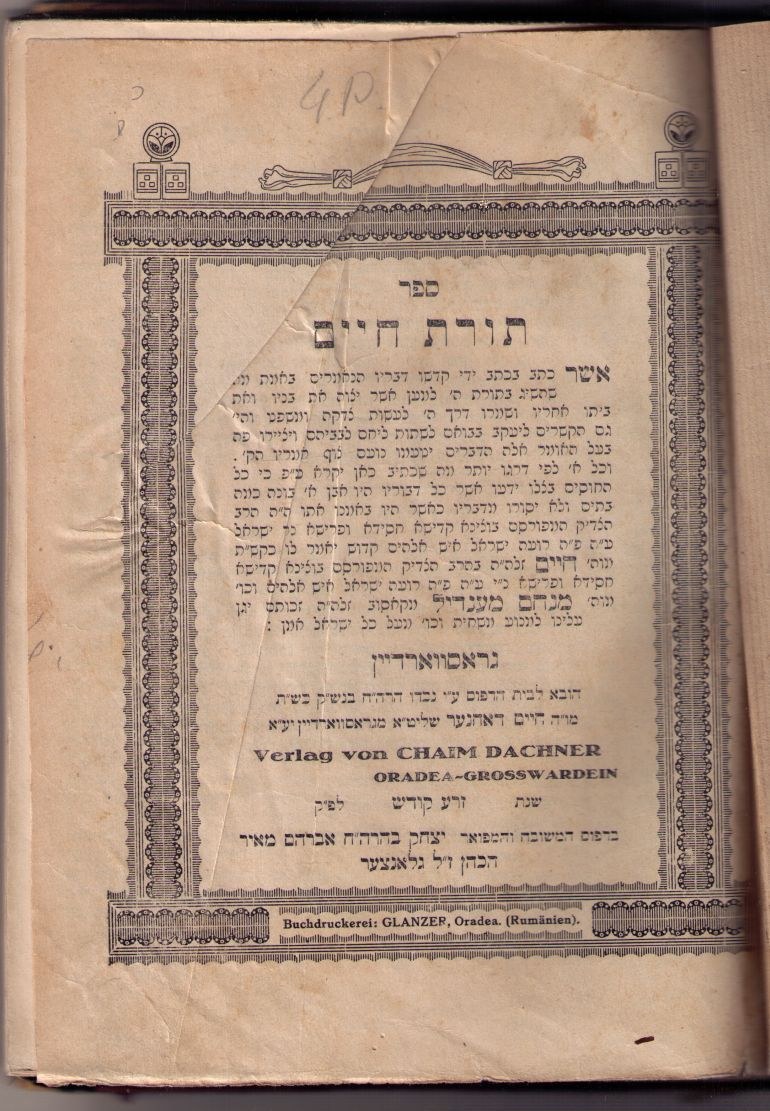
Torat Haim, Oradea, 1927 - Book of Rabbi Chaim of Kossov

Kosov is a Hasidic dynasty founded by Rabbi Menachem Mendel Hager of Kosiv, a town in Galicia, presently in Ukraine.

The Kosov Hasidic dynasty, Rabbi Mendel of Kosov's descendants, founded the many Kosov Hasidic sects. The Vizhnitz dynasty is the best known branch of the original Kosover dynasty. Other branches include Seret.

Among the many contemporary descendants of the Kosov dynasty, two are called "the Kosover Rebbe": Rabbi Shraga Feivish Hager of Borough Park, Brooklyn (died 2024), where he had a substantial following and presided at his tish, and Rabbi Menachem Monderer of Jerusalem (died 2013). There is also a historic Kosover synagogue in Tzfat (Safed), Israel, which, however, is run by followers of the Biala Rebbe of Lugano, Switzerland.

== Dynasty ==
- Grand Rabbi Menachem Mendel Hager of Kosov (1768–1825), author of Ahavas Sholom—son of Rabbi Yaakov Kopl Chosid of Kolomyia, a disciple of the Baal Shem Tov
  - Grand Rabbi Chaim Hager of Kosov (1755–1854), author of Toras Chayim—son of Rabbi Menachem Mendel
    - Grand Rabbi Yaakov Shimshon Hager of Kosov (1814–1880)—son of Rabbi Chayim, continued the dynasty in Kosov
      - Grand Rabbi Moshe Hager of Kosov (1860–1925), author of Leket Oni—son of Rabbi Yaakov Shimshon
        - Grand Rabbi Shraga Feivish Hager of Zalishtshik (1870–1937)—son-in-law of Rabbi Moshe of Kosov and son of Rabbi Boruch of Vizhnitz
          - Grand Rabbi Avraham Yehoshua Heshel Hager of Kosov-Zalishtshik (died 1999)—son of Rabbi Shraga Feivish of Zalishtshik
            - Grand Rabbi Shraga Feivish Hager, Kosover Rebbe of Borough Park—son of Rabbi Avraham Yehoshua Heschel of Kosov(1958-2024)
            - Grand Rabbi Menachem Mendel Hager, present Kosover Rebbe of Borough Park—son of Rabbi Shraga Feivish Hager of Kosov
    - Grand Rabbi Yosef Alter Hager of Radovitz
    - Grand Rabbi Menachem Mendel Hager of Vizhnitz, author of Tzemach Tzaddik, son of Rabbi Chayim, founder of the Vizhnitz branch of the Kosov dynasty.
      See Vizhnitz (Hasidic dynasty)
  - Grand Rabbi David Hager of Zablitov, son of Rabbi Menachem Mendel

== See also ==
- Vizhnitz (Hasidic dynasty)
- History of the Jews in Poland
- History of the Jews in Galicia (Central Europe)
- History of the Jews in Ukraine
