= Mendl =

Mendl is a surname. Notable people with the surname include:

- Charles Mendl (1871–1958), British diplomat and actor
- Derek Mendl (1914–2001), Argentine cricketer
- Hugh Mendl (1919–2008), British record producer, A&R representative and manager
- Jack Mendl (1911–2001), Argentine cricketer and educator
- Michael Mendl (1944–2026), German actor
- Sigismund Mendl (1866–1945), British politician and businessman

== See also ==
- Lady Mendl (c. 1859–1950), American actress and interior decorator
- Mendel (disambiguation)
