= Menachem Mendel Hager =

Israeli rabbi

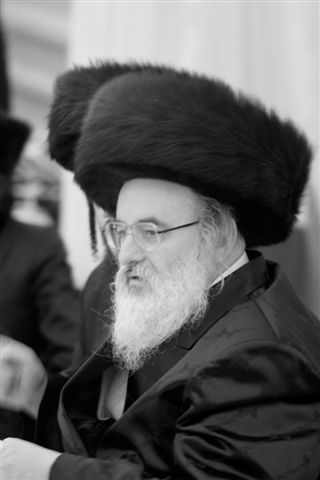
Rabbi Menachem Mendel Hager

Rabbi Menachem Mendel Hager (Hebrew: מנחם מנדל הגר; born November 28, 1957) is one of the two Grand Rabbis of the Viznitz (Admor Mviznitz) Hasidic dynasty in Bnei Brak and a current member of Moetzes Gedolei HaTorah (Council of great Torah Sages) of the Agudat Yisrael movement.

== Children ==
- Rebbetzin Machle, the wife of Rabbi Yoel Moshe Mordecai Katz, son of Grand Rabbi Usher Anshil of Vien (Hasidic community) in Williamsburg.
- Rabbi Chaim Meir, married Rebbetzin Nechama Mirel, daughter of Grand Rabbi Naftali Tzvi Weiss of Spinka Borough Park – Serves as a Chief Rabbi of his father's followers in the United States.
- Rebbetzin Sarah Rivkah, the wife of Rabbi Boruch Hager, son of Grand Rabbi Ya'kov Hager of Seret Vizhnitz ( A branch of the Vizhnitz dynasty) in Haifa.
- Rebbetzin Margulis, was married to Rabbi David Rosenbaum, son of Grand Rabbi Meir of Premishlan.They divorced in 2019.
