= Resignation (Friedrich Schiller) =

Poem by Friedrich Schiller

Resignation is a poem by Friedrich Schiller, published in 1786 in the journal Thalia.

What one refuses in a minute

No eternity will return.

— Closing lines of Resignation
