= Julius Meinl I =

Austrian entrepreneur (1824–1914)

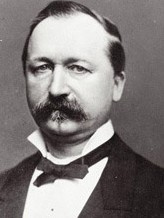
Julius Meinl I

Julius Meinl I (10 April 1824 – 24 December 1914) was an Austrian businessman and the founder of Julius Meinl AG, commonly known as Julius Meinl.

Meinl was born in Graslitz (Kraslice), Bohemia, the son of master baker Franz Anton Meinl and his wife Anna (née Dotzauer). His grandfather on the Meinl side was also a master baker in Graslitz.

He based his coffee roasting company in Vienna, Austria (then Austria-Hungary).

He died in Vienna at age 90. Following a short illness, Meinl died on the morning of 24 December 1914. After a period of mourning at St. Stephen’s Cathedral, he was interred in the family crypt at Dornbach Cemetery in Vienna.

== See also ==
- Meinl (disambiguation)
