= Julius Meinl =

Austrian coffee company

- Type: Private
- Industry: Coffee roasting
- Founded: 1862
- Founder: Julius Meinl I
- Headquarters: Vienna, Austria
- Products: Coffee
- Revenue: ▲€180 million (2018)
- Number of employees: 845
- Website: Official website

Julius Meinl International (German: Julius Meinl AG, Meinl-Gruppe), also known simply as Julius Meinl, is an Austrian manufacturer and retailer of coffee, gourmet foods and other grocery products. The company is based in Vienna, Austria, and it is named after the founder, Julius Meinl I.

== History ==
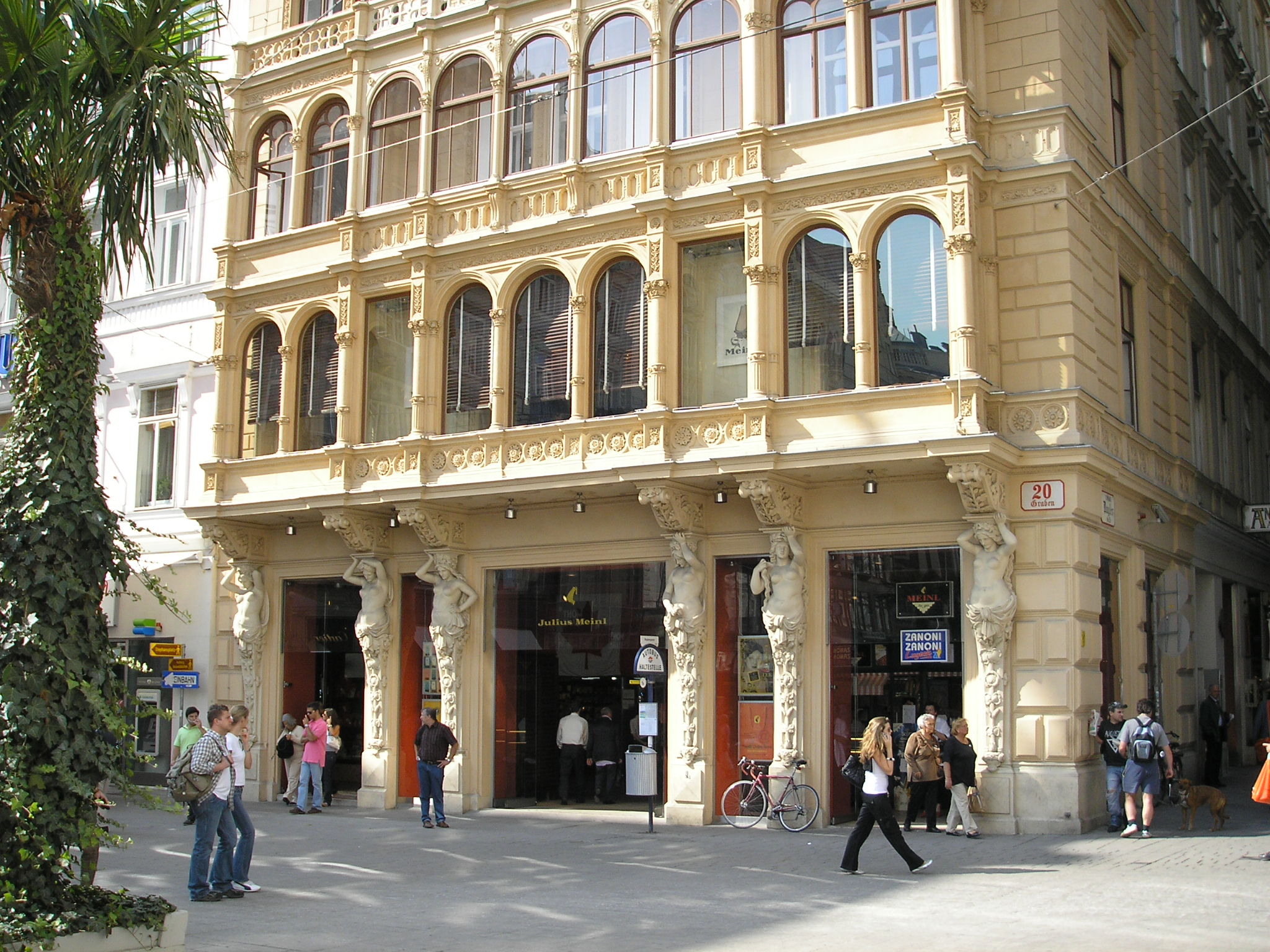
Meinl am Graben in Vienna, 2006

Julius Meinl I was the founder of a new category, selling ready-roasted coffee for the first time in 1862.

In German-occupied Warsaw and Minsk, Meinl owned four grocery and luxury food stores where locals were not allowed to shop.

Julius Meinl III ceded control of the company in 1987 to his son, Julius Meinl IV. The retail division of the group, except the high-profile flagship store in downtown Vienna, was sold to REWE by Julius Meinl V in 1998–1999.

Later, the company's name was changed to Ragusa Beteiligungen, and the company was delisted from the Vienna Stock Exchange in February 2007.

Today, Julius Meinl is a leading coffee company in Austria, Central and Eastern Europe, and it sells coffees and teas in more than 70 countries. The company's motto is "How may I serve you?" Fifth-generation family members are still working in the business.

Its "Pay with a Poem" campaign has been running since 2014, inspiring people worldwide to pay for their coffee or tea with a poem. This campaign started in Bucharest at "Les Bourgeois", a very nice place in Old Town.

Julius Meinl formerly operated two coffee shops in the U.S., both on the North Side of Chicago, Illinois, before closing its final location in 2022.

Julius Meinl operates one location in North Geelong, Victoria, Australia.

Christina Meinl was appointed president of the Global Specialty Coffee Association in February 2020. Meinl aims to boost the sustainable specialty coffee agenda, expand the SCA's global network supporting local communities, and increase diversity within the organisation.

== Logo ==
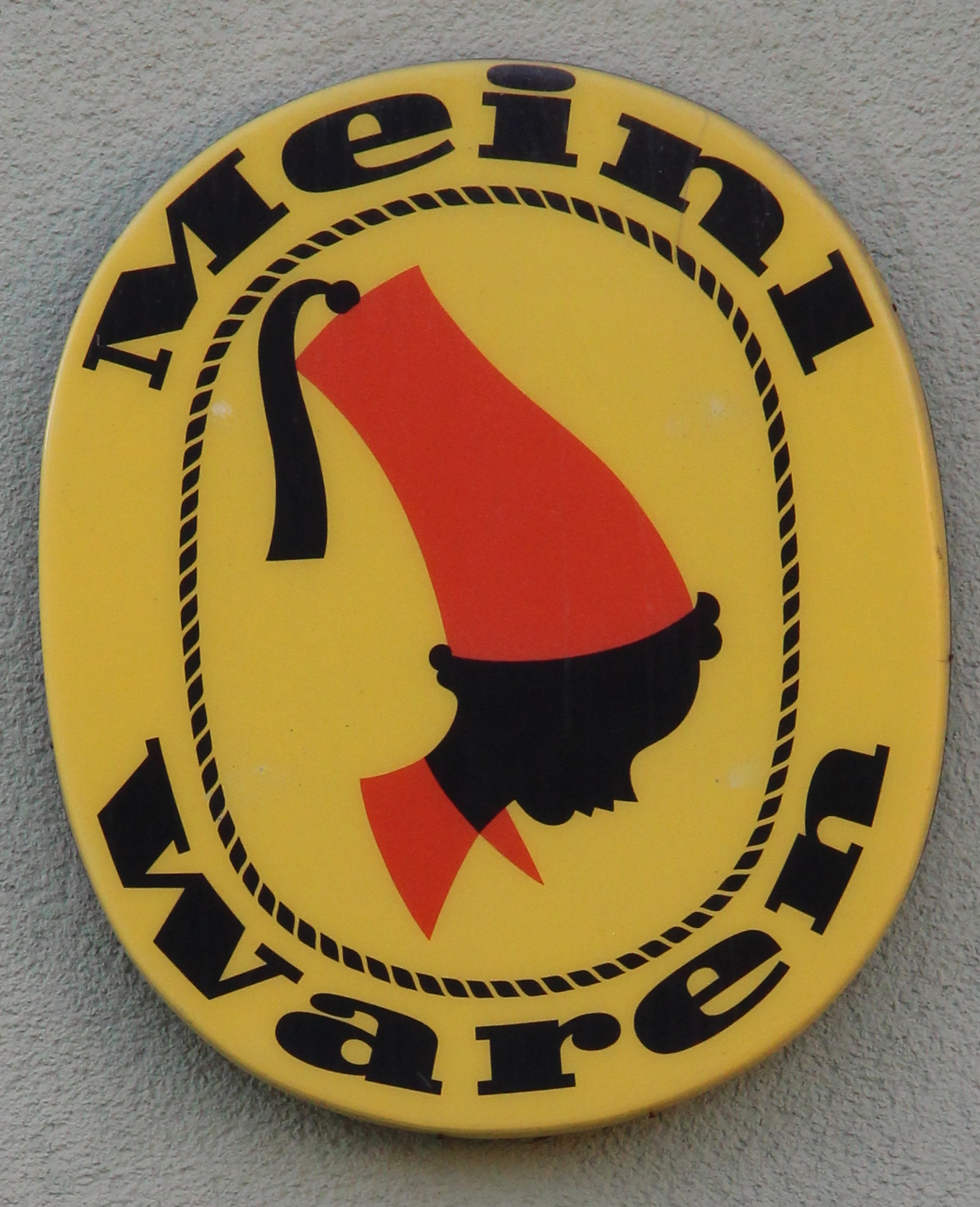
The old version of the logo

The first logo of the company was designed in 1924 by Joseph Binder, a Viennese graphic designer. The logo depicted a dark-skinned boy with a red fez on his head, as a hint to the origin of the coffee. The design has changed significantly over the years, but the silhouette of a boy has remained its core part.

In 2004, Italian designer Matteo Thun performed a redesign of the logo, making it look upright and using a single colour for the whole logo, effectively eliminating the boy's dark skin colour.

In 2007, an initiative called Mein Julius (English: "My Julius") started using the original version of the logo to protest against racist stereotypes and misinterpretations of Africa and the colonial period. This initiative has not indicated that they used the pre-redesign version of the logo, which led to criticism of the initiative itself.
