= Vizhnitz (Hasidic dynasty) =

Ukrainian Hasidic dynasty

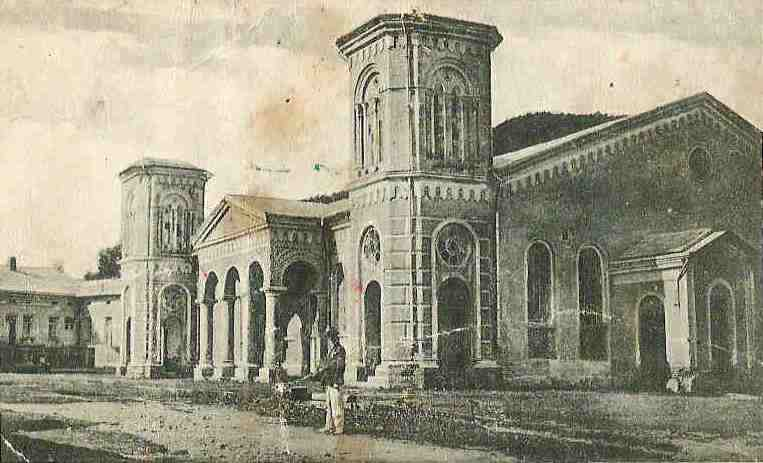
The Hasidic synagogue in Vyzhnytsia

Vizhnitz is the name of a Hasidic dynasty founded by Rabbi Menachem Mendel Hager. Vizhnitz (ויז׳ניץ or וויזשניץ) is the Yiddish name of Vyzhnytsia, a town in present-day Ukraine (then, a village in Austrian Bukovina).

Followers of the rebbes of Vizhnitz are called Vizhnitzer Hasidim.

== History of dynastic leadership ==
=== Menachem Mendel Hager ===
Menachem Mendel Hager was born on May 17, 1830, in Kosiv, now in Western Ukraine. He was the son of Rabbi Chaim Hager of Kosiv, the grandson of Menachem Mendel Hager of Kosov, his namesake, and the son-in-law of Rabbi Israel Friedman of Ruzhyn. He was appointed Rebbe at the age of 24, and soon after, he moved to Vyzhnytsia, a small town close to Kosiv. As his reputation grew, so did his followers. He became known and admired for his charitable acts, sincerity in prayer, and love for Eretz Yisrael. In his older years, he endeavored to emigrate there. He had two sons, Reb Boruch and another, Reb Yaakov Dovid, who died during his lifetime. His son-in-law was the son of Rabbi Yehoshua Rokeach of Belz, Reb Shmuel of Sokal. His Torah thoughts were published under the title Tzemach Tzaddik. He died on October 18, 1884, and was buried in Vyzhnytsia. His son Reb Boruch took his place, becoming the second Rebbe of Vizhnitz.

=== Boruch Hager ===
Boruch Hager was born in 1845 and was named after Rabbi Boruch of Medzhybizh at the behest of his grandfather, Yisroel Friedman of Ruzhyn. In 1885, aged 40, he inherited the mantle of leadership from his father, Menachem Mendel Hager, and became rebbe to thousands of Hasidim. He led them for only eight years until his death in 1892. His Torah thoughts were collected in Imrei Boruch by his son-in-law. Eight of his sons became rebbes in different locales: His eldest, Reb Yisroel, succeeded him in Vyzhnytsia; Reb Chaim became rebbe in Ottynia; Reb Moshe in Suceava; Reb Shmuel Avrohom Abba in Horodenka; Reb Yaakov Yitzchok Dovid in Storozhynets; Reb Pinchos in Borsha; Reb Feivish in Zelishtshik; Reb Yechiel Michel succeeded his brother in Horodenka. Another son, Reb Sholom, died in his youth. His sons-in-law were Reb Shmuel Dov Chodorov of Petriva; Reb Mordechai Chodorov of Kolomea, who published Imrey Boruch; Reb Sholom Yosef Friedman of Sadigur-Chernovitz.

=== Yisroel Hager ===
Yisroel Hager was born on August 20, 1860. He was the first-born son of Rabbi Boruch Hager. He married the daughter of Rabbi Meir Horowitz of Dzhikov. In 1875, he moved to his father-in-law's house and studied at great length with his brother-in-law Rabbi Yehoshua of Dzikov. Three years later he returned to Vyzhnytsia and became very close to his grandfather, Rabbi Menachem Mendel Hager. In 1893 he was appointed as rebbe in Vyzhnytsia. The young rebbe invigorated the dynasty and attracted many more followers from the surrounding provinces. He established many Talmud Torahs, and also a yeshiva, to which he appointed his son Rabbi Menachem Mendel as rosh yeshiva. When World War I broke out he was forced to move to Grosswardein (Oradea). He lived there until his death on 2 June 1936. In 1949, his remains were transferred to Israel and re-interred in Zichron Meir, Bnei Brak.

Hager had 5 sons and six daughters. Four of his sons became Rebbes:

- Reb Menachem Mendel of Visheve
- Reb Chaim Meir (Chayim Meir'l), who inherited his father's position in Grosswardein
- Reb Eliezer of Vyzhnytsia, author of Demesek Eliezer
- Reb Boruch of Siret, founder of the Seret-Vizhnitz Hasidic dynasty

=== Chaim Meir Hager ===
After the Holocaust, Reb Chaim Meir settled in Bnei Brak, Israel, to build a community there. Disciples from pre-war Europe gathered around him, and formed a comprehensive net of educational and communal institutions. He became a spiritual mentor of the Agudas Yisrael party in the Israeli Knesset. Agudas Yisrael won substantial government aid for Bnei Brak and affiliated communities, in return for its support in coalition governments.

Reb Chaim Meir had two sons: the older Moshe Yehoshua (Reb Moshelle), and the younger Mordechai (Reb Mottele).

Reb Chaim Meir's sons-in-law include Rabbis Yidele Horowitz, Yitzchok Yaakov Weiss (both were married to Reb Chaim Meir's daughter, Miriam), Moshe Ernster and Yisrael Friedman (married to Reb Chaim Meir's daughter, Tziporah. Their son is Hoshea Friedman).

=== Moshe Yehoshua Hager ===
Rabbi Moshe Yehoshua Hager, was the Vizhnitser Rebbe in Bnei Brak. He died on March 13, 2012, aged 95. He had two sons and four daughters. His elder son is Rabbi Yisroel, named after his grandfather, the "Ahavas Yisroel"; his other son is Rabbi Menachem Mendel, named after the founding Vizhnitzer Rebbe, author of Tzemach Tzaddik. Rabbi Moshe Yehoshua's sons-in-law are famous rabbis. The eldest daughter married Rabbi David Twersky, the Skverer Rebbe of New Square, New York. One daughter married Rabbi Yissachar Dov Rokeach, the Belzer Rebbe from Jerusalem. One daughter married Rabbi Aaron Teitelbaum, the Satmar Rebbe from Kiryas Joel, New York. The youngest daughter married Rabbi Menachem Ernster, the rosh yeshiva of the Vizhnitz Yeshiva in Bnei Brak.

=== Mordechai Hager ===
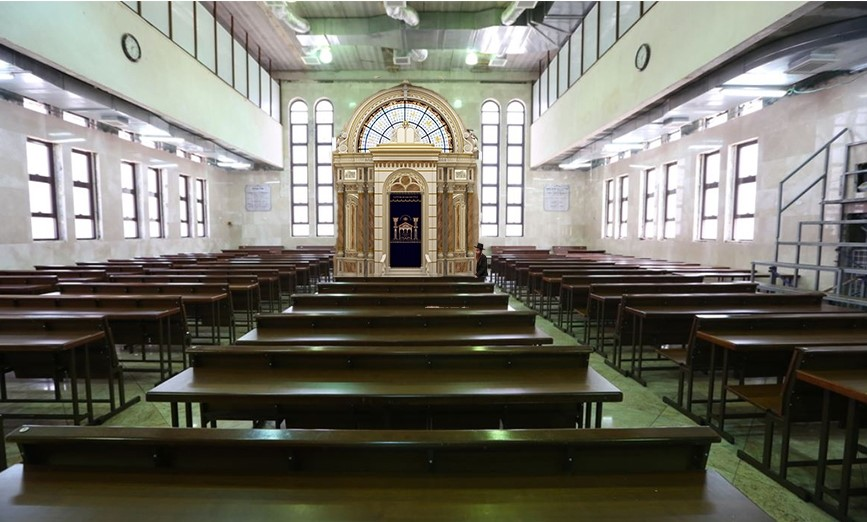
The Great Synagogue of Vizhnitz Beit Shemesh, with a new Holy Ark

Rabbi Mordechai Hager, born in 1922, was the Vizhnitzer Rebbe in Monsey until his death in 2018. Following the death of his father Rabbi Chaim Meir Hager of Bnei Brak, Israel, thousands of Vizhnitz hasidim followed him. When he died he was the oldest hasidic rabbi in the world. He was known for his devotion to learning Torah: he studied 18 hours a day and asked his Chasidim to study at least two hours every day. He had about 3,000 to 5,000 followers internationally.

Rabbi Mordechai died on March 16, 2018 (29 Adar 5778), at Mount Sinai Hospital. The funeral was held with the attendance of 100,000 mourners. He was buried in the Vishnitzer Cemetery in Monsey, New York. Rabbi Mordechai bore 14 children, 8 sons and 6 daughters. His sons and grandson serve as leaders of his followers in the United States and internationally: Rabbi Yisroel in Monsey, New York; Rabbi Mendel in Kiamesha Lake, New York; and Rabbi Yitzchok Yochonon in Williamsburg, Brooklyn. The other sons serve internationally: Rabbi Eliezer in Jerusalem, Israel or in Lakewood; Rabbi Dovid in London; Rabbi Aharon in Canada headquartered in Montreal, Quebec, his youngest son, Rabbi Buroch Shamshon, in Beit Shemesh, Israel; and his grandson Rabbi Yakov Yosef, son of eldest son Rabbi Pinchus Shulem, in Boro Park, Brooklyn.

== Lineage of the Vizhnitz-Kosov dynasty ==
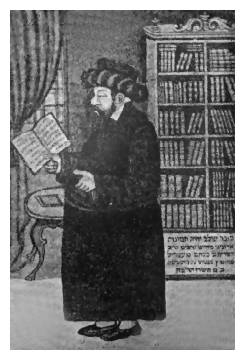
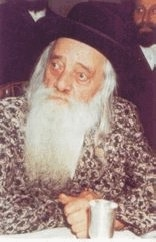
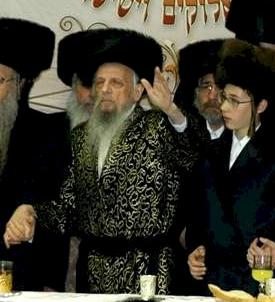
Yisroel ben Eliezer (1698–1760); The Baal Shem Tov
Yaakov Koppel Chossid of Kolomyia (disciple of the Baal Shem Tov)
Menachem Mendel Hager of Kosov; Ahavas Shalom
Chaim Hager of Kosov; Toras Chaim
Yaakov Shimshon Hager of Kosov	Yosef Alter Hager of Radevitz (1820–1879) (son-in-law of Moshe Zvi of Savran)	Menachem Mendel Hager, 1st Rebbe of Vizhnitz; Tzemach Tzadik (1830-1884) (son in law of Reb Yisroel of Ruzhin)
Boruch Hager; 2nd Rebbe of Vizhnitz; Imrei Boruch (1845-1892)
Yisroel Hager; 3rd Rebbe of Vizhnitz; Ahavas Yisroel (1860–1936)	Chaim Hager of Ottynia; Tal Chaim (1863–1931)	Moshe Hager of Shotz	Shmuel Avrohom Abo Hager of Horodenka	Yitschok Yaakov Dovid Hager of Storozhynets (1866–1932)	Pinchos Hager of Borsha
Menachem Mendl Hager; Rov of Visheve (1886–1941)	Chaim Meir Hager; 4th Rebbe of Vizhnitz; Imrei Chaim (1888-1972)	Eliezer Hager; Damesek Eliezer (1890–1945)	Baruch Hager; Vizhnitz Rebbe in Seret and Haifa; Mekor Baruch (1895-1963)	Israel Shalom Joseph Hager; Rebbe of Stanisławów	Menachem Mendel Hager; Rebbe of Ottynia
Moshe Yehoshua Hager, Rebbe of Vizhnitz; Yeshuas Moishe; Bnei Brak (1916–2012)	Mordechai Hager; Rebbe of Vizhnitz; Toras Mordechai; Monsey (1922-2018)	Eliezer Hager; Rebbe of Seret-Vizhnitz in Haifa	Moshe Hager previous Rosh Yeshivah of Seret-Vizhnitz
Yisroel Hager, Rebbe of Vizhnitz; Bnei Brak	Menachem Mendel Hager, Rebbe of Vizhnitz; Bnei Brak	Pinches Shulem Hager, "Ohr Shulem"; Vizhnitz Rov In Borough Park (1948–2015) (died prior to his father and did not become Rebbe)	Yisroel Hager, Rabbi of Viznitz; Monsey	Menachem Mendel Hager, Rebbe of Vizhnitz; Kiamesha Lake	Yitzchok Yochonon Hager, Rebbe of Vizhnitz; Williamsburg	Eliezer Zev Hager, Rebbe of Vizhnitz; Jerusalem and Lakewood lives currently in Boro Park New York	Duvid Hager, Rebbe of Vizhnitz; London	Aharon Hager, Rebbe of Vizhnitz; Montreal	Boruch Shamshon Hager, Rebbe of Vizhnitz; Beit Shemesh	Yaakov Hager; Rebbe of Seret-Vizhnitz in Haifa
Yaakov Yoseph Hager, Rebbe of Vizhnitz; Borough Park

== See also ==
- Vyzhnytsia
- List of Hasidic dynasties
