= Mendel (Hungarian family) =

The Jewish Hungarian family of Mendel is the name of a prominent Hungarian family which flourished in the latter half of the 15th century and in the first half of the 16th in Ofen (Buda). Members of three generations of it are known; namely, Jacob, Israel, and Isaac Mendel, who held the office of "Princeps Judæorum", "Supremus Judæorum," or "Præfectus Judæorum" between 1482 and 1539. This office, which seems to have existed only during that period, was created by King Matthias Corvinus in order to give the Jews an accredited representative at court, who at the same time should be responsible for the payment of their taxes. The "Præfectus Judæorum" was empowered to impose fines and other penalties on the Jews. As an official of the crown he was exempted from wearing the Jewish hat.

== Bibliography ==
- Kohn, Magyar Zsidók Története, pp. 216 et seq.;
- Engel, Geschichte des ungarischen Reiches, i. 80 et seq.;
- Büchler, A Zsidók Története Budapesten, pp. 50 et seq.;
- Ludwig Venetianer (Lajos Venetianer), A Zsidóság Szerverete, pp. 273 et seq., 326 et seq
