= Meindl (surname) =

Meindl is a German surname. Notable people with the surname include:

- Anthony Meindl (born 1968), American actor
- Eugen Meindl (1892–1951), German general
- James D. Meindl (1933–2020), American electrical engineer
- Leonardo Meindl (born 1993), Brazilian basketball player
