= Simon Rawidowicz =

American philosopher (1896–1957)

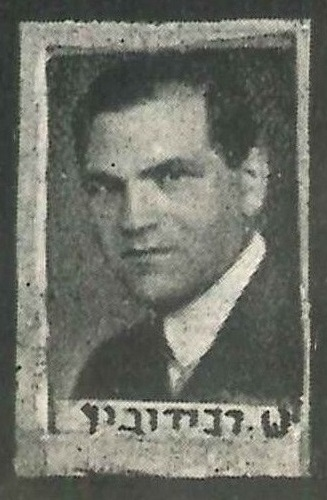
- Rawidowicz in 1926
- Born: 11 October 1896; Grajewo, Poland
- Died: July 1957 (aged 60); Waltham, Massachusetts, U.S.
- Occupation: Philosopher
- Spouse: Esther Eugenie Klee-Rawidowicz (1900-1980) (m. 1926)
- Relatives: Alfred Klee (father-in-law); Hannah Pick-Goslar (niece)

Simon Rawidowicz (11 October 1896 – July 1957) was a Polish-born American Jewish philosopher.

== Early life ==
Simon Rawidowicz was born in 1896 in Grajewo, Poland to Chaim Yitzchak Rawidowicz (later Ravid), a Zionist activist, a travelling merchant, a writer, and a pioneer farmer, and to Chana Batya (née. Rembelinker). A second of ten children – seven of whom survived childhood – he studied at the modern Yeshiva at Lida. Rawidowicz received a traditional Jewish education, during the course of which he became attracted to the Haskalah and Modern Hebrew literature. He was drawn to the reviving Hebrew language and literature, and before turning 18 he became a teacher at a cheder metukan ("improved cheder"). He was educated in Germany. 1933 he emigrated to the United Kingdom.

He married Esther Klee in 1926, the daughter of Alfred Klee and the maternal aunt of Hannah Pick-Goslar (Anne Frank's best friend).

== Career ==
Rawidowicz taught at the Jews' College in London and at the Leeds University (as of 1941). In 1948 he emigrated to the United States, first teaching at the College of Jewish Studies of Chicago. Rawidowicz served as the chair of the Department of Near-Eastern and Judaic Studies at Brandeis University. He was the author of several books and essays, some of which were published posthumously.

Rawidowicz was a critic of Zionism. In his essay entitled Between Jew and Arab, he suggested that early Arab refugees in Israel were treated differently from Jews as early as 1948. In The Ever-Dying People, he argued that each generation of Jews was afraid of extinction.

== Death ==
Rawidowicz died of a heart attack in 1957 in Waltham, Massachusetts.

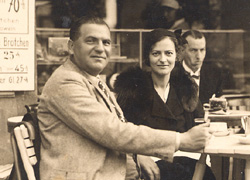
Simon Rawidowicz in a Berlin cafe in 1932.

== Works ==
- Rawidowicz, Simon (1952). The Chicago Pinkas. Chicago, Illinois: College of Jewish Studies. OCLC 2922981.
- Rawidowicz, Simon (1974). Studies in Jewish Thought. Philadelphia, Pennsylvania: Jewish Publication Society of America. ISBN 9780827600577. OCLC 1255999.
- Rawidowicz, Simon (1986). Ravid, Benjamin C. I. (ed.). Israel, The Ever-Dying People, and Other Essays. Rutherford, New Jersey: Fairleigh Dickinson University Press. ISBN 9780838632536. OCLC 13185419.
