= David Zakai =

Israeli journalist (1886–1978)

- דוד זכאי
- Born: David Zhukovitzky; 16 September 1886; Ostrowshitsky, Minsk region, Russian Empire (now Belarus)
- Died: 15 January 1978 (aged 91); Tel Aviv, Israel
- Citizenship: Israeli
- Occupations: Hebrew teacher, Journalist
- Known for: Member of the Second Aliyah, Histadrut leader, Founding staff member of the newspaper Davar
- Spouse: Rachel Aaronsohn Hacohen
- Children: Yaakov, Chana, Avraham
- Awards: Sokolov Prize

David Zakai (Hebrew: דוד זכאי; 16 September 1886 – 15 January 1978) was a member of the Second Aliyah, a Hebrew teacher, a Histadrut leader, a Jewish journalist and publicist during the Yishuv era and for 30 years after the establishment of the state of Israel.

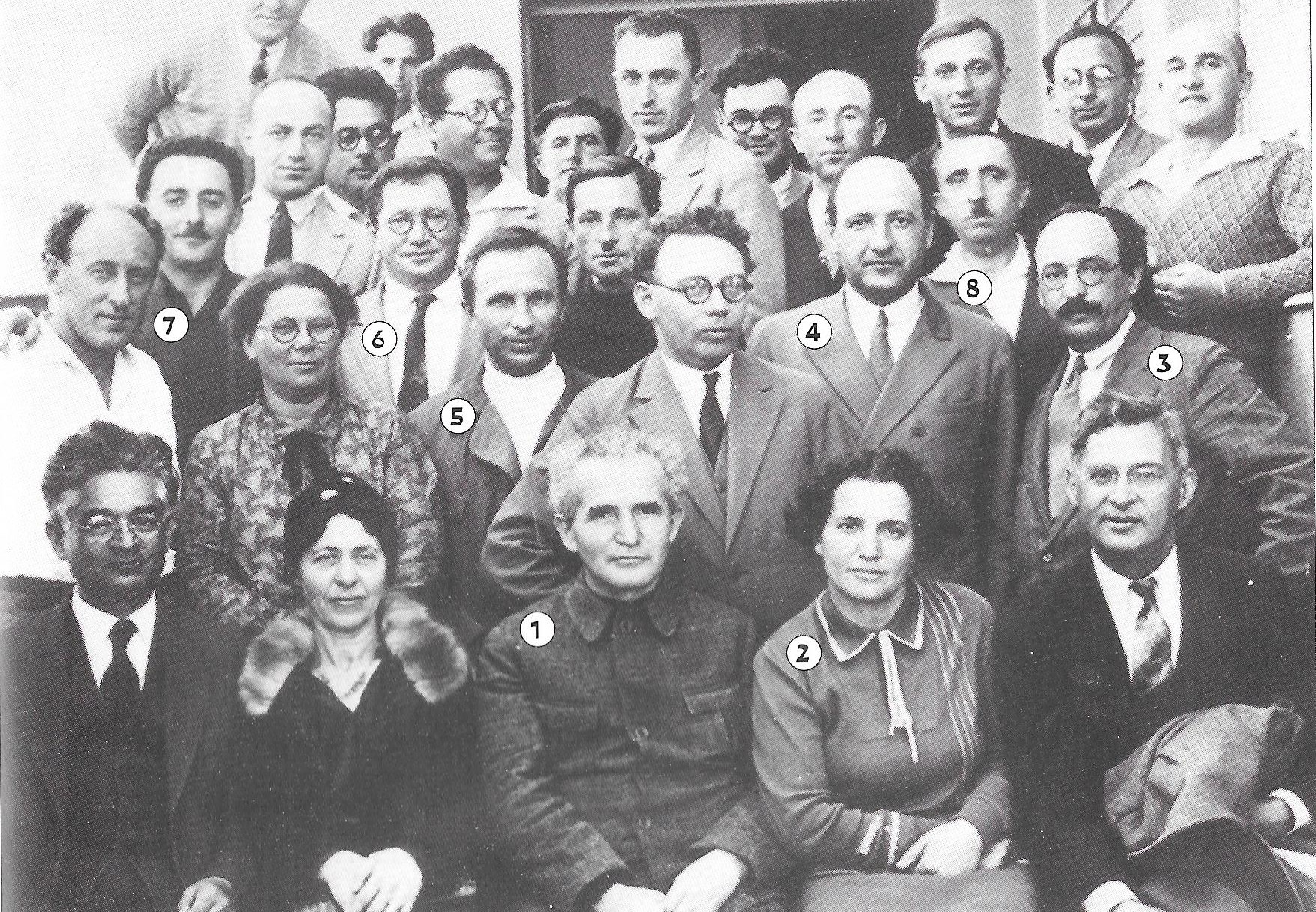
A group photograph on the occasion of the publication of the newspaper Davar, numbered: 1 David Ben-Gurion, 2 Paula Ben-Gurion, 3 Zalman Shazar, 4 Eliezer Kaplan, 5 Eliyahu Golomb, 6 David Zakai, 7 Moshe Sharett, and 8 Israel Guri, 1925.

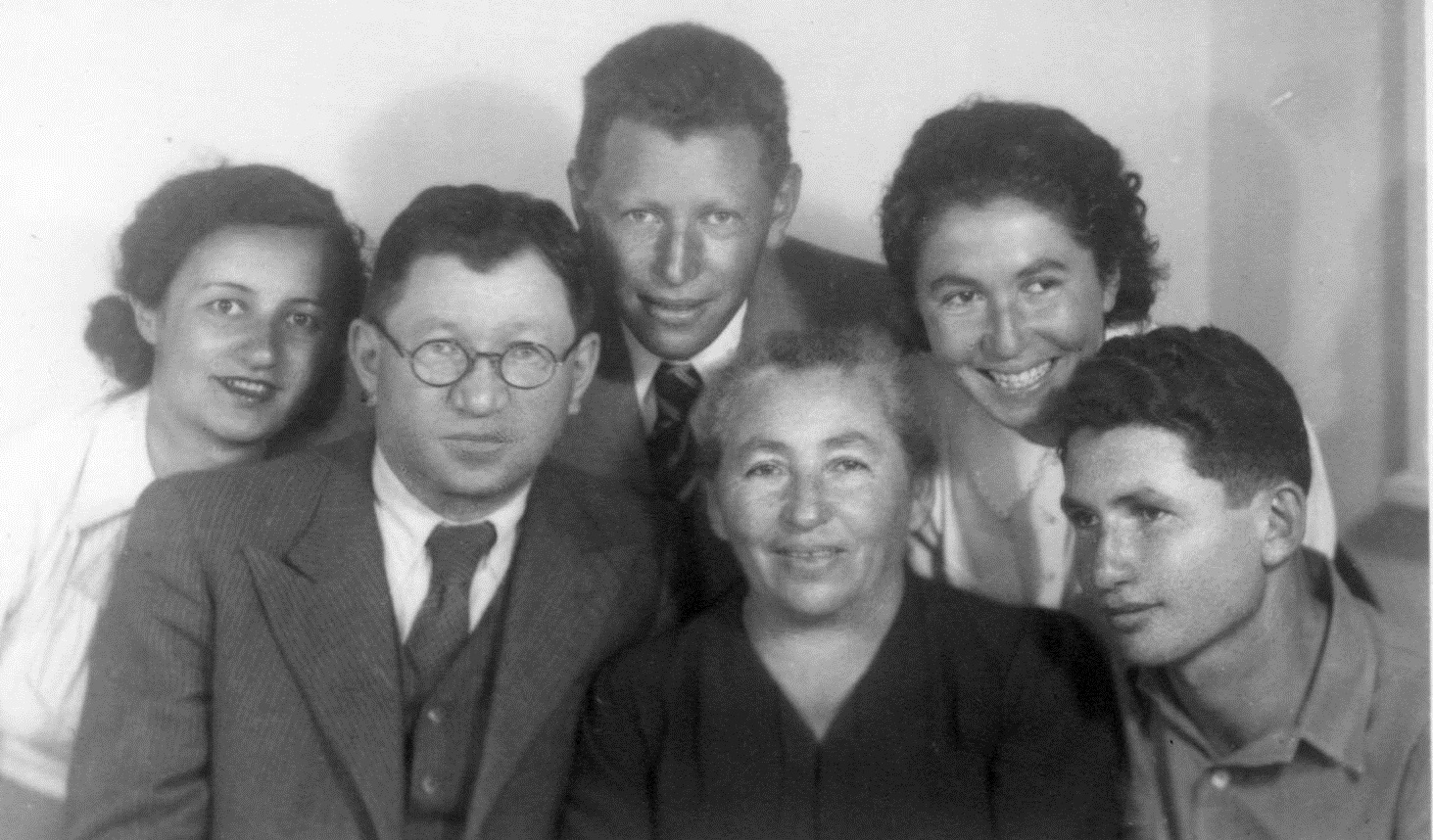
The Zakai family from left to right: Irma the wife of Yaakov, the father David Zakai, the eldest son Yaakov, the daughter Chana, the mother Rachel, and the youngest son Avraham

== Early life in Belarus ==
David Zakai was born in 1886 in the name of David Zhukovitzky in the town of Astrashytski Haradok in the Minsky Uyezd, in the Russian Empire (modern Belarus), the son of Yitzhak Zhukovitzky (the descendant of Rabbi Yeshaya Zhukovitzer, an educated merchant, who wrote in HaMelitz and HaTzfira, and of Hoda Gitlin. He received traditional Jewish education in a cheider, then a yeshiva in Minsk.

From an early age he was drawn to the idea of Jewish national revival and the revival of the Hebrew language. After completing his studies, he served as a Hebrew teacher in Hebrew in a cheder metukan ("improved cheder") in the Mogilev Governorate and at a Hebrew school for girls in the Kherson Governorate.

== In the Land of Israel ==
After his marriage, 1909, he immigrated to Israel with his wife Rachel, after David had visited it in the summer of 1908. In Israel, he served again as a teacher in the villages of Gedera and Beer Tuvia. He was a member of the Labor movement and wrote notes in the HaPoel HaTsair. Among the friends of David was the writer Yosef Haim Brenner.

In the summer of 1914 he went to accompany a group of high school students from Herzliya to their parents' homes in Russia, and due to the outbreak of the First World War, he could not return to Israel until Passover 1920. Upon his return he became the director of the Ahdut HaAvoda cultural committee.

With the establishment of the Histadrut in 1920, he was briefly the temporary secretary general until David Ben-Gurion was elected in 1921 as the first secretary general.

At the recommendation of David Ben-Gurion, David Zochovitzky changed his surname to Zakai (Hebrew for innocent), slightly resembling the original name in sound.

Until the founding of the newspaper Davar in 1925, he edited the publication of the Histadrut ("Pinkas") and the publication of Achdut HaAvoda, "Kuntras", where he also published his column Turim. With the founding of Davar, he joined the staff of the newspaper in which he published his columns, was a member and the secretary of the editorial board, the editor of the night editor and for a while also the general editor. His signature, Z. David, accompanied him throughout his years in Davar. [3] In his section Short, he spoke succinctly of his life experiences, events from the life of the Yishuv and the Jewish people, and wrote about people, books and intellectuals. The "Short" articles were grouped into two books. He was an amateur astronomer and reviewed celestial bodies in his monthly column "BaShamayim" (In Heaven).

At the time of the 1929 riots, a weapon of the Haganah was hidden in the cellar of his home in Tel Aviv, on the Keren Kayemeth LeIsrael (later Ben-Gurion Boulevard). The telescope at his roof did double duty for the Haganah to guard the region. In the yard of his home, there was a tiny meteorological station, which reported for many years the amounts of precipitation measured.

Zakai served as the delegate to the 19th Zionist Congress in Lucerne, 1935. He was a member of the Central Committee of the Teachers Union, a member of the Education Committee, and wrote in Education.

== In the State of Israel ==
In the 1950s, he lectured on Kol Israel and in various forums on Aggadah and Midrashim of the Sages. In 1956 he won the Sokolov Prize for journalism.

== Family ==
In 1909 he married Rachel, daughter to Rabbi Avraham Aaronsohn Hacohen. Rachel's brother was the author Zalman Yitzhak Anochi.

His son Yaakov was active in the Haganah, his daughter Hanna served in the Auxiliary Territorial Service of the British Army, and Avraham was the first commander of the Palyam and an officer in the Israeli Navy.

== Death and legacy ==
David Zakai died in Tel Aviv in 1978, at the age of 91. He was buried in the Nahalat Yitzhak cemetery. Zakai was survived by two sons and a daughter and seven grandchildren.

== See also ==
- Meir Ezri
