= Avraham Cholodenko =

Israeli Zionist leader, educator and Hebrew language reviver

- Born: 1871; Sytniaky, Kiev district, Russian Empire (now Ukraine)
- Died: 1942 (aged 70–71); Tel Aviv, Mandatory Palestine
- Resting place: Nahalat Yitzhak Cemetery
- Occupations: Zionist leader; educator; Printer
- Known for: Revival of Hebrew as a modern language in the Russian Empire; Founding figure in the General Zionists liberal party; Major role in founding Tel Aviv's Great Synagogue and Oneg Shabbat cultural center

Avraham Cholodenko (1871 – May 25, 1942) was a Zionist leader, educator, and one of the first revivers of Hebrew as a modern language in the Russian Empire. Cholodenko was a senior figure in the General Zionists liberal party and played a major role in the founding of Tel Aviv's Great Synagogue and Oneg Shabbat (joy of sabbath) cultural center—together with his friend, the prominent poet and intellectual Hayim Nahman Bialik.

== Biography ==
Cholodenko, son of Yacov and Hinda, was born in the impoverished village of Sytniaky in the district of Kiev of the Russian Empire (today's Ukraine). His mother died in childbirth, and as a newborn he was sent to the town of Ivankiv, where he was raised by his well-off uncle. A child of a traditional Jewish family influenced by the Haskalah movement, he studied the Hebrew Bible and excelled in Hebrew language and in both Jewish and European literature. His academic talents reached the ears of the local rabbi, Mordechai Levitzki, who became his private tutor.

Ultimately trained as a teacher and pedagogue, Cholodenko initiated his Zionist activity immediately after the First Zionist Congress of 1897. He worked diligently for the establishment of a Zionist association in the district of Kiev, which soon numbered more than 150 members. The orthodox Hasids in the area, who fiercely resisted his Zionist activity, circulated defamatory rumors against him, but the great rabbi Mordechai Dov Twerski (whose father founded the Hornosteipol Hasidic dynasty), defended Cholodenko's work and was instrumental in its expansion.

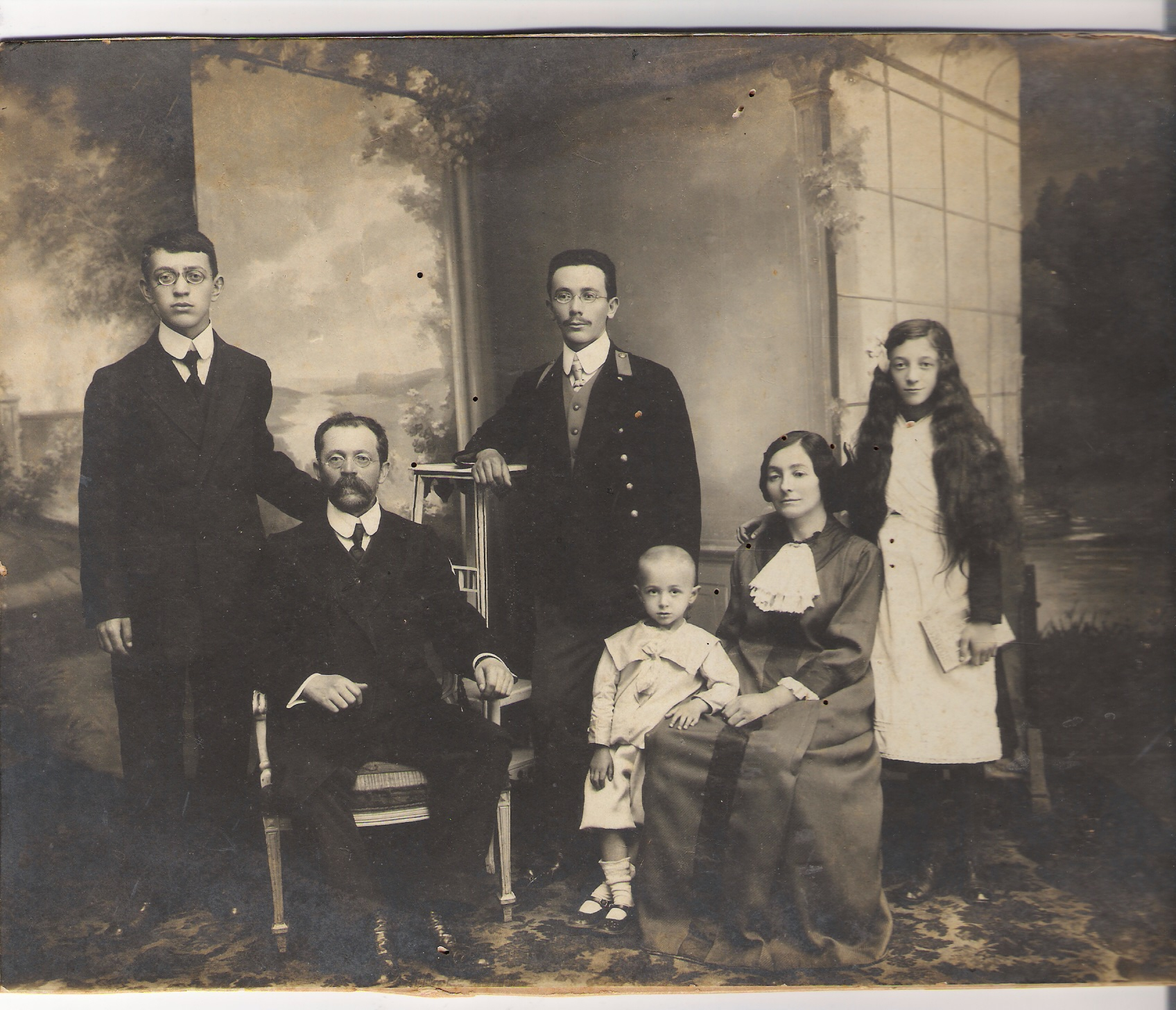
Avraham Cholodenko and his family, Kiev 1915

Cholodenko married Rivka, daughter of Yehuda Slutzki, a local Jewish leader ("Gvir"). With her he moved to Kiev, where he continued to advocate for Zionism, especially in the cultural realm. After the Second Zionist Congress (1898), he founded the first cheder metukan ("improved cheder") in Kiev—a Jewish school which combined traditional subjects like Torah and Talmud with secular education taught in Hebrew. Following the great success of this initiative, his cheder began to offer adult evening classes, which facilitated Zionist activity in Kiev and contributed to the Aliyah movement to Palestine. Among his prominent students was Rachel Yanait Ben-Zvi, a political leader of socialist Zionism and wife of the second president of Israel, Yitzhak Ben-Zvi. A chronic throat disease forced Cholodenko to end his teaching career, and he dedicated the rest of his life to printing Hebrew texts.

In 1917, at the outset of the Bolshevik Revolution, Cholodenko was elected a member of the first official Zionist committee in Kiev. He purchased a press house and changed its name to Tchiya (revival) as a symbol for the revival of the people of Israel. Cholodenko's press printed the Yiddish newspaper der Telegraph, but given growing Bolshevik censorship, his Zionist activities were forced underground. He started the clandestine synagogue "Knesset Israel" and a school which prepared youth for manual labor in Palestine.

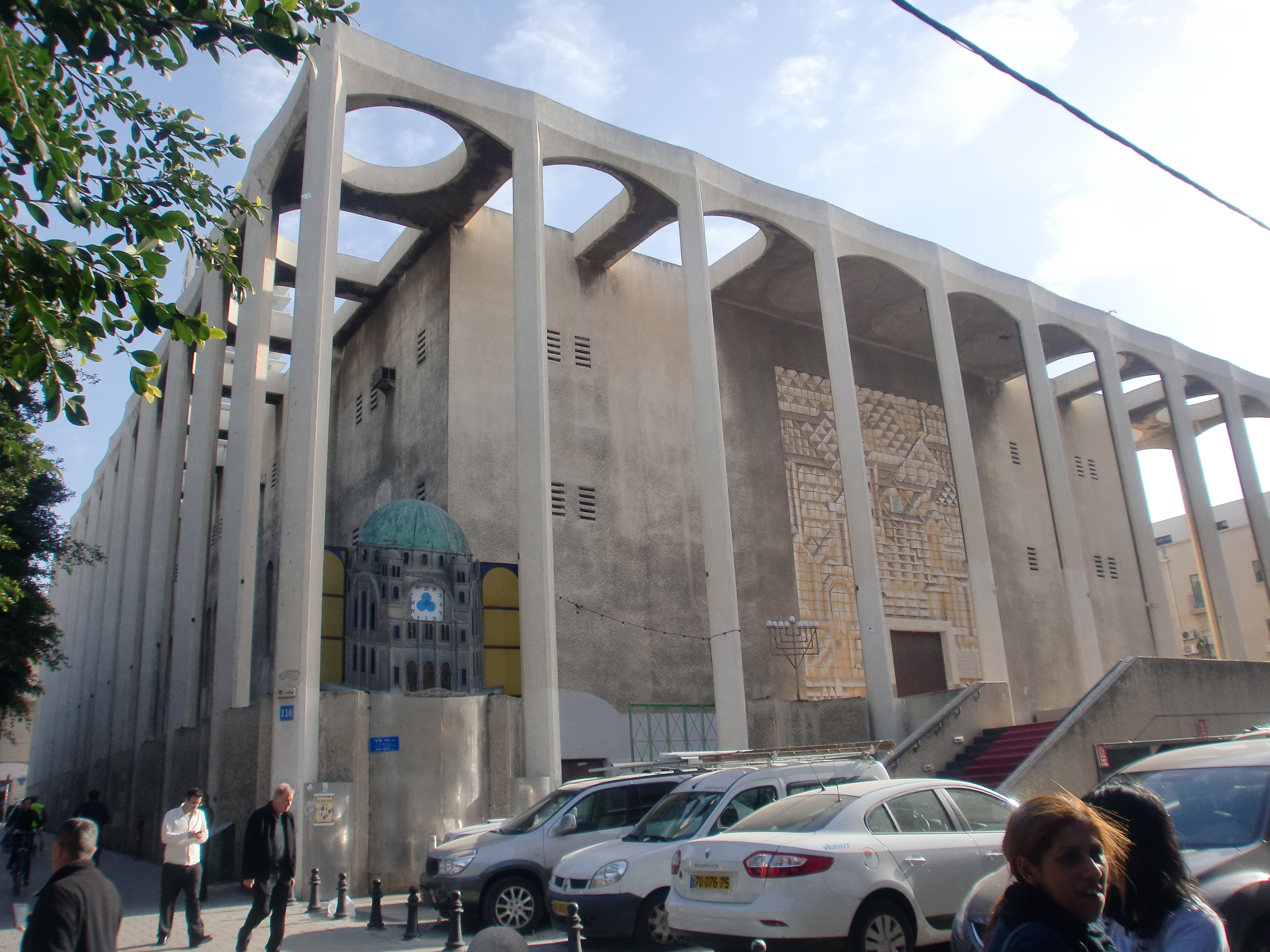
Great Synagogue Tel Aviv

In 1920, Cholodenko was arrested with a few of his associates and upon his release immigrated to Palestine with his family. In Tel Aviv, he founded (with his friend, Avraham Gutman) a printing press not far from the Gymnasia Herzlia, which gave the press its name. He was active in the General Zionists and Keren Hayesod (the Foundation Fund), representing the liberal (or "bourgeois") constituency in the Yishuv in opposition to the socialist majority. He was also a member of the Great Synagogue committee and donated substantial sums of money for its construction. His close friendship with Hayim Nahman Bialik was instrumental in the founding of the Oneg Shabbat center, a hub of cultural initiative in Tel Aviv of the 1930s. Cholodenko was also a board member of the Association of Russian Jews, the Jerusalem Society, and the Tel Aviv Housing Charity, donating some of his fortune to the city's poor. As a staunch liberal, he firmly believed that private initiative was not at odds with the Zionist enterprise.

Avraham Cholodenko died at Ohel Shem Hall in Tel Aviv in May 1942 in the middle of an assembly meeting of the General Zionists, which advocated for general education (instead of party controlled schools). He was buried in Nahalat YItzhak Cemetery.

== Personal life ==
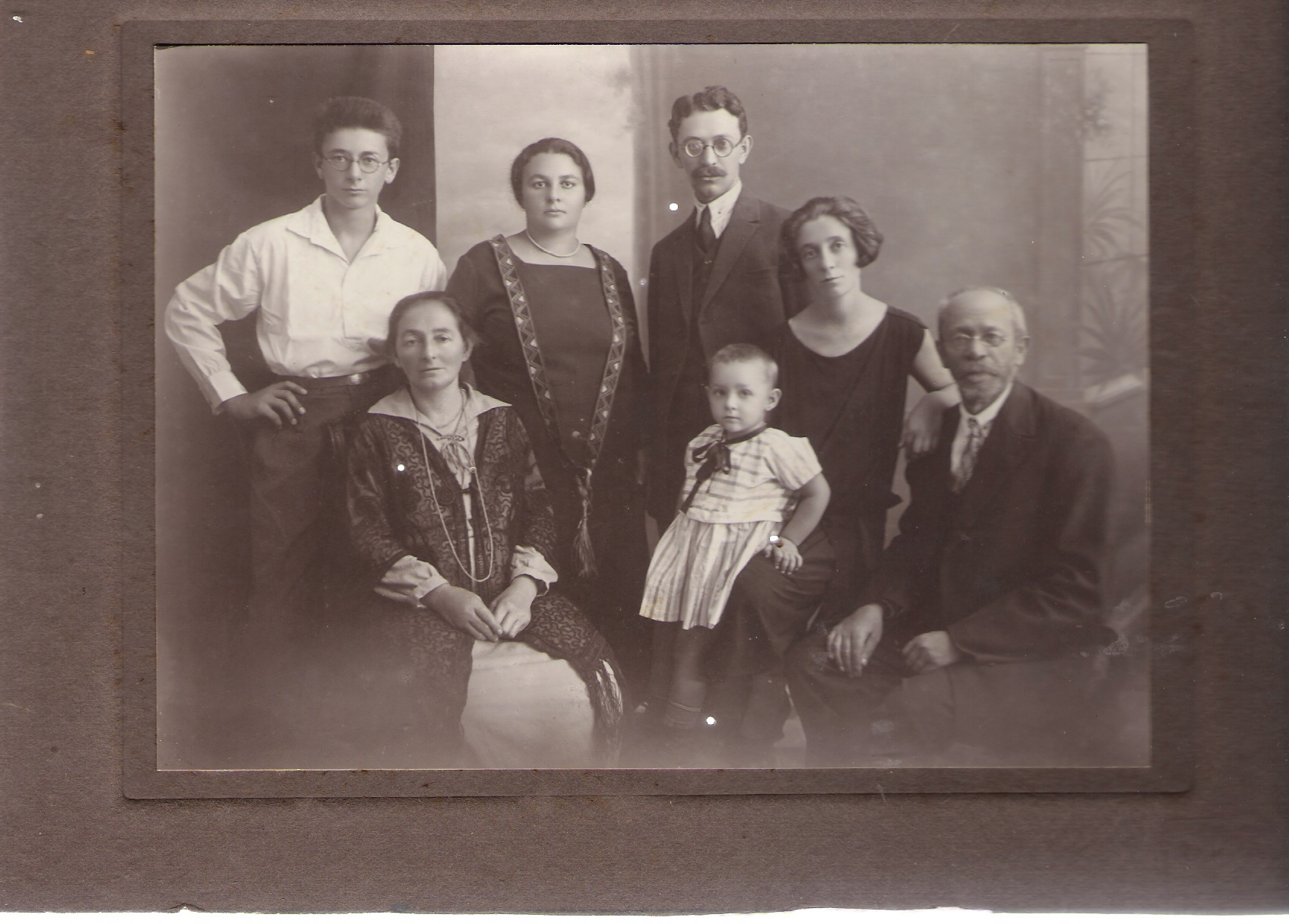
Avraham Cholodenko (sitting on the right) in Tel Aviv in 1928. Standing in the middle his son Aharon, and on the left—Eliyahu

His eldest son, Dr. Yitzhak/Isaac Cholodenko (1889-1917), distanced himself from his family's liberal Zionism and joined the Communist Party of the USSR. He served as a doctor in the Red Army and died of typhoid fever in a battlefield hospital at age 28 during the Russian Civil War.

His second son, Dr. Aharon Cholodenko, a graduate of Kiev University's medical school, was a Zionist activist during the British mandate in Palestine and a director of Kuppat Holim Amamait (later Kupat Holim Meuhedet—the third largest health care organization in Israel). He married Yehudit Cholodenko (née Feinschreiber), a member of the Tel Aviv Education Committee and of the Association for Women's Equality. Their daughter Tamara married the journalist Nehamia Ben-Avraham, and their son, Amnon Helled, was one of Israel's first lawyers. Helled married Tamar, cousin of Zvi Dinstein, a Knesset member and junior minister for the Labor Party, and of Yoram Dinstein, the fifth president of Tel Aviv University.

His daughter Nina (Pnina) Cholodenko married Shmuel Katz, a survivor of the Kiev pogroms (1919). Nina and Shmuel joined Ahdut Haavoda – Poale Zion (Labor Unity - Workers of Zion) and were among the founders of the urban Kibbutz Ef'al.

His youngest son, Eliyahu Cholodenko, was sent to Berlin to study piano at the famed Stern Conservatory under Alexander von Fielitz, graduating first in his class in 1931. A communist and anti Zionist, he returned to Palestine but left it in the 1940s and settled in Paris, working as a professor of music at the Conservatoire de Paris.Amongst his descendants, we find planetary scientist Ravit Helled, and another notable family member, Lisa Cholodenko, director, her great-grandfather Pincus was Abraham's 1st cousin.
