= Habima Theatre =

Theatre in Tel Aviv, Israel

Coordinates: 32°04′22″N 34°46′44″E

- תיאטרון הבימה

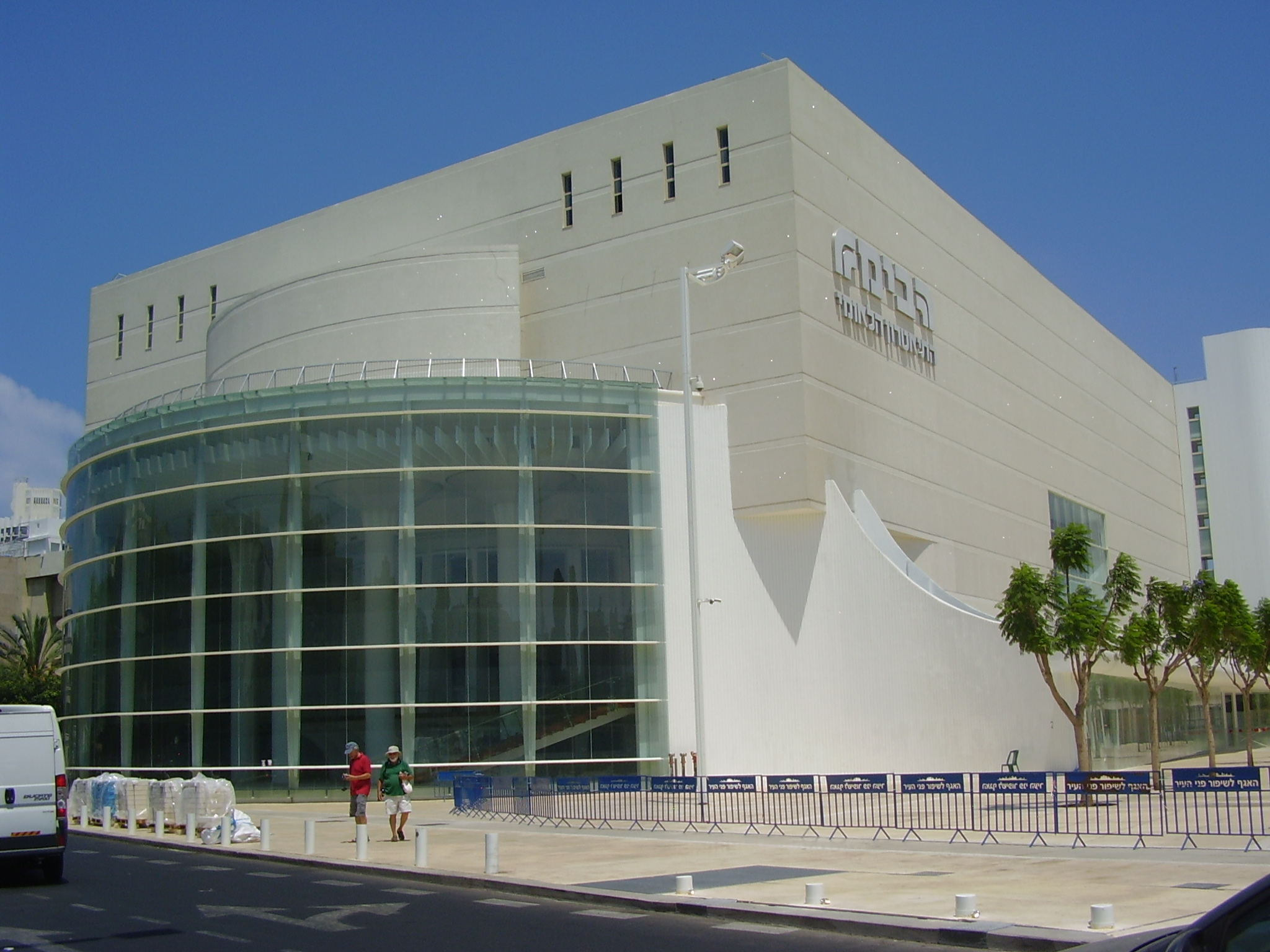
- Habima Theatre, 2011
- Interactive map of Habima Theatre
- Address: Habima Square; Tel Aviv; Israel
- Capacity: Rovina Theatre: 930 seats Meskin Theatre: 320 seats Bertonov Theatre: 220 seats Blanche Rapaport Theatre: 170 seats
- Type: National theatre

Construction
- Opened: 1912; 114 years ago
- Architects: Oskar Kaufmann, Eugene Stolzer

Website
- habima.co.il

The Habima Theatre (Hebrew: תיאטרון הבימה Te'atron HaBima, lit. "The Stage Theatre") is the national theatre of Israel and one of the first Hebrew language theatres. It is located in Habima Square in the center of Tel Aviv.

== Origin of the name ==
The name Habima (Hebrew: הבימה, "The Stage") is derived from the bimah, the raised platform in a synagogue from which the rabbi or prayer leader conducts prayers and the Torah is read. The founders chose the name because of its association with a platform for public expression and performance.

== History ==
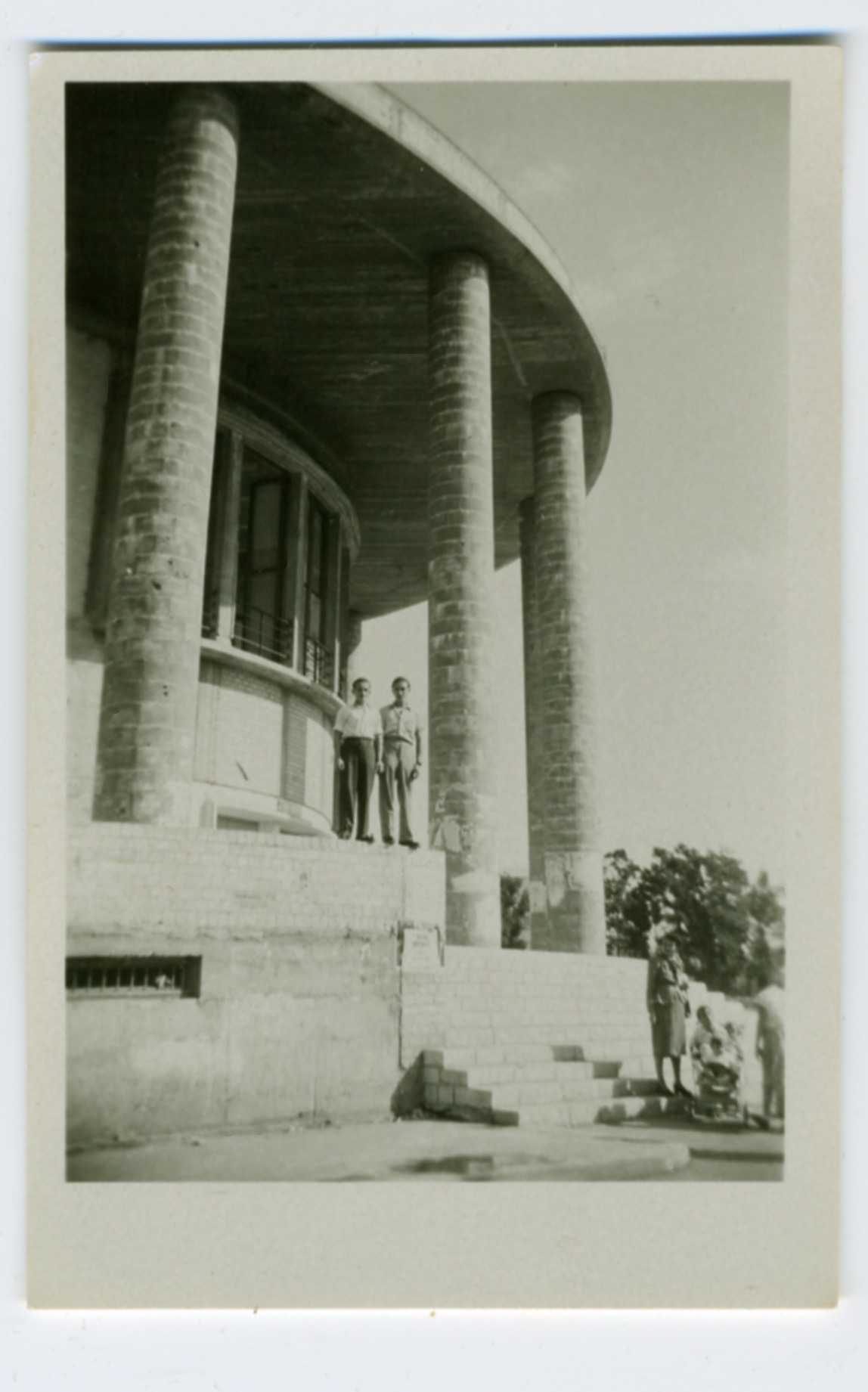
Historic building, c. 1950

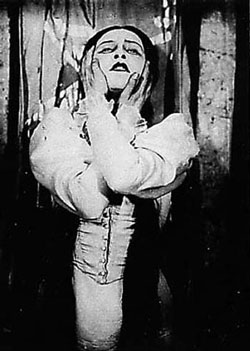
Hanna Rovina as Leah in S. Ansky's The Dybbuk (performed by Habima in the Hebrew-language translation by Hayyim Nahman Bialik).

Habima was founded as an amateur troup by Nahum Lazarevich Tsemakh (Hebrew: Naḥum Tsemaḥ; 1887–1939) in Białystok (then in Grodno Governorate, Russian Empire) in 1912. Menahem Gnessin was one of its cofounders and early actors. Because its performances were in Hebrew, invoked the Jewish folk tradition, and dealt with issues of the Jewish people, soon it was banned by Russian authorities, and the theatre troupe was forced to become a travelling one. Beginning in 1918, the theatre operated under the auspices of the Moscow Art Theatre, which some consider its actual beginning. On January 31, 1922, a production of The Dybbuk, premiered in Moscow and became the company’s signature production.

It encountered difficulties under the Soviet government as well, after the Russian Revolution. Konstantin Stanislavsky arranged for the mainly Jewish Polish actors to be trained by Yevgeny Vakhtangov. The People's Commissar for Nationalities Affairs, Joseph Stalin, also authorized the theatre's creation. However, the Yevsektsiya attempted to use its influence to cut off state funds to Habima, branding it counter-revolutionary.

=== International tour ===
In 1926, the theatre left the Soviet Union to tour abroad, in countries including Latvia, Lithuania, Poland, France, Germany, the Netherlands, and the United States. Their productions met with great success. In 1927, the company split up, with Zemach and some of the actors choosing to stay in the U.S.

=== Lodz Impact ===
The theatre staff visited the city of Lodz, and the pre-war photographer and artist Mendel Grossman, photographed the actors and actresses from the wings of the stage. His life was changed as a result of the visit of the theatre.

=== Establishment in Mandate Palestine (Eretz Israel) ===
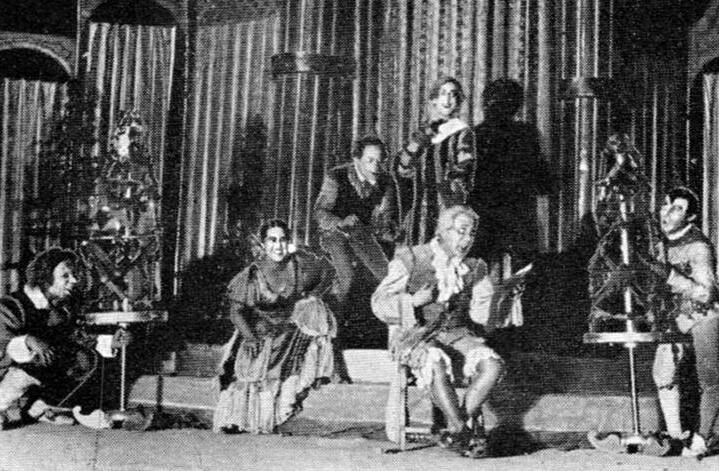
Habima stages Twelfth Night, Neues Schauspielhaus, 15 September 1930. First professional performance of Shakespeare in Hebrew.

Other members of the theatre took the company to Mandate Palestine in 1928. In the 1928–29 season there, the Habima Players presented two plays, both under the direction of Aleksei Dikiy, from the Moscow Art Theatre. The first production, Ha-otsar (The Treasure), a translation of Sholem Aleichem's Yiddish play Der Oytser, premiered on December 29, 1928. The second production, which premiered on May 23, 1929, in Tel Aviv, was Keter David (David's Crown), an adaptation by Hebrew writer Isaac Lamdan of The Hair of Absalom (Los cabellos de Absalón), by the 17th-century Spanish dramatist Calderón.

In 1930 the company traveled to Berlin, Germany, where it produced Shakespeare's Twelfth Night, directed by Michael Chekhov, and Karl Gutzkow's Uriel Acosta, under the direction of Alexander Granovski.

The company finally settled in Palestine in 1931. In 1945, it built a theatre in Tel Aviv, which it occupied before completion. In 1947 it produced The Heine Family (Heinrich Heine und sein Onkel) by Sammy Gronemann, translated by Avigdor Hameiri.

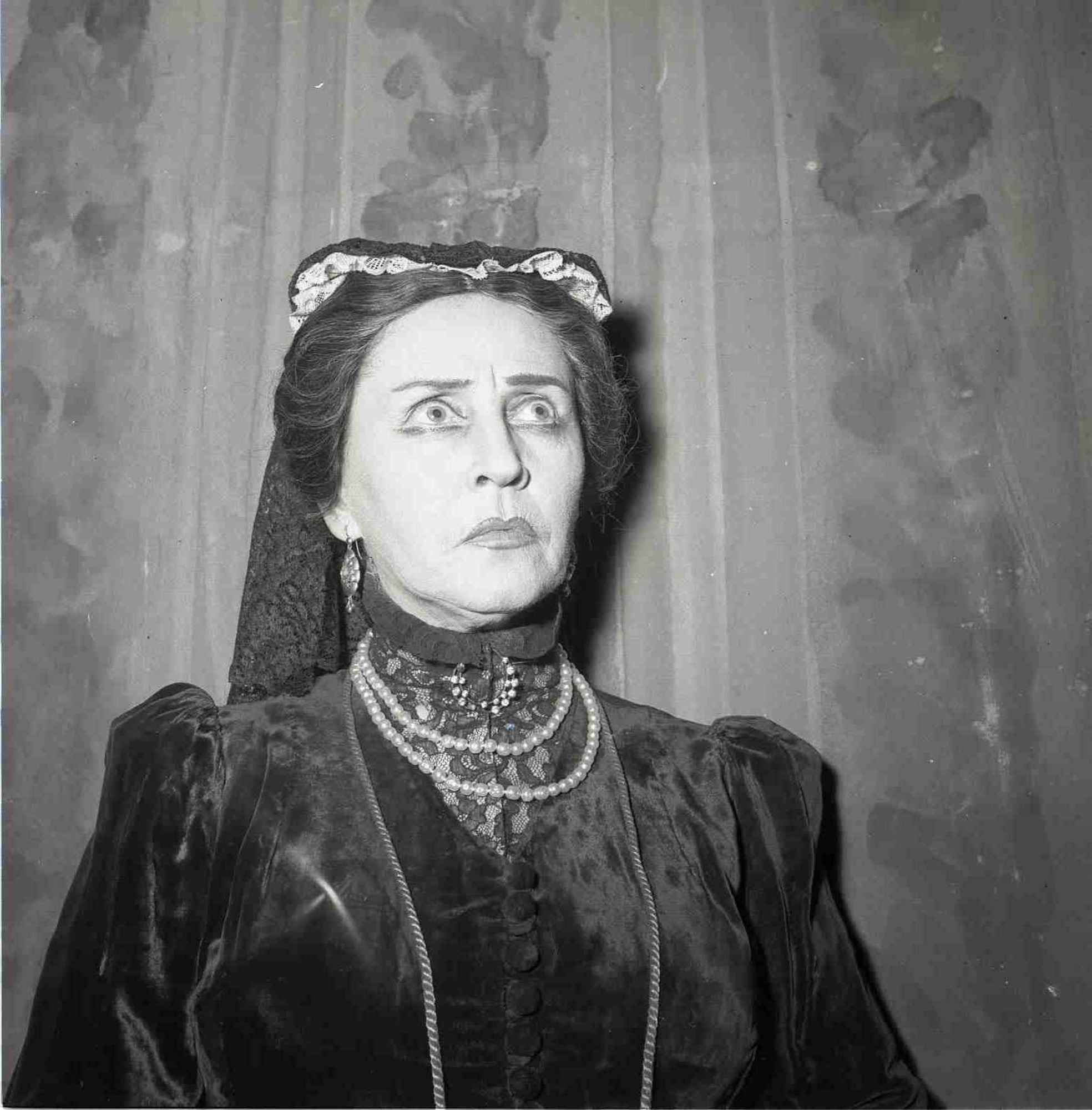
Hanna Rovina in Mirele Efros costume by Yitzhak Frenkel

=== National Theatre of Israel ===
Habima has been officially considered the national theatre of Israel since 1958, the year in which it received the Israel Prize for theatre. This was the first year in which the Prize was awarded to an organization. In the 21st century, Habima employs 80 actors, and another 120 staff members work at the complex.

== Restoration ==
In January 2012, the theatre reopened after four and a half years of renovations. Architect Ram Karmi was commissioned to redesign the historic building. More than NIS 100 million was invested in the makeover, which has added 500 square meters of floor space and three new rehearsal rooms. The building's four auditoriums were completely rebuilt. Each is a different size and color: Rovina is blue and seats 930 people; Meskin is lavender and seats 320; Bertonov (also known as Bamartef) is green and seats 220; and Habima 4 (formerly known as Heineken) is wood panelled and seats 170.

== Other theaters ==
- Solomon Stramer's Yiddish theater troupe in Cluj, Transylvania, Romania in the 1920s was also called Habimah.

== See also ==
- List of Israel Prize recipients
