= 6th Montessori School Anne Frank =

Public primary school in Netherlands founded in 1933

- 6e Montessorischool Anne Frank
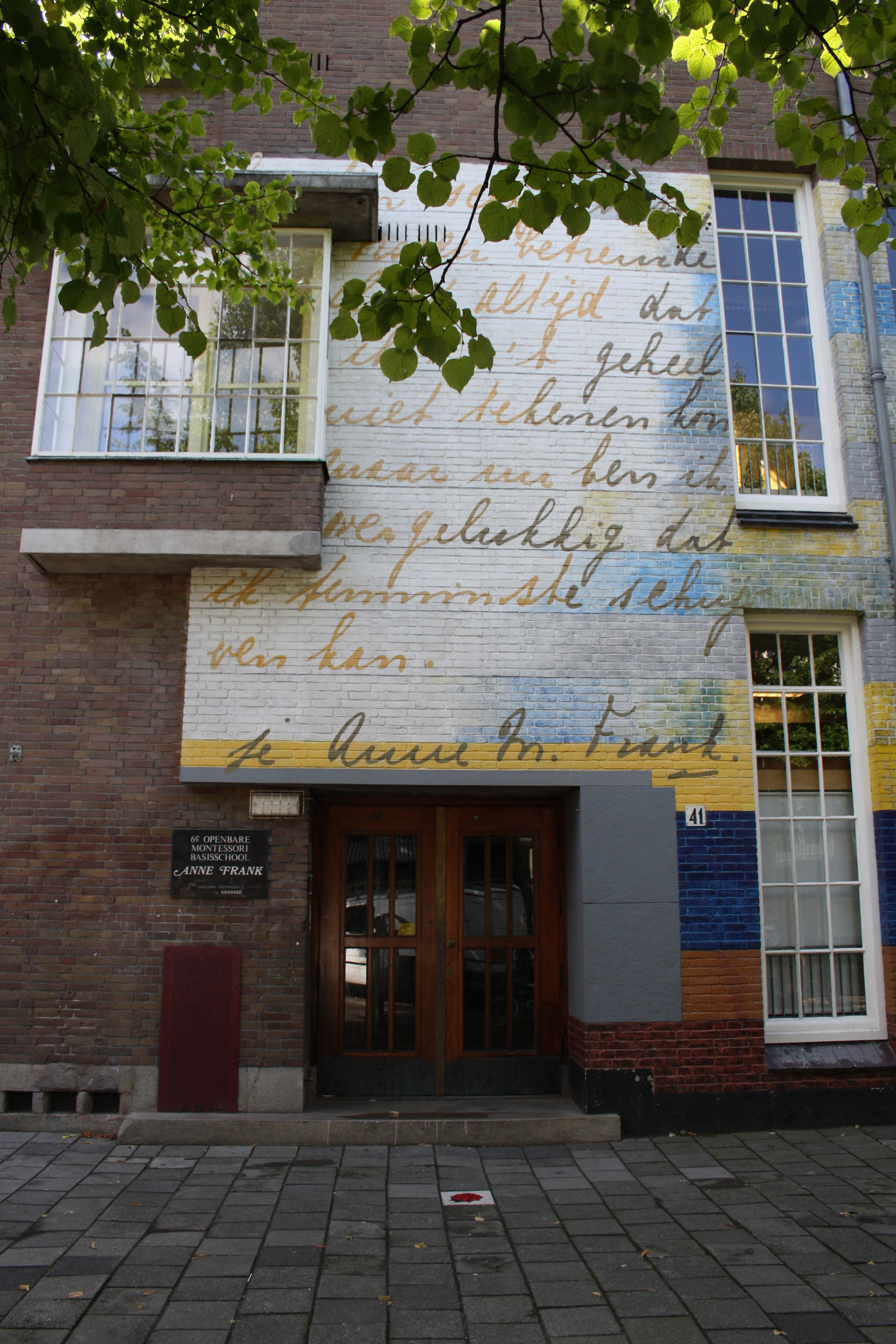
- Entrance of the school in 2010

Location
- Niersstraat 41; 1078 VJ Amsterdam; Netherlands
- Coordinates: 52.3428°N 4.8939°E

Information
- Former name: 6th Montessori School
- Type: public primary school
- Established: 1933
- Director: Katja Rakic
- Enrollment: 350
- Affiliation: Montessori schools
- Website: annefrank-montessori.nl

The 6th Montessori School Anne Frank (Dutch: 6e Montessorischool Anne Frank) (or Anne Frank School (Dutch: Anne Frankschool) for short) is a public Montessori primary school in the Rivierenbuurt, Amsterdam.

== History ==
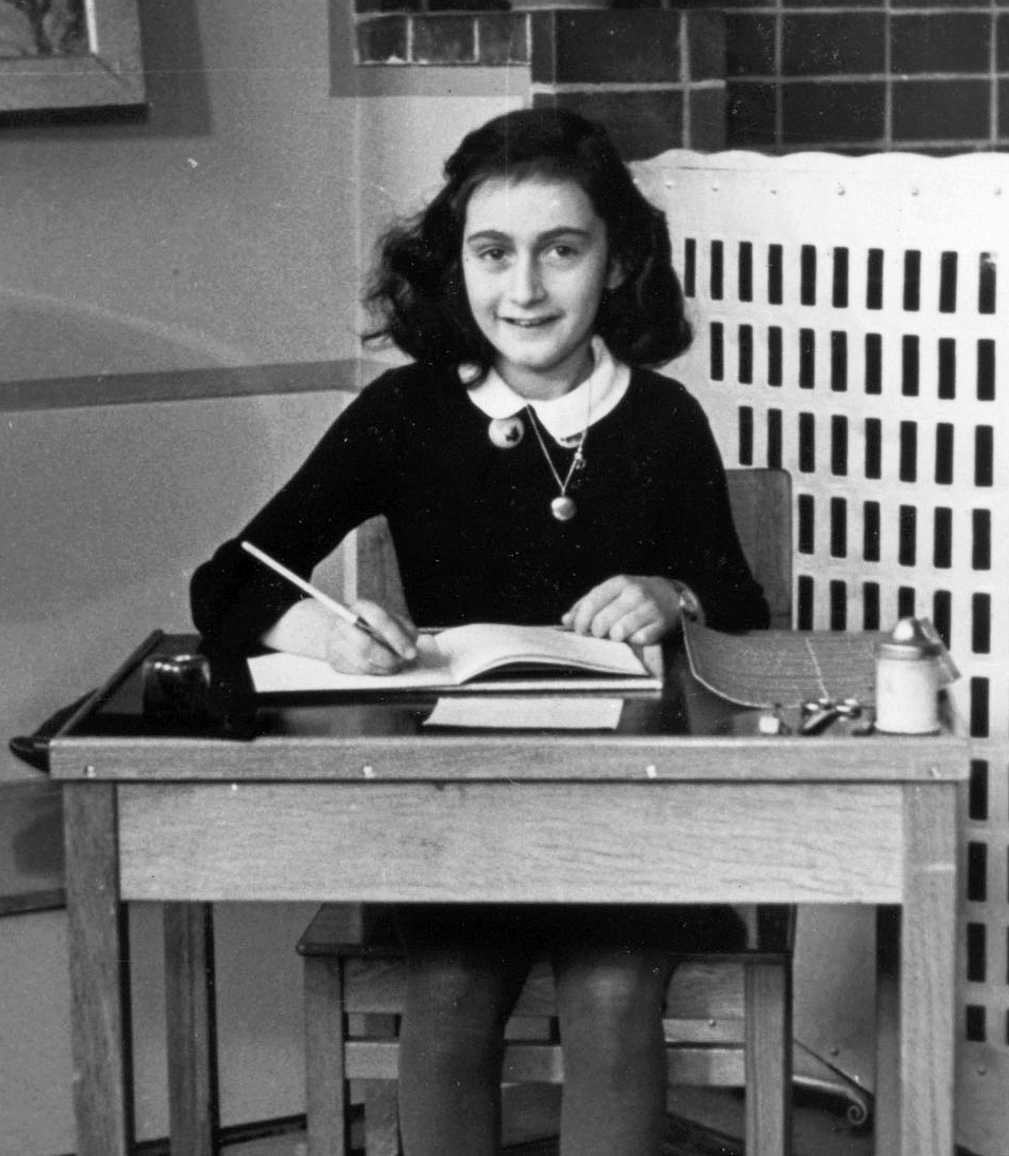
Anne Frank in the 6th Montessori School in 1940

The school was founded in 1933 as the sixth school in the Netherlands according to Maria Montessori's educational methodology. Originally, it was named the 6th Montessori School.

Anne Frank attended the affiliated kindergarten from April 1934, and later attended the school. In her class were also students who, like Anne Frank, had fled Nazi Germany with their families because they were Jewish, among them Hanneli Goslar. During the years of the Nazi occupation of the Netherlands, anti-Jewish measures were enacted and enforced. After the summer vacations of 1941, the occupying forces decreed that the 151 Jewish students had to leave the school and instead go to a Jewish school. Among others, Anne Frank left the primary school in 1941 and continued her education at the Jewish Lyceum.

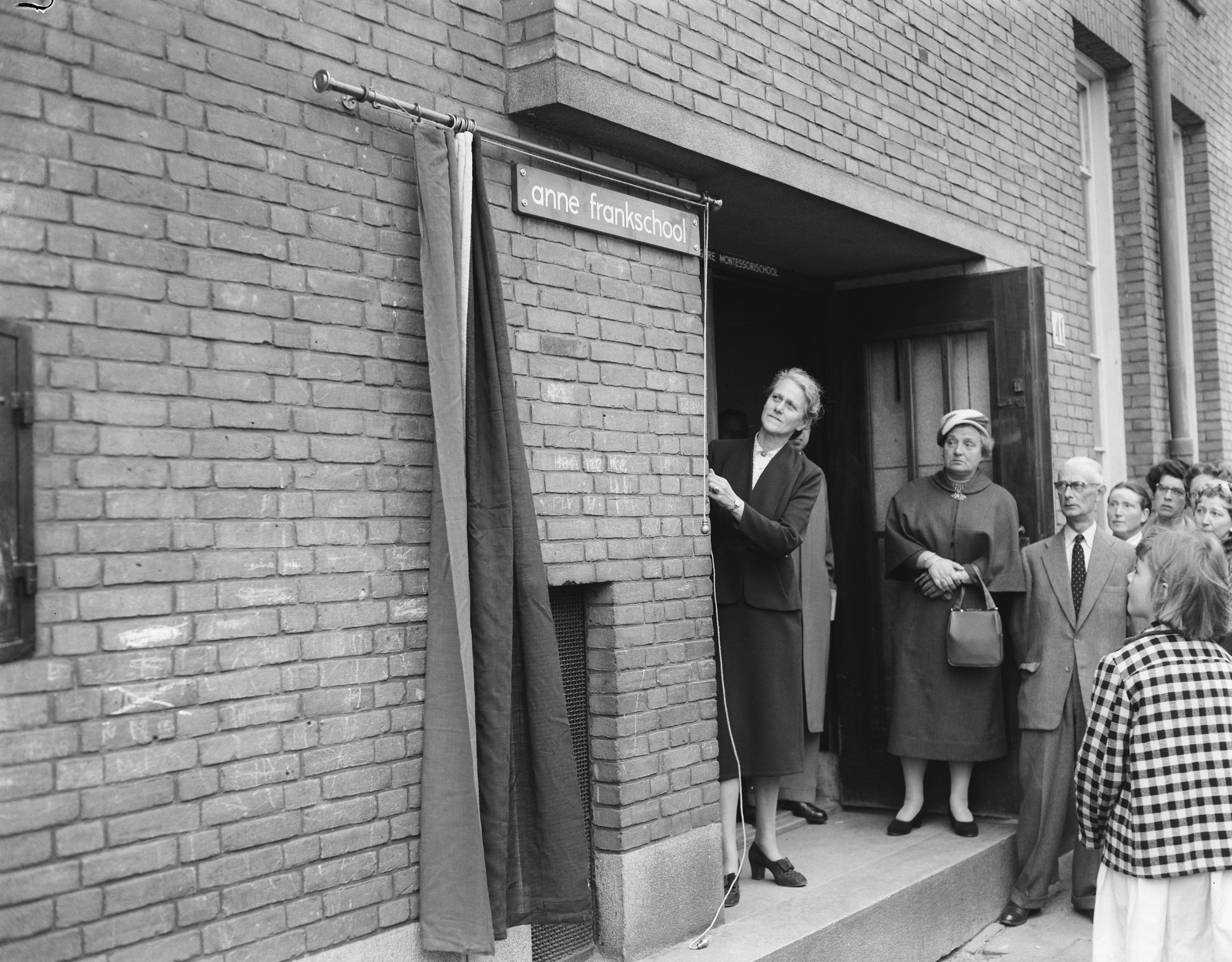
The renaming ceremony in 1957

In 1956, the Anne Frank Committee requested that the Amsterdam municipality rename the school in Anne Frank's memory. In 1957, ten years after Anne Frank's diary had been published, the school was named after Anne Frank.

Artist Harry Visser painted a mural with excerpts from Anne Frank's diary on the school's façade in 1983.

In 1995, the school was remodeled. The classrooms on the first floor were kept in their original state as much as possible. The last classroom also still has an original stove. This was one of the classrooms where Anne Frank had her lessons. In the school there is a memorial plaque in memory of the 130 deported and murdered Jewish children from the school.

== Notable pupils ==
- Anne Frank
- Hannah Pick-Goslar

== See also ==
- List of schools in the Netherlands
- List of schools named after Anne Frank
- List of Montessori schools
