= Alfred Klee =

German lawyer (1875–1943)

- Born: 25 January 1875; Berlin
- Died: 10 November 1943 (aged 68); Westerbork Transit Camp
- Occupation: Lawyer
- Relatives: Hannah Pick-Goslar (granddaughter); Simon Rawidowicz (son-in-law)

Alfred Klee (25 January 1875 – 10 November 1943) was the younger associate of Theodor Herzl and one of the earliest leaders of German Zionism.

== Zionist leader ==
As a young man in Berlin, he was a pioneer of the Zionist movement. He counted Theodor Herzl and Max Nordau among his close friends. He became a prominent spokesperson for the movement in its early days, being known for his oratorical abilities. He held numerous positions across the movements, such as co-founder of the Jüdische Volkspartei in 1919 and the Vice-President in the Berlin Jewish community. He was also the elected representative of the Berlin Kehillah to the Council of the Jewish Colonization Association (JCA or ICA), which aimed to find refuge for Jewish people and improve the conditions of populations already living in refuge.

== Lawyer ==
Alfred Klee earned his doctorate from the University of Tübingen in 1902. In Berlin he practiced in a law firm together with Sammy Gronemann, Fritz Simon, and Hermann Lelewer. He specialised in criminal law, especially cases involving Jewish honour. He is most noted in this respect for winning the libel case against Count von Reventlow and his support for The Protocols of the Elders of Zion.

== Political views ==
In his book Between Jew and Arab: The Lost Voice of Simon Rawidowicz, David N. Myers notes that:

"As a German Zionist of the first generation, Klee did not conceive of his commitment to Zionism as inconsistent with his support for social and cultural work in the Diaspora. Indeed, there were more than a few Zionists such as Klee who rejected the principle of “negating the Exile” and saw Jewish life outside of Palestine less as a permanent state of exile than as a venue replete with creative possibilities."

== Death ==
He died at Westerbork concentration camp in Holland in 1943.

== See also ==
- Hannah Pick-Goslar, granddaughter, friend of Anne Frank
- Simon Rawidowicz, son-in-law, Jewish philosopher
