= Hannah Pick-Goslar =

Close friend of Anne Frank (1928–2022) and Holocaust survivor

- חנה פיק-גוסלר
- Portrait of Hannah Pick-Goslar in the Anne Frank House in October 2012, photographed by Cris Toala Olivares
- Born: Hanna Elisabeth Goslar; 12 November 1928; Tiergarten, Berlin, Germany
- Died: 28 October 2022 (aged 93); Jerusalem, Israel
- Other name: Hanneli
- Education: 6th Montessori School; Montessori Lyceum Amsterdam
- Occupation: Nurse
- Known for: Friendship with Anne Frank
- Spouse: Walter Pinchas Pick
- Children: 3
- Relatives: Simon Rawidowicz (uncle-in-law); Alfred Klee (maternal grandfather)

Hannah Elisabeth Pick-Goslar (Hebrew: חנה פיק-גוסלר; born Hanna Elisabeth Goslar; 12 November 1928 – 28 October 2022) was a German-born Israeli nurse and Holocaust survivor who was a close friend of Anne Frank. The girls attended the 6th Montessori School (renamed after Anne Frank in 1957) in Amsterdam and then the Jewish Lyceum. During the Holocaust, they saw each other again whilst imprisoned at Bergen-Belsen concentration camp. Goslar and her young sister were the only family members who survived the war, being rescued from the Lost Train. Both emigrated to Israel, where Hannah worked as a nurse for children. They shared their memories as eyewitnesses of the Holocaust.

== Early life ==
Hannah Elisabeth Goslar was born in Berlin-Tiergarten, on 12 November 1928, the eldest child of Hans Goslar and Ruth Judith Klee. Her father was deputy minister for domestic affairs, and the ministry's chief of public relations (Leiter der Pressestelle) in Germany until 1933, and her mother was a teacher. Both of her parents were observant Jews.

In 1933, after the election of Hitler and the Nazi Party to the Reichstag and Hitler's appointment as Chancellor, Hans Goslar was forced to resign his governmental job. After an abortive attempt to move to England, where he could not find work that would allow him to stay home on Shabbat, the Goslars moved to Amsterdam, Netherlands, in 1933.

The Goslar family lived close to the Frank family, and she met Anne when both girls went shopping for groceries with their mothers in 1934. Both girls attended the 6th Montessori School and became best friends, Hannah being called Hanneli by Anne. Later, they attended the Amsterdam Jewish Lyceum. They were also close friends with Susanne "Sanne" Ledermann, who lived in the same area but attended a different school, and later with Ilse Wagner and Jacqueline van Maarsen.

In the diary, Anne described Hannah's house as a great sight to see. Anne mentioned that Hannah was a shy girl who was usually reserved and quiet, but would speak her thoughts too. It is also listed in the diary, that Ilse Wagner was considered to be Hannah's best friend. After the release of a 2021 movie based on Anne and Hannah's friendship, confusion rose in the media, but was later explained that Hannah thought of Anne as her best friend, and Ilse thought of Hannah as her own best friend. After Frank has a dream of "Hanneli" in suffering and asking for help from Anne in Frank's Diary of a Young Girl. Frank adds multiple entries, elaborating how she feels empathy for her friend in captivity. Hannah’s sister Rachel Gabriela Ida ("Gabi" or "Gigi") was born in Amsterdam on 25 October 1940. Her mother died in 1942 giving birth to her third child; the baby boy also died.

== Arrest and concentration camp ==
In June 1943, Hannah, her father, her maternal grandparents, and her younger sister were arrested and sent to the Westerbork transit camp, where her grandfather died in November 1943 of a heart attack. The family was taken to Bergen-Belsen concentration camp in February 1944. Hannah was in a privileged section of the camp because her family had Mandatory Palestine papers and Paraguayan passports with them. Thus, they were eligible for prisoner exchanges. Sometime between January and February 1945, she was briefly reunited with Anne Frank, who was a less privileged prisoner at the other side of the camp. After the war Hannah said she spoke to Auguste Van Pels through the fence, finding out that Anne was on the other side. Hannah threw a package with some food over the barbed wire fence for Anne, but another prisoner caught it and did not give it to Anne. Hannah came to the fence one more time a few days later with a package with some bread and socks in it over a hay-filled barbed wire fence dividing the two sections. Hannah and Anne had three total meetings. The meeting at which Anne eventually caught the package was the last time Hannah ever saw her.

Hans Goslar died on 25 February 1945, and his mother-in-law, Therese Klee, on 25 March 1945. Hannah and her sister survived fourteen months at Bergen-Belsen. They were rescued along with the other survivors of the Lost Train. The sisters, sick and undernourished, found temporary refuge in the home of the mayor of Schilda.

== Later life and death ==
Russian authorities allowed Americans to register Goslar and her sister at the end of June 1945, and they returned to Amsterdam. She was hospitalized until the end of September, and sent to Switzerland for recovery in a sanitarium in December. She then finished school in Basel. In May 1947, she received a certificate to go to Mandatory Palestine, where she arrived on 30 May. She lived there for the first three months in a home for children, working for half of the day, and learning Hebrew the other half, which was required to begin training to be a nurse. She began the training in Jerusalem to be a nurse for children in October, and worked as a nurse at the Bikkur Holim Hospital.

Goslar married Dr. Walter Pinchas Pick; the couple had three children and settled in Jerusalem. She had eleven grandchildren and more than 31 great-grandchildren. She returned to places in Germany, also with her sister, and told students about her memories of the Holocaust. She supported the German initiative Zeichen gegen Rassismus und Antisemitismus, planting a tree in memory of Anne and the Anne Frank tree in Uedelhoven in 2019. She was an eyewitness in the Zeitzeugen association.

Pick-Goslar died at her home in Jerusalem, Israel on 28 October 2022, at age 93, just two weeks before her 94th birthday.

== Legacy ==
Pick-Goslar was featured in several documentaries related to Anne Frank, first in the 1988 Emmy Award winning documentary by Willy Lindwer, Laatste Zeven Maanden van Anne Frank (The Last Seven Months of Anne Frank). She helped with information for the 1995 documentary Anne Frank Remembered and the 2008 documentary Classmates of Anne Frank. The 1997 book Memories of Anne Frank: Reflections of a Childhood Friend, by Holocaust author Alison Leslie Gold, is based upon extensive interviews with Hannah. The 2009 television film Mi Ricordo Anna Frank is based on this book.

A fictionalized account of Pick-Goslar's life and close friendship with Anne Frank, titled My Best Friend Anne Frank, was released in 2022.

In 2023, Pick-Goslar’s long-awaited memoir My Friend Anne Frank: the Inspiring True Story of Best Friends Torn Apart and Reunited Against All Odds (with Dina Kraft) was published by Little Brown. While working on this memoir, Pick-Goslar said that Anne Frank would not have written her famously quoted line after being imprisoned in the Bergen-Belsen concentration camp where Anne died ("In spite of everything, I still believe that people are good at heart").

== See also ==
- People associated with Anne Frank
- The Holocaust
- German invasion of The Netherlands
