= Sammy Gronemann =

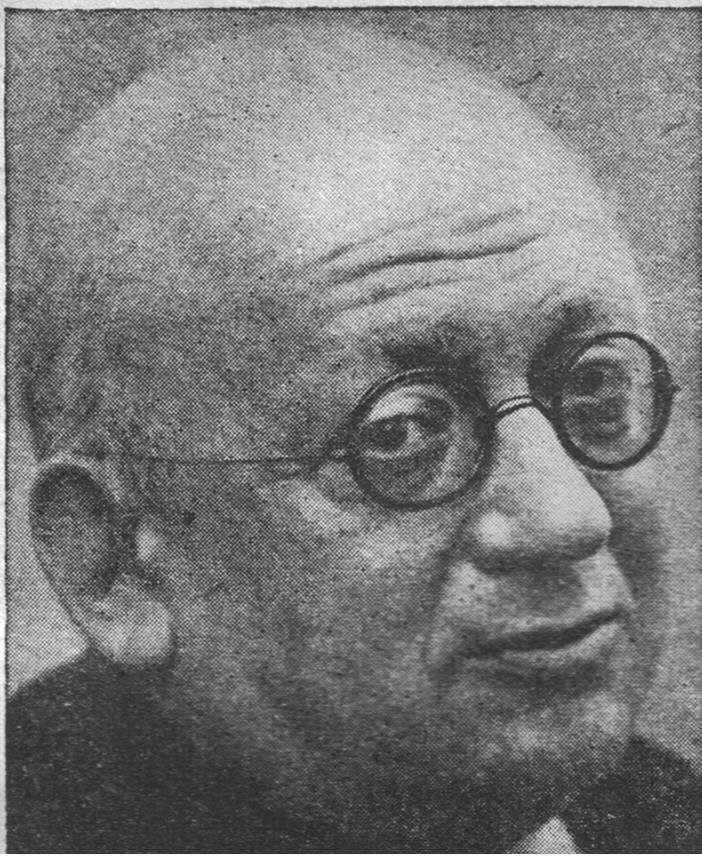
- Sammy Gronemann, 1945
- Born: Samuel Gronemann; 21 March 1875; Strasburg, West Prussia, German Empire
- Died: 6 March 1952 (aged 76); Tel Aviv, Israel
- Resting place: Nahalat Yitzhak Cemetery
- Occupations: Lawyer, writer, playwright, satirist
- Spouse: Sonja Gottesmann (m. 1902, died 1936)
- Relatives: Elfriede Bergel-Gronemann (sister)
- Writing career
- Language: German
- Notable works: Tohuwabohu; Der Weise und der Narr

Sammy (Samuel) Gronemann (21 March 1875 – 6 March 1952) was a German-Jewish lawyer, Zionist official, satirist, and playwright. Born in Strasburg, West Prussia (today Brodnica, Poland), the son of the chief rabbi of Hanover, he was trained first in Talmud and then in law, and practiced for years as an attorney in Berlin.

Within the Zionist movement, he was best known as its senior judge. He founded and chaired the Court of Honour from 1911 and served as chief judge of the Zionist Congress Court from 1921 until 1947. In this role he earned a reputation as what one scholar calls the "institutionalized conscience" of the movement.

Gronemann was a leading contributor to the satirical Zionist magazine Der Schlemiel. He drew on his First World War service among the Jews of Eastern Europe to write the bestselling satirical novel Tohuwabohu (1920).

After fleeing Nazi Germany for Paris in 1933 and immigrating to Mandatory Palestine in 1936, he settled in Tel Aviv and turned to writing for the Hebrew stage. His comedy Der Weise und der Narr, in Nathan Alterman's translation, became King Solomon and Shalmai the Cobbler, described as one of the most successful plays in the history of the Israeli theater.

== Early life and family ==
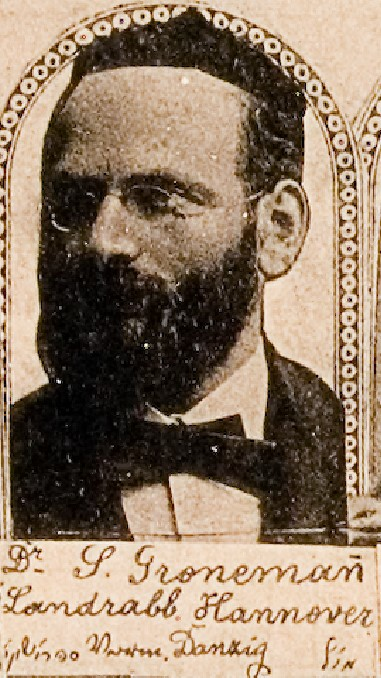
Gronemann's father, Rabbi Selig Gronemann

Gronemann was born on 21 March 1875 in Strasburg in West Prussia (today Brodnica, Poland), the son of Rabbi Selig Gronemann (1843–1918) and his wife Helene, née Breslau (1849–1924), who came from a Russian-Jewish family. His father, a representative of Neo-Orthodox Judaism who had studied at the Jewish Theological Seminary of Breslau, served as the chief rabbi of Hanover, and the family moved there in 1886. His sister, Elfriede Bergel-Gronemann (1883–1958), was a Zionist writer.

In 1902 he married Sonja, née Gottesmann (1877–1936). The couple had no children, and Sonja died in an accident in Tel Aviv in 1936. After her death, Gronemann lived with his sister Elfriede and her husband, Salo Bergel.

== Education ==
Gronemann passed his Abitur (German matriculation exam) at the Lyzeum II in Hanover in 1894. He was exposed to considerable antisemitic hostility at the school. Gronemann recalled in his memoirs that the future poet Börries von Münchhausen, a pupil a year ahead of him, took his side against the hostility.

He spent the following year studying Talmud at the Klaus in Halberstadt, then in 1895 entered Esriel Hildesheimer's Rabbinical Seminary in Berlin. He left without completing his rabbinical training and instead studied philosophy and law at the University of Berlin, passing the first state examination in law in 1898.

== Legal career ==
After passing the first state law examination in 1898, Gronemann completed his legal clerkship at the Amtsgericht (district court) in Nienburg and in 1900 was posted as a public prosecutor (Staatsanwalt) in Hanover, representing the state in criminal proceedings.

He passed the assessor examination, the second state law examination, in 1904, sitting it on the day of Theodor Herzl's funeral, a coincidence to which he attached lasting personal significance. He had represented Herzl, the founder of political Zionism, in the latter's dispute with the rival Zionist Davis Trietsch. In 1906 Gronemann moved to Berlin, where from 1907 he ran his own practice specializing in family, international, and copyright law, in a firm with the Zionist leader Alfred Klee, Fritz Simon, and Hermann Lelewer.

In 1909 Gronemann co-founded the Schutzverband deutscher Schriftsteller (Association for the Protection of German Writers) and served as its legal counsel (Syndikus) until 1933. Several of his most prominent cases concerned literary censorship and the defense of writers. In February 1921, acting for the Schutzverband, he challenged the Berlin public prosecutor's seizure of the book edition of Arthur Schnitzler's play Reigen. On behalf of the Zionist Organization, he defended the cultural-Zionist essayist Ahad Ha'am in 1923 against the antisemitic politician Ernst zu Reventlow, who had claimed that Ahad Ha'am was the author of The Protocols of the Elders of Zion. In 1926–27 he acted for the Austrian playwright and poet Richard Beer-Hofmann in a dispute with the Habima theater, then a touring Hebrew-language company performing during its Berlin residencies of 1926–1931, years before it settled permanently in Tel Aviv.

== Zionism and the Zionist courts ==
Gronemann became active in the Zionist movement at the turn of the century. In 1900 he took part in a Zionist delegates' conference in Berlin, and in 1901 he led the movement's local chapter in Hanover. He attended most of the Zionist congresses from 1907 onward. From 1907 to 1911 he served on the Greater Actions Committee (Großes Aktionskomitee) of the World Zionist Organization, and in 1919 he was a founding member of the Jüdische Volkspartei (Jewish People's Party).

Gronemann's most enduring role in the movement was judicial. In 1911 he founded and chaired the Zionist Court of Honour (Ehrengericht), which he led until 1933. From 1921 he served as chief judge of the Supreme Zionist Congress Court, the movement's highest internal tribunal, an office he held until he declined re-election in 1947. Across more than two decades on the bench he was a central figure in shaping the pre-state Zionist judiciary.

His standing in the movement became proverbial. David Remez, later one of the signatories of Israel's Declaration of Independence and among its first government ministers, quipped that a man could be called a Zionist only if he met two conditions. He had to have paid his shekel, the Zionist membership due, and to have known Gronemann.

Among his final acts as judge, in 1947, was a drafted proposal, the "Regulation of the Political Situation," which advocated a binational solution in Palestine.

== World War I and the Eastern encounter ==
During the First World War, Gronemann served in the German army and rose to the rank of non-commissioned officer. From 1915 to 1918 he worked as a soldier and translator in the press department of Ober Ost, the German military administration of the occupied East, stationed at Kaunas and Vilnius. There he came into close contact with the Jews of Eastern Europe and belonged to a circle of German-Jewish intellectuals in occupied Kovno that also included the novelist Arnold Zweig and the artist Hermann Struck. The encounter inspired his first and best-known novel, the satirical Tohuwabohu (1920), which sets the perspectives of a German Jew and an Eastern European Jew against one another. Its title takes the Hebrew phrase Tohu wa-bohu from the opening of Genesis, where it denotes the formless chaos preceding creation.

While stationed in Kaunas, Gronemann came to know Joseph Carlebach, who directed the city's Hebrew gymnasium, a school Gronemann described as a thoroughly Hebraist, national-Jewish institution. In his memoir-novel Hawdoloh und Zapfenstreich (1924) he portrayed Carlebach warmly as "a brilliant schoolmaster" who stood among his pupils "not like a stern preceptor, but like an older friend and comrade." He also recounted how Carlebach barred the singing of "Hatikvah" on school premises after a Hanukkah celebration, only to rise a year later and lead the assembly in the anthem himself, a turnabout Gronemann recalled with evident approval.

== Emigration and Palestine ==
After the Nazi seizure of power, Gronemann fled to Paris in 1933, where he helped re-establish the Zionist organization in exile. He founded its local branch Ost und West ("East and West") and presided over its German committee. Between 1934 and 1937 he traveled across Europe as an itinerant Zionist speaker on behalf of the Jewish National Fund and the Keren Hayesod (United Israel Appeal). He immigrated to Mandatory Palestine in 1936 and settled in Tel Aviv.

Unable to continue practicing law, Gronemann worked in Mandatory Palestine as an arbitrator alongside former colleagues who were also displaced. He was active in a German-language literary salon and devoted himself increasingly to writing for the stage. In 1944–45 he lectured in adult education, and in 1948–49 he hosted a radio program on Kol Yisrael.

== Theater and the Israeli stage ==
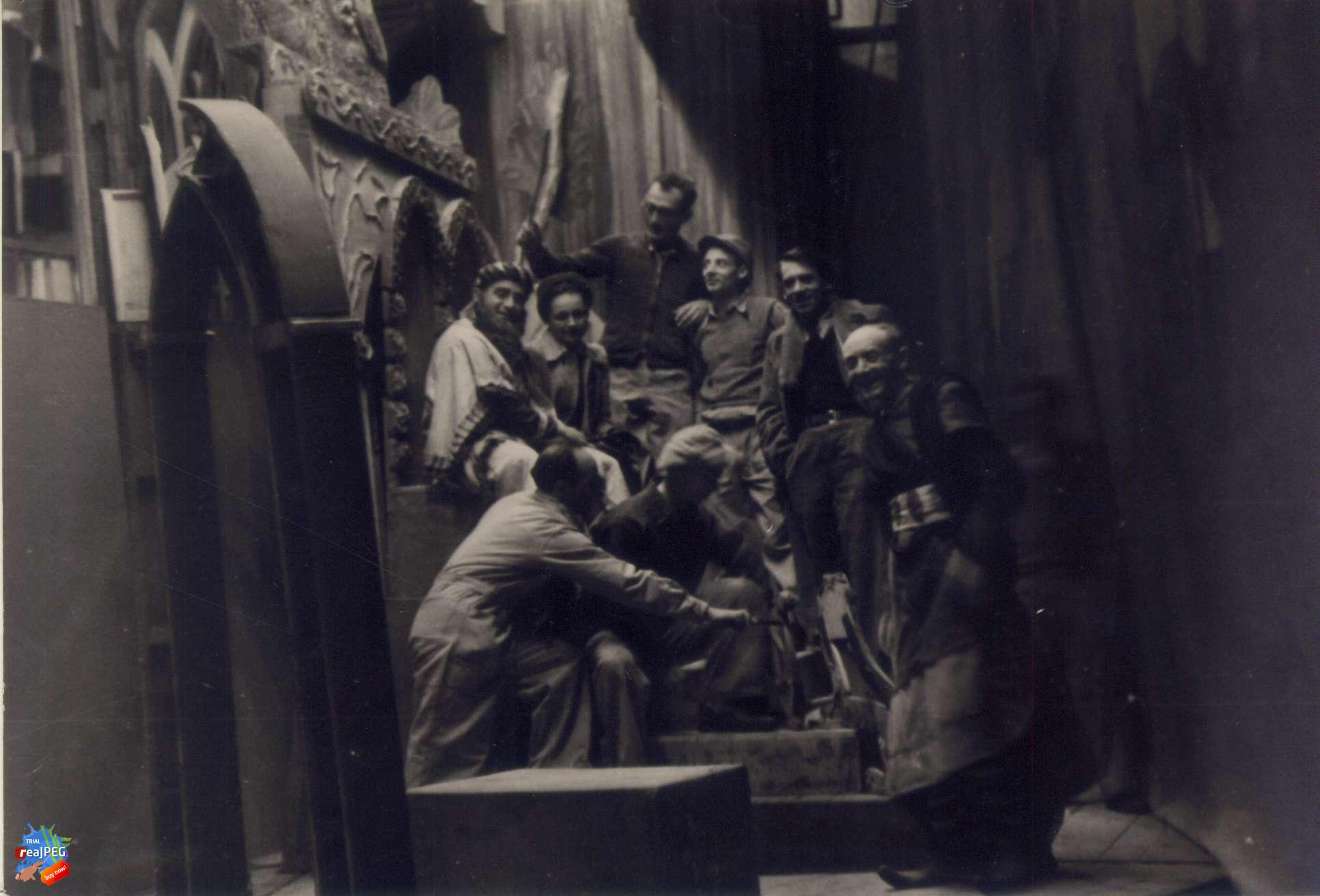
A scene from the 1943 Ohel production of King Solomon and Shalmai the Cobbler, photographed by Kurt Triest

Gronemann had begun writing for the stage in Germany. His Purim play Hamans Flucht ("Haman's Escape"), which scholars connect with Martin Buber's Purim writings, was published in 1926. It was in Palestine, however, that he became a prolific comic dramatist, and his plays were staged by the leading Hebrew companies, including HaMatateh, the Ohel, Habima, and the Cameri.

His comedy Jakob und Christian (1937), a satire of Nazi racial theory turning on two babies swapped at birth, was produced almost simultaneously by HaMatateh in Tel Aviv and at the Jüdische Volkstheater in Vienna, his first international success.

His best-known work was Der Weise und der Narr (1942), translated by Nathan Alterman as King Solomon and Shalmai the Cobbler. It was first staged as a drama at the Ohel in 1943, directed by Moshe Halevy with music by Emanuel Pugatchov, and was turned into a celebrated musical at the Cameri Theatre in 1964, with songs by Alterman set to music by Sasha Argov. Kühne calls the work "the first milestone of comedy-drama in modern Hebrew theater", and it became one of the most successful plays in the history of the Israeli stage, though Gronemann himself, in Kühne's words, "disappeared almost completely behind the name of his translator".

Among his later plays were The Heine Family (Habima, 1947), translated by Avigdor Hameiri, on the baptism debates surrounding the family of the poet Heinrich Heine, and his final work, The Queen of Sheba (Cameri, 1951), a sequel to King Solomon translated by Haim Hefer that recast the comic contrast as one between European and Oriental Jews.

His blend of Jewish and German comic traditions earned him the nicknames "the Shalom Aleichem of the Jeckes" and "the Aristophanes of the Zionist movement".

== Later years and death ==
Gronemann died of a heart attack at the Danziger Hospital in Tel Aviv on 6 March 1952, at the age of 76, and was buried at the Nahalat Yitzhak Cemetery.

In a piece published posthumously in 1953, "Zu meiner Entlastung", Gronemann gave voice to his disappointment with the young State of Israel. He criticized its repressive language policy toward Arabic, Yiddish, and German speaking citizens and what he regarded as a "fascistic" cast of mind, while still hoping that freedom of thought and expression might be realized by a later generation "freed from the dross of exile".

== Legacy ==
King Solomon and Shalmai the Cobbler has remained a fixture of the Israeli theatrical repertoire, although it is now commonly associated with the name of its translator, Nathan Alterman, rather than with Gronemann. A critical edition of his collected writings, the Kritische Gesamtausgabe, has since been published by De Gruyter under the auspices of the Franz Rosenzweig Minerva Research Center at the Hebrew University of Jerusalem, and a 2024 special issue of the journal Naharaim was devoted to his life and work.

== Works ==
Prose

- Tohuwabohu (novel, 1920). English translation: Utter Chaos, trans. Penny Milbouer (Indiana University Press, 2016)
- Hawdoloh und Zapfenstreich: Erinnerungen an die ostjüdische Etappe 1916–18 (memoir-novel, 1924)
- Schalet: Beiträge zur Philosophie des „Wenn schon" (essays, 1927)

Plays

- Hamans Flucht ("Haman's Escape", published 1926)
- Jakob und Christian (1937)
- Der Weise und der Narr ("King Solomon and Shalmai the Cobbler", 1942)
- Der Prozess um des Esels Schatten ("The Lawsuit over the Donkey's Shadow", 1945)
- Heinrich Heine und sein Onkel ("The Heine Family", 1947)
- Die Königin von Saba ("The Queen of Sheba", 1951)

Memoirs

- Zikhronot shel Yeke (Hebrew, translated from German by Dov Sadan, Am Oved, 1946)
- Erinnerungen (Berlin: Philo, 2002)
- Erinnerungen an meine Jahre in Berlin (Berlin: Philo, 2004)
