= Avigdor Hameiri =

Hungarian-Israeli author (1890–1970)

- אביגדור המאירי
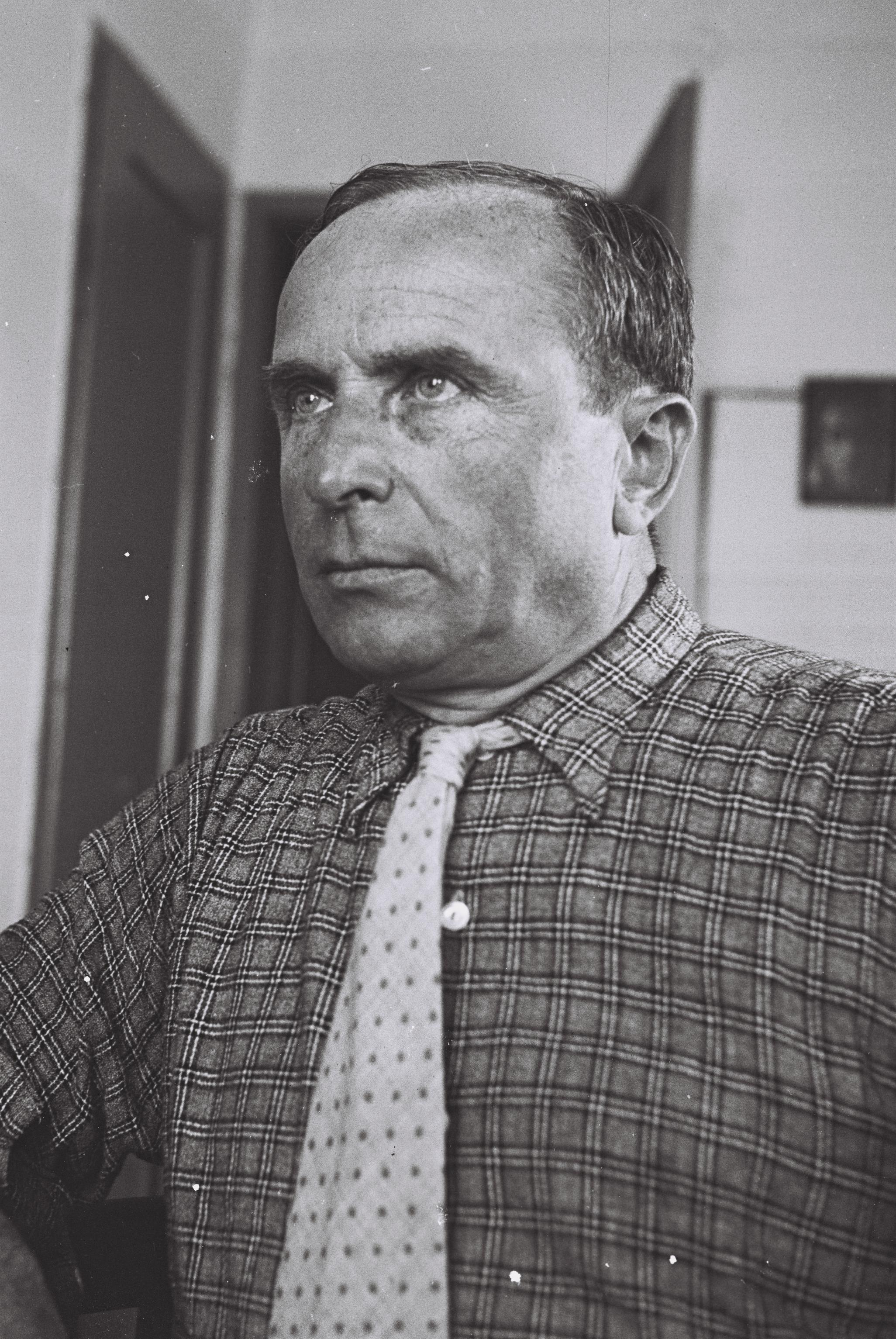
- Hameiri in 1936
- Born: Avigdor Menachem Feuerstein; 16 September 1890; Odavidhaza, Austria-Hungary (now Ukraine)
- Died: 3 April 1970 (aged 79); Israel
- Occupations: Author, poet
- Notable work: The Great Madness (1929); Hell on Earth (1932)
- Awards: Kugel Prize (1962); Israel Prize (1968)

Avigdor Hameiri (Hebrew: אביגדור המאירי; September 16, 1890 – April 3, 1970) was a Hungarian-Israeli author.

== Biography ==
Hameiri was born as Avigdor Menachem Feuerstein in 1890, in the village of Odavidhaza (near Munkatsch), Carpathian Ruthenia in Austria-Hungary. Growing up with his grandfather instilled in him a love for the Hebrew language. Even though the bulk of Hungarian Jewry was still anti-Zionist, he had already developed an admiration for Zionism when he moved to Budapest.

He served in the Austro-Hungarian army along the Eastern front of World War I. Taken prisoner by the Russians during the Brusilov Offensive in 1916, he joined a group of Hebrew writers in Odessa after his release. With their support, he emigrated to Palestine in 1921, and fought in the 1948 War of Independence.

He recorded the events of his war service in his memoirs, The Great Madness (1929) and Hell on Earth (1932). Alon Rachamimov writes that Hameiri's war stories "reveal the degree to which Jewish identification processes could be contextual, angst-ridden, and laden with contradictory tendencies. The extent to which Hameiri was aware of his struggles regarding notions of 'loyalty,' 'fatherland,' and 'patriotism'...illuminate the complexities of collective identification among Habsburg Jews." Gershon Shaked argues that Hameiri's anti-war stance is rooted in his Judaism.

His first book of poetry was published around 1912, while he was still living in Budapest. He published the Israeli State's first independent newspaper and helped to organize the workers' bank. Hameiri was the first poet to whom the title Israel's Poet Laureate was awarded. His books have been published in 12 languages.

Among his translations for the Hebrew stage was Sammy Gronemann's comedy The Heine Family (Heinrich Heine und sein Onkel), produced by the Habima theater in 1947. He died in Israel on April 3, 1970.

== Awards ==
- Kugel Prize awarded by the Municipality of Holon (1962)
- Israel Prize for literature (1968).

== See also ==
- List of Israel Prize recipients

== Bibliography ==
- Abramson, Glenda (2008). Hebrew Writing of the First World War. Valentine Mitchell. ISBN 9780853037705.
  - contains chapters on Uri Zvi Greenberg and Shaul Tchernichovsky as well.
- Rachamimov, A. "Collective Identifications and Austro-Hungarian Jews (1914-1918): The Contradictions and Travails of Avigdor Hameiri", in Laurence Cole and Daniel L. Unowsky (eds), The Limits of Loyalty: Imperial Symbolism, Popular Allegiances, and State Patriotism in the Late Habsburg Monarchy (Oxford, Berghahn Books, 2007), 178-197.
