= Anne Frank School =

Anne Frank School or Anne Frank Elementary School may refer to:

Germany

- Anne-Frank-Gymnasium Aachen
- Anne-Frank-Schule Bargteheide
- Anne-Frank-Gesamtschule (Düren)
- Anne-Frank-Gymnasium Erding
- Anne-Frank-Gymnasium Halver
- Anne-Frank-Realschule Montabaur
- Anne-Frank-Realschule München
- Anne-Frank-Gymnasium Werne

Netherlands

- 6th Montessori School Anne Frank

United States

- Anne Frank Elementary School in Dallas
- Anne Frank Elementary School in Philadelphia
