= Cheder metukan =

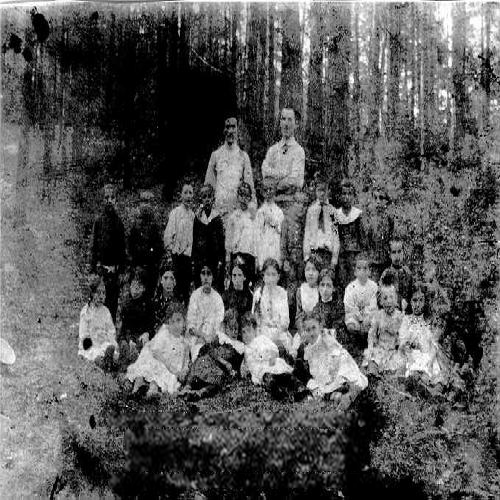
Students of cheder metukan in Trakai, Russian Empire (now in Lithuania), 1911

Cheder metukan Hebrew: חדר מתוקן ("improved cheder", sometimes interpreted as "revised cheder", "progressive cheder" or "reformed cheder" (Note: "Reformed cheder", "progressive cheder": the adjectives "reformed/progressive" here have no association with the Reform/Progressive Judaism) and sometimes transliterated as cheder methukan) was a type of elementary education schools for young Jewish children introduced by the Zionist movement at the break of the 19th and 20th centuries in the Russian Empire (which at that time incorporated considerable parts of Poland and Lithuania (Note: And this tradition continued after the breakup of the Russian Empire after the Russian Revolution of 1917, so it is common to speak about "cheder metukan in Eastern Europe".)) to address the problems of the outdated and inefficient system of traditional cheders. The curricula of the cheder metukan differed depending on the organizer, but the major distinctive features were introduction of the elements of secular education (such as history of the Jews and geography of Eretz Yisrael), "Hebrew through Hebrew" / "Ivrit veIvrit" way of teaching (using Hebrew as the sole medium of teaching), and education for girls. The conservative circles saw this as a threat to their status in the system of education and in the Jewish society, and ardently opposed the introduction of these schools.

== Hebrew through Hebrew ==
This method was based on the following principle:

- In the development of oral speech, the native language ("mame-loshn", i.e., Yiddish) must be completely excluded and the Hebrew words must be associated directly with things or concepts rather that with the words in native language. The grammar must be acquired intuitively, the way as it is acquired in the mother tongue.
- The acquisition of material should occur on the basis of imitation and analogy; the meaning of words and grammatical phenomena should be revealed with the help of visual aids (objects, actions, pictures), i.e., without explanations in the mother tongue.

== Opposition ==
Opponents angrily quipped that they were not cheder mehtukan (חדר מתוקן), but cheder mesukan (חדר מסוכן, "dangerous cheder").

In the autobiography, Chaim Weizmann described the situation as follows:

Another activity which engaged my attention - this was only indirectly related to Zionism - was the agitation for the modernized, improved cheder - the cheder metukan - which sprang up about this time in Russian Jewry. A reform was badly needed, not simply in regard to the accommodations, pedagogy and curriculum, but in regard to the entire attitude toward the elementary education of young children. It was extraordinary that the Jews, with whom the education of their children was a matter of the profoundest concern, paid no attention to the first stages of the education. Any sort of luckless failure in the community was considered good enough to teach children their letters and the word melamed, or teacher, was synonymous with schlimil. <...> The cheder metukan sought to introduce the element of humanism into early studies, with greater emphasis on Hebrew as a living tongue, on the secular aspects of the Jewish tradition, and on wordly subjects, which were considered anathema by the old generation. My enthusiastic support of the new type of cheder got me into the trouble with the ultraorthodox, who threatened to denounce me to the police as an atheist, revolutionary, enemy of God and disturber of the peace.

== Notable persons ==
- Avraham Cholodenko founded the first cheder metukan in Kyiv
- Chaim Weizmann was an active supporter of cheder metukan movement
- David Zakai taught in cheder metukan in the Mogilev Governorate
- Pinchas Perelmn (פנחס געלמאן) (1880-1921), non-Chasidic rabbi of Yekaterinoslav, founded there a cheder metukan (where young Menachem Mendel Schneerson did not go).
- Simon Rawidowicz was a teacher in a cheder metukan in his young years
