= Solomon Stramer =

Solomon Stramer was the leader of a Yiddish theater troupe founded in Vienna, Austria, but based in Cluj, Romania from 1919 at least until the late 1920s. For a time, his troupe had the exclusive right to perform Yiddish-language theater in Transylvania, an area which at that time was home to about 300,000 Jews.

Stramer's troupe, which after a shaky start developed into a solid operetta company, deviated from the usual patterns of Yiddish theater in that he successfully achieved a compromise with many Orthodox Jewish groups who had normally been opposed to Yiddish theater, which they saw as a secularizing force. Stramer's productions even incorporated Hasidic songs.

By 1922, Stramer's troupe had taken the name Teatrul Naţional Evreiesc Habimah (Habimah National Yiddish Theater). They sought, and in March 1922 received, the backing of the Uniune Naţională a Evreilor din Ardeal (National Union of Transylvanian Jews) for the exclusive right to perform Yiddish theater in Transylvania. The Romanian Ministry of Arts chose to back that exclusivity with the force of law: in August 1922, Sara Kanner, widow of Leopold Kanner, was told by the Ministry that she was welcome to perform Yiddish theater anywhere in Romania outside of Transylvania. The exclusive held for several years, and was finally broken around 1926 when an avant-garde Yiddish theater troupe, who were doing a very different type of theater from Stramer's operetta company, were permitted to tour in Transylvania. Solomon Stramer recorded on 78 rpm records for Decca, Victor, and Odeon.
