= Cheder =

Traditional school of Judaism and Hebrew

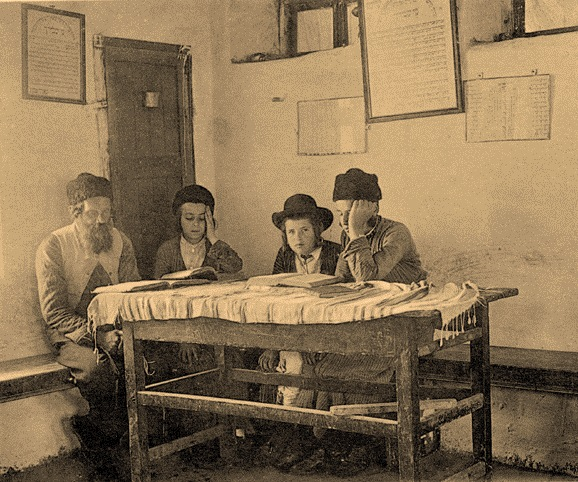
Cheder in Meiron, Sanjak of Acre, Ottoman Empire, 1912

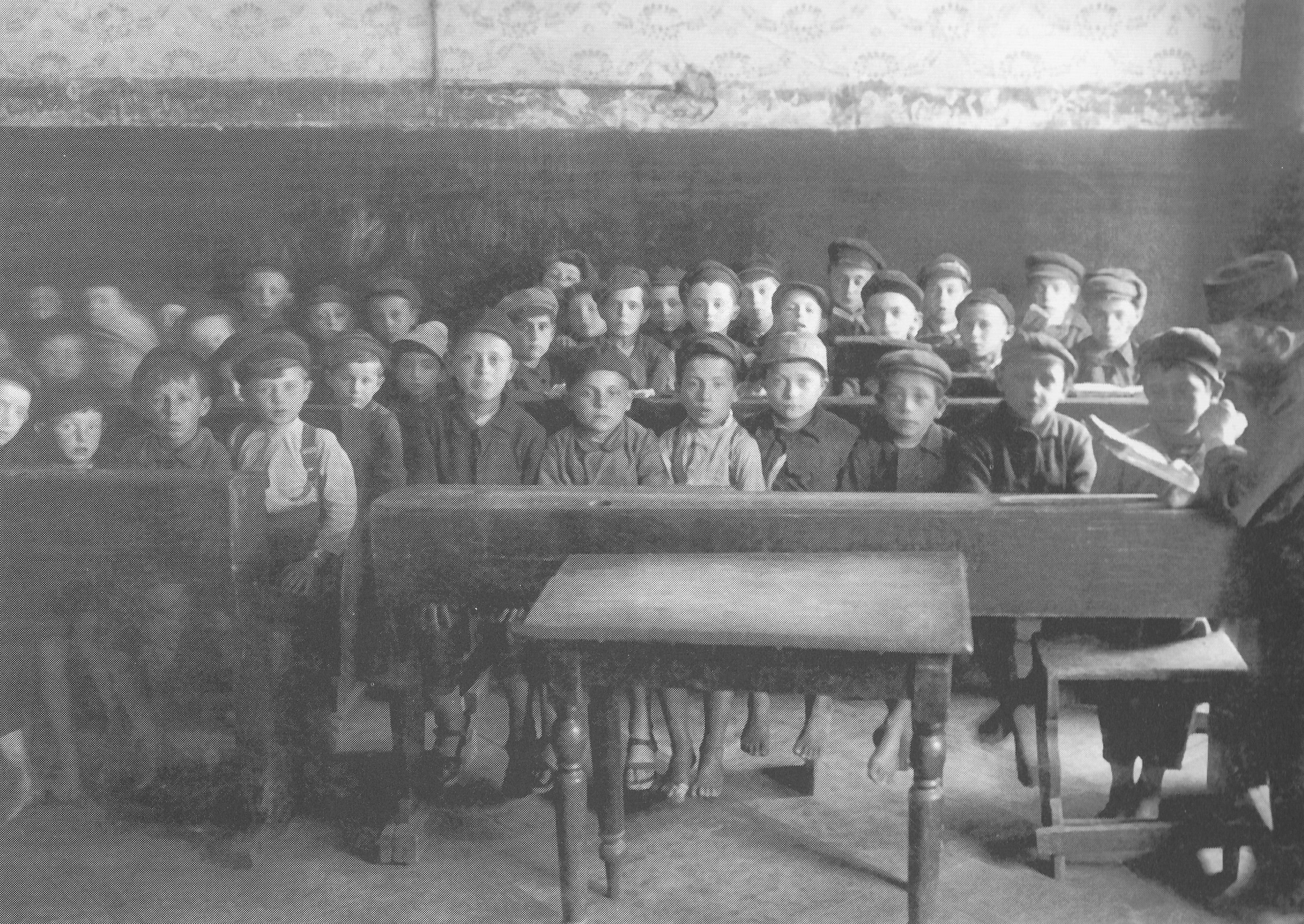
A Cheder in Poland, cca. 1917

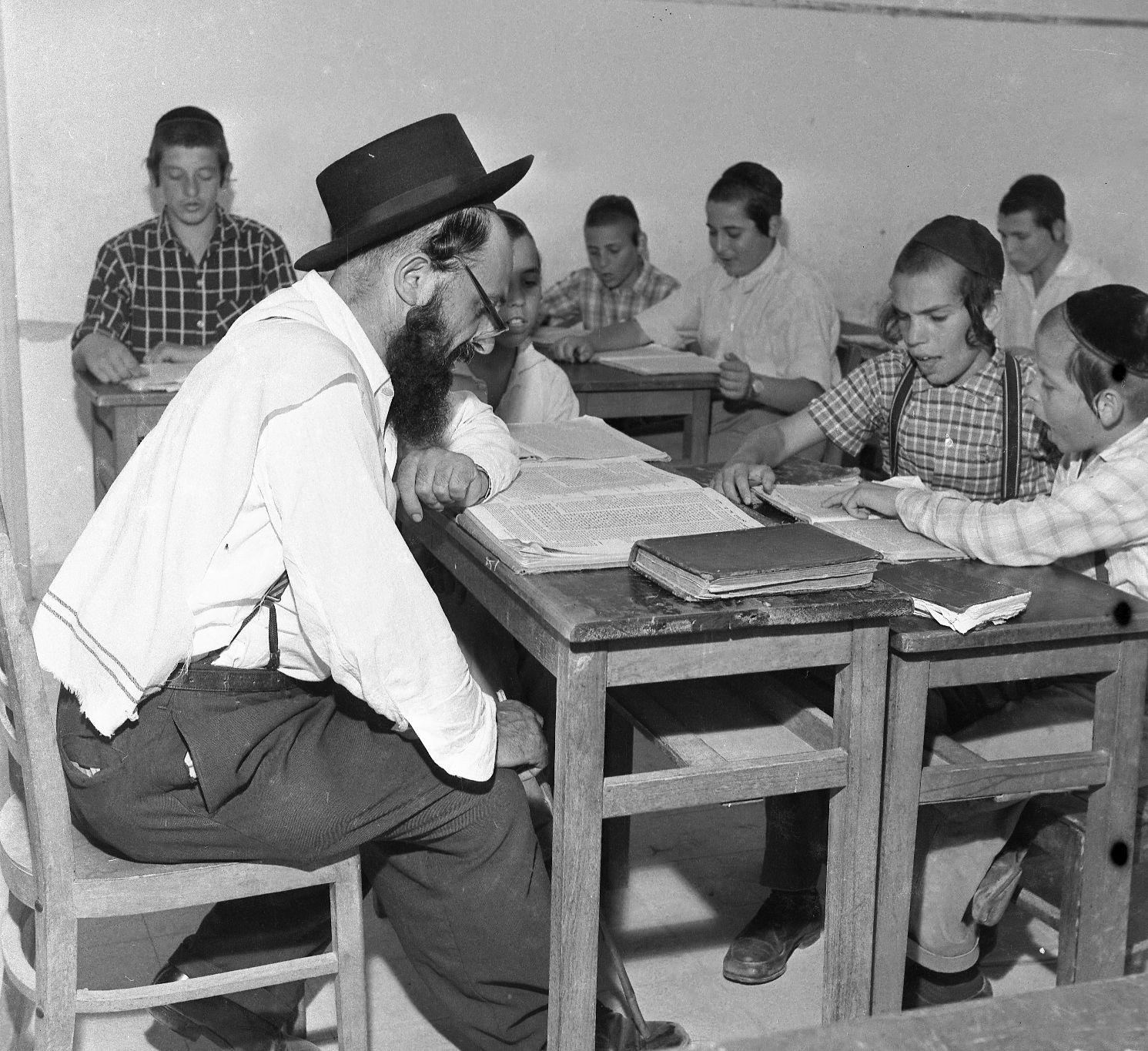
Cheder in Israel, 1965

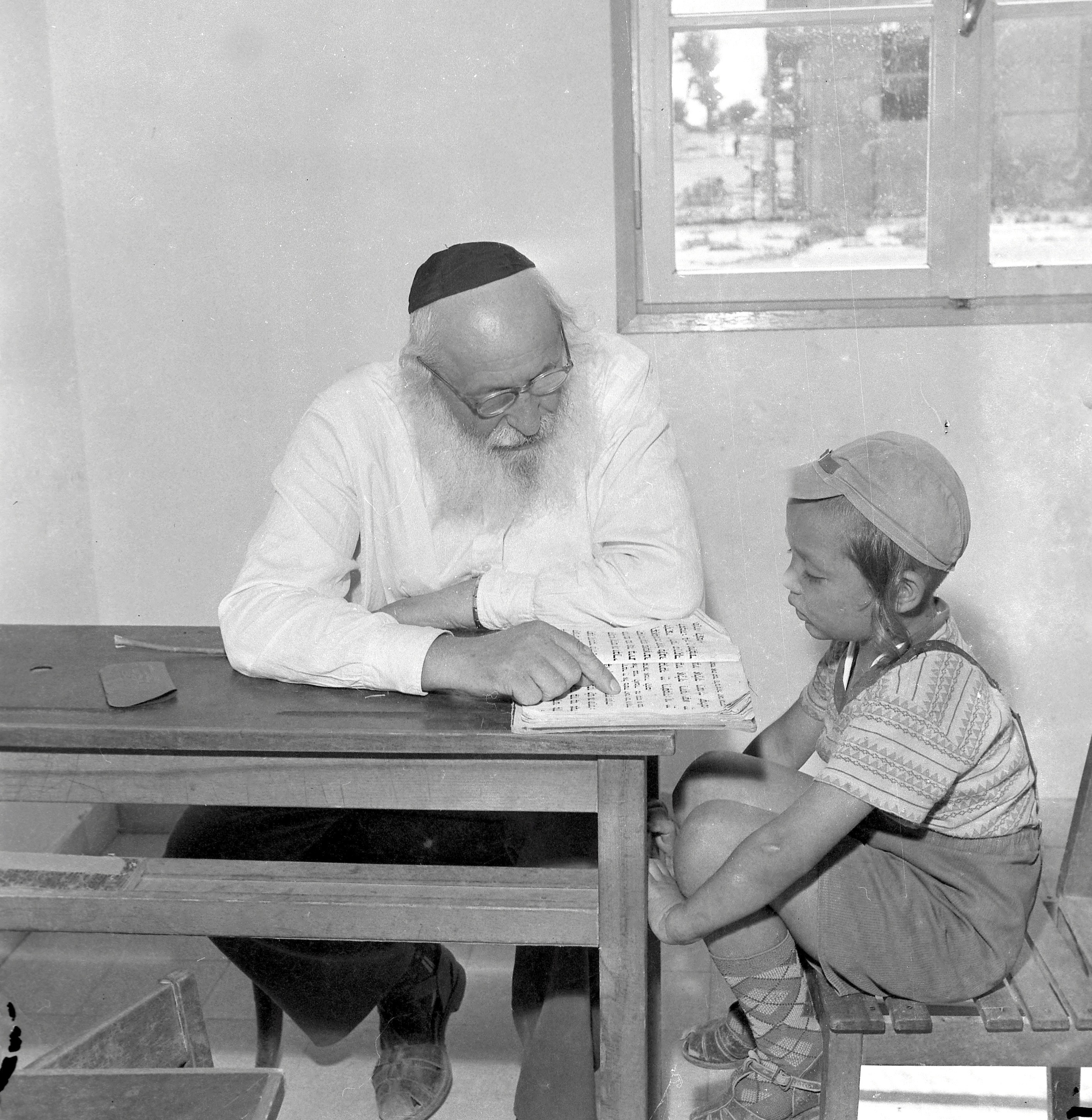
A Cheder in Bnei Brak, Israel, 1965

A cheder (Hebrew: חדר, lit. 'room'; Yiddish pronunciation: [ˈχɛɪdər]) is a traditional primary school teaching the basics of Judaism and the Hebrew language.

== History ==
Cheders were widely found in Europe before the end of the 18th century. Lessons took place in the house of the teacher, known as a melamed, whose wages were paid by the Jewish community or a group of parents. Normally, only boys would attend classes – girls were educated by their mothers in their homes. Where money was scarce and the community could not afford to maintain many teachers, boys of all ages would be taught in a single group.

Although traditionally boys start learning the Hebrew alphabet the day they turned three, boys typically entered cheder school around the age of 5. After learning to read Hebrew, they would immediately begin studying the Torah, starting with the Book of Leviticus. They would usually start learning the Mishnah at around seven years of age and the Talmud (Mishnah, Gemara, and additional commentaries) as soon they had mastered the Mishnah. Reading out loud to each other and rote learning were the main techniques used to teach these complicated studies. At the age of 13 or 14, the end of a boy's education at the cheder would be marked by his bar mitzvah.

Those who wanted to go on to become a rabbi or sofer had to continue their studies at an yeshiva, or Talmudic university. Famous European yeshivot were located at Worms, Fürth and Prague, which was considered to be among the best. After many Jews had fled to eastern Europe to escape medieval pogroms connected with the Crusades of that time, the intellectual centre of European Judaism moved with them and remained there for centuries.

Towards the end of the 18th century, the cheder system became a target of critique by members of Jewish orthodoxy as well as by supporters of the more liberal Haskala (Jewish Enlightenment).

Orthodox critics argued that teachers were not sufficiently qualified. At that time, cheder teachers were paid so badly that many would have to supplement their incomes with menial tasks. It was fairly commonplace for a melamed to be a butcher, singer or even a gravedigger. It was also argued that some melameds would let pupils advance to the next level of learning too early because advanced pupils had to pay more money for their lessons.

Critics committed to the ideals of the Haskala criticized the system as a whole, claiming it resulted in linguistic and spatial isolation for its students and therefore impeded the integration and emancipation of the Jews. They proposed additional lessons in the local language and a more secular vocational education.

These ideas were put into practice at the end of the 18th century by German Jews who founded Reform schools or Freischulen ('free schools'). This and the introduction of compulsory education eventually led to the dissolution of the cheder system, at least in Germanophone countries, although it continued to exist in Eastern Europe until as recently as the Holocaust.

At the break of the 19th and 20th centuries in the Russian Empire (which at that time incorporated considerable parts of Poland and Lithuania), cheder metukan (Hebrew: חדר מתוקן, lit. 'improved cheders') were introduced by the Zionist movement.

== 21st century ==
In more Modern Orthodox Jewish communities in the diaspora, chadarim (plural of cheder) are sometimes attended outside normal school hours. There, Jewish children attending non-Jewish schools can pick up some rudimentary knowledge of the Jewish religion and traditions, learn how to read Hebrew and understand some basic Hebrew vocabulary. In these communities, regular attendance at cheder is often a prerequisite for boys being allowed to read a portion from the Torah for their bar mitzvah, and for girls to participate in a bat mitzvah ceremony that these communities might arrange for them.

Conservative and Reform Jewish communities, which are generally secular and assimilated, might have a similar program, but are more relaxed with regard to what they teach.

In more insular diasporan Orthodox Jewish communities, cheder is a term used to mean a private primary day school where the emphasis is placed on religious study and a secondary emphasis is placed on secular knowledge which is also taught. These are increasingly popular within Haredi communities in Europe and America where a core curriculum is obligatory, so even Haredi schools tend to offer a fairly broad if superficial secular education.

In Israel, where there is no legal core-curriculum, the distinction between school and cheder is rarely made, as most Haredi schools teach only a very rudimentary level of secular knowledge.

== See also ==
- Talmud Torah
