= Maamarim (Chabad) =

Chabad Chassidic discourse

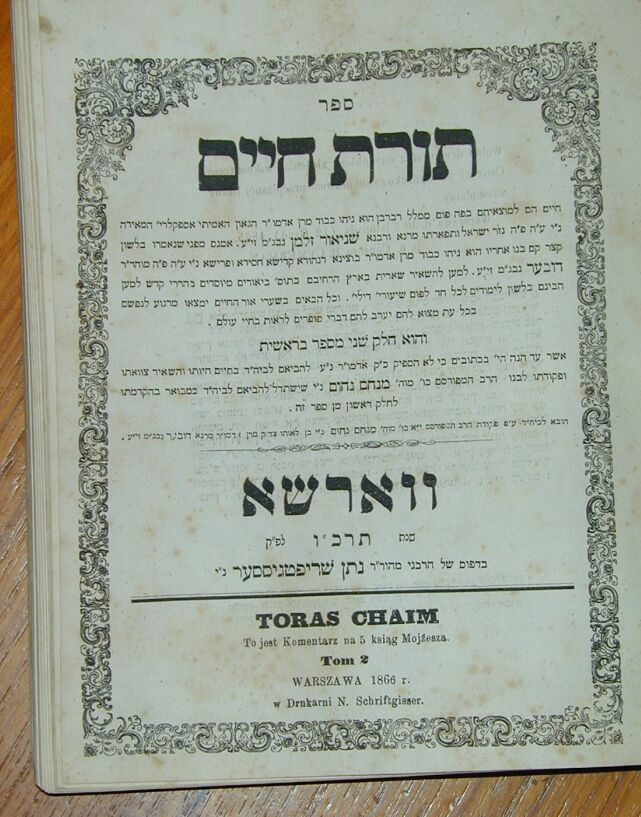
Sefer Toras Chaim, Hasidic Maamarim mystical discourses on the books of Genesis and Exodus by the second Chabad Rebbe, Dovber Schneuri

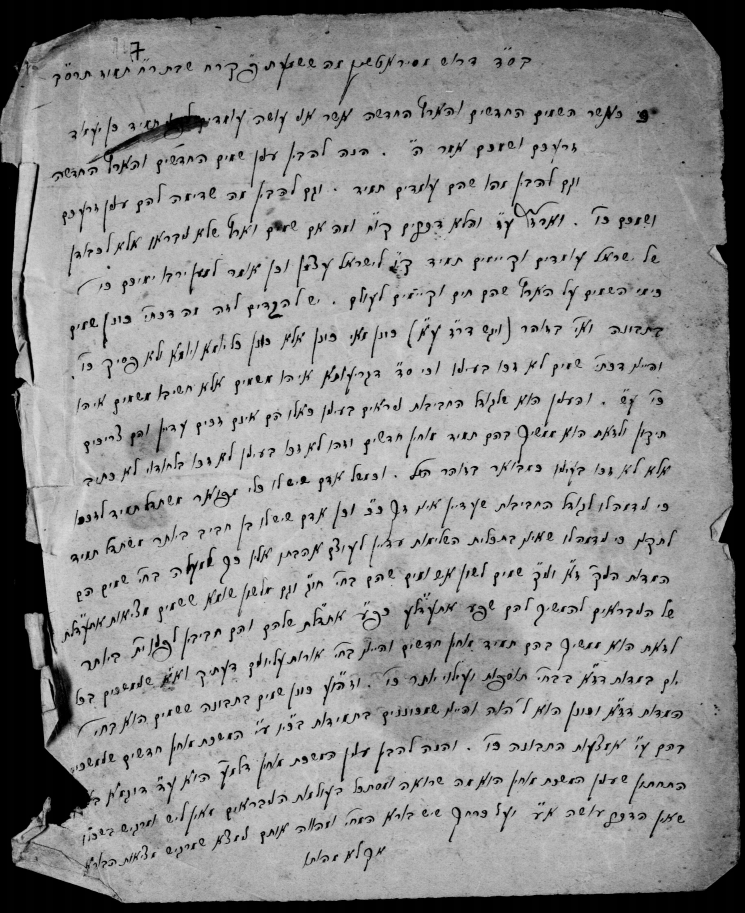
Maamar "כי כאשר השמים החדשים והארץ החדשה" from Rebbe Chaim Schneur Zalman Schneersohn, 1902

Maamarim/Ma'amorim (Hebrew: מאמרים, meaning "Discourses"; singular Maamar, Hebrew: מאמר) in Chabad Hasidism are the central format texts of in-depth mystical investigation in Hasidic thought. In Chabad philosophy, the textual format of the Maamar is used in a great number of published works.

Maamarim were recited by all 7 leaders of the Chabad movement, also known as "Rebbes."

Excluding those recited by the first Rebbe, Shneur Zalman of Liadi, himself, Maamarim build upon the founding intellectual Chabad method of the Tanya by the first Rebbe, each subsequent Rebbe developing the thought in successive stages, to seek broader explanation, communication and application. Chabad texts tend to systematic characterisation and presentation compared to the more homiletical-faith aims of most Hasidic literature.[1] Particular themes of focus emerge in the teachings of each subsequent leader according to the mystical and social circumstances of the times. In the last generation, the 7th Lubavitcher Rebbe, while developing the Maamar in Chabad to its cumulative conclusion, made its in-depth Kabbalistic exegetical method secondary to the newly emphasized Chabad format of informal analytical talks (many published in Likkutei Sichos and Toras Menachem), his central teachings, to enable greatest application of Hasidism to tangible spirituality and outreach. Though Maamarim are usually a self-contained entity, they are sometimes arranged as Kuntreisim studies or collected Sefarim books. Additionally, from the 4th Rebbe onwards, Maamarim often comprise extended Hemsheichim series on a theme.

== Format ==
The main difference between a Maamar and a Sicha, the informal talks which were given by various Rebbes more frequently, which explains all the other differences, is that a Maamar is believed to be divinely inspired, whereas a Sicha (lit. "speech") consisted of the Rebbe's original thoughts on a wide variety of subjects, ranging from the weekly reading of the Torah to current important events.

The Talmud records that a heavenly voice once proclaimed that the opinions of the schools of Hillel and Shammai are both divrei Elokim chayim: “words of the living G‑d” (Eruvin 13b). In Chabad this designation (or the acronym dach) is applied to the rebbe’s delivery of a maamar: The rebbe is the conduit through which G‑d’s word flows.

Chabad Maamarim, especially the more well-known ones, are also usually named after their opening quotation from Scripture, whereas Sichot are generally referenced by the occasion (i.e. day of week, torah portion, or special event) on which they were delivered. Most Maamorim were delivered orally, with a few noteworthy exceptions (many Maamorim of the Te'erav Hemshech were never delivered publicly. Due to a Maamar's perceived holiness, whenever it was known that a Rebbe would deliver a Maamar, his followers would sing one of the specifically designated preparatory melodies, Nigun Hachana, to establish the mood necessary for the delivery of the Maamar. At the conclusion of the melody all present would stand up, and the Rebbe would say the Maamar. The manner of delivery also differed from that of a Sicha in three ways: Besides quotations from other areas of Torah, Maamorim were delivered exclusively in Yiddish; they were sung, not spoken, using the sing-song chant customarily used while studying Talmud; the Rebbe's eyes were closed throughout the Maamar.

== Occasions ==
=== Communal celebrations ===
Despite the constant importance Chabad Chassidim attribute to the study of Maamorim, there are some Maamorim which are studied annually on special occasions in the Chabad calendar.

==== Yud-Tes Kislev ====
On the 19th day of the Hebrew month Kislev 5559 (November 27, 1798) the Alter Rebbe was released from his 53-day-long imprisonment, and subsequently established that day and the next as a day of celebration. During the annual farbrengen (chassidic festive gathering) of Yud-Tes Kislev, the Lubavitcher Rebbe would recite a Maamar starting with the verse Pada V'Sholom Nafshi ("he has redeemed my soul in peace"), Psalms 55:18, which was the verse the Alter Rebbe arrived at in his recitation of Psalms when he was informed of his release. Since the Rebbe's passing, his followers study one of these Maamarim for Yud-Tes Kislev, and someone recites one of them at the farbrengen.

==== Sabbath ====
In many Chabad synagogues and Yeshivas, on Sabbath and holidays, someone is appointed to explain a Maamar discussing a theme from the weekly torah portion and/or upcoming holiday.

==== Rosh Hashana ====
The late Lubavitcher Rebbe would require the person who blew the Shofar (or Baal Tokeah) on the Jewish New Year, to study the Maamar titled "To understand the Idea of Blowing the Shofar" beforehand.

=== Individual celebrations ===
==== Bar Mitzvah ====
In Chabad, when a boy (this custom is not followed by women) approaches his Bar-Mitzvah and/or wedding, it is customary for him to learn a Maamar dealing with topics relevant to the idea of Bar Mitzvah and marriage (respectively). However, on these two occasions, unlike the others, the reciter does not explain the Maamar to the audience in his own words; it is recited verbatim and by heart, preferably in the original Yiddish. The Maamar recited on Bar-Mitzvahs is Isa B'Midrash Tehillim. This discourse was first recited by the fifth Lubavitcher Rebbe, Sholom Dovber Schneersohn, on his Bar Mitzvah, on the 20th of Cheshvan 5634 (November 10, 1873). It deals mainly with the mystical significance of Tefillin, the phylacteries traditionally donned daily by all Jewish males, starting from their Bar Mitzvah. Unlike the maamar recited by the groom, there is no specific time during the ceremony during which the Bar Mitzvah Maamar is to be recited, although it is generally done sometime during the festive meal. Those present do not stand during the recitation, as was the custom when the Rebbe spoke.

==== Wedding ====
Towards the beginning of the wedding ceremony, before the Badeken ceremony, the groom, or Chosson, recites the 5689 (1928) Maamar Lecha Dodi, which the Previous Rebbe, Yosef Yitzchak Schneersohn, recited at the wedding of his daughter Chaya Mushka and son-in-law Menachem Mendel Schneersohn. This maamar establishes a metaphysical connection between greeting the bride and welcoming the Sabbath, and explains the spiritual significance of some of the wedding customs.

==== Circumcision ====
The maamar Be'Etzem Hayom Hazeh, from Torah Or by the Alter Rebbe, is recited at a Bris Milah, the Jewish circumcision ritual, by the father of the infant.

== Hemshechim ==
A Hemshech (Hebrew: המשך; lit. "continuation, series") refers to a series of Maamarim with a common underlying theme. In length, they span anywhere from 5 to 144 discourses, which took anywhere between a few weeks to almost four years to recite and/or write. The most well-known of these are the Hemshechim Samech Vov, Ayin Beis and Ranat of Rabbi Sholom Dovber Schneersohn.

The longest series, Hemshech Ayin Beis, began on Shavuot of 5672 (1911, תרע"ב- hence the name) and lasted until the Parsha of Va'yeira 5676 (1915, תרע"ו), though the Previous Rebbe related that the Rebbe Rashab began toiling in material which would later be the foundations of the series already in 5647 (1886-7), twenty years earlier.

== English bibliography ==
Studies on the successive development in Chabad thought, represented in each Rebbe's Maamarim:

- Holiday Maamarim, translated by Rabbi David Rothschild, distributed by the Kehot Publication Society, 2008, ISBN 978-965-91128-0-7. Two-volume set of 24 Maamarim by the Lubavitcher Rebbes on the holidays.
- Communicating the Infinite: The emergence of the Habad school, Naftali Loewenthal, Chicago University Press 1990, ISBN 0-226-49045-9. Academic study of the distinctive emergence of Chabad from general Hasidism by Shneur Zalman of Liadi, and its methodological clarification between Dovber Schneuri and Aharon HaLevi of Strashelye in the second generation
- The Seven Chabad Lubavitch Rebbes, Chaim Dalfin, Jason Aronson 1998, ISBN 0-7657-6003-7 Anecdotal and sourced study from Habad tradition of the developing nature of thought of each Rebbe
- Heaven On Earth: Reflections on the Theology of Rabbi Menachem M. Schneerson, the Lubavitcher Rebbe, Faitel Levin, Kehot publications 2002, ISBN 0-8266-0488-9. A study of the cumulative development of Chabad thought in the last Rebbe's Atzmus and Dirah Betachtonim theology, contrasted with previous Habad thought. The relation of Hasidism to Mashiach and Atzmus begins to emerge in later Chabad writings, but is embodied fully in the 7th generation

Select classic examples of Maamarim in English translation, published by Kehot Publication Society:
