= Zalman Moishe HaYitzchaki =

Shneur Zalman Moishe HaYitzchoki, usually known familiarly as Reb Zalman Moishe, (c. 1872-3 Shvat, 1952), was an Orthodox Jewish Chabad-Lubavitch Rabbi in pre-war Europe, and towards the end of his life, in the Land of Israel. He served as a Mashpia (Hasidic mentor) and shochet. He was a follower of the Rebbe Rashab and the Rebbe Rayatz.

== Biography ==
Reb Zalman Moishe was born in Nevel, Russia, to his father, Reb Dovber ("Berel Der Shoichet"), who was the Chabad shochet in Nevel. The surname HaYitzchoki indicated their lineage to Rashi. His mother was Rochel Zisselson, the daughter of a prominent Lubavitch family in Nevel. He married Neshe Reines of Zhembin.

After marrying, Reb Zalman Moishe began studying unofficially part-time at the Tomchei Temimim Yeshiva in Zhembin, and this brought him to become intensely devoted to the study of Chabad Chassidus. He would come to attend the lectures on this topic delivered by Reb Shmuel Groinem Esterman, the official Mashpia.

Several years later he moved to Schtzedrin, a small village founded by the Tzemach Tzedek, and populated exclusively by Chabad Chassidim. He accepted the request of the village's inhabitants that he come practice shechita.

After his father died in 1919 he returned to Nevel to replace his father as the city's shochet. He immediately became one of the central personalities in the city, and his home became a centre for Chassidic farbrengens.

In the year 1933 he decided to immigrate to the Holy Land. In order to file his application he moved to Moscow, where he stayed for two years, until his application was accepted in 1935. He then moved to Tel Aviv.

In the early 1940s he suffered partial paralysis, and would spend most of the day studying the Chasidic discourses of the Rebbe Rashab, and praying.

== Personality ==
Reb Zalman Moishe was known for his sharp and even crude style of rebuke during farbrengens. However, those who knew him well understood that the "real" Reb Zalman Moishe was refined and considerate. Nevertheless, he used this approach at farbrengens because he believed that then is the appropriate occasion to deal with the animal soul, which understands no other language.

When he arrived in Tel Aviv, some elderly Chassidim there were upset at Reb Zalman Moishe's sharp style of farbrengens. They wrote a letter of complaint to Rabbi Yosef Yitzchok Schneerson, who replied, saying that their letter caused him “great pain and much sorrow of the spirit,” and completely dismissed their complaints.

== Piety ==
For many years he maintained a regimen of study of Chassidus: Early every morning he would study for six consecutive hours. He would then go to work for several hours as a shochet. He would then eat something, rest a bit, and pray for several hours.

Upon the urging of the Rebbe Rashab he recited the Tikkun Chatzos midnight prayer of mourning over the destruction of the Beis HaMikdash his entire life.

== Students ==
Reb Zalman Moishe's distinguished students included Reb Mendel Futerfas, Reb Nissan Neminov, and Reb Yoel Kahn.
