= Hemshech =

Hemshech translates to "series" or "continuation" in Hebrew and may refer to:

- Hemshech Samech Vov – a series of discourses in Chabad philosophy from 1906
- Hemshech Ayin Beis – a series of discourses in Chabad philosophy from 1912
- Camp Hemshekh – a Jewish summer camp associated with the Jewish Socialist movement
