= Yosef Yitzchak Jacobson =

American rabbi

Rabbi Yosef Yitzchak Jacobson
- Born: June 11, 1972 (age 54); Crown Heights, Brooklyn
- Other names: YY Jacobson; Yossi Jacobson
- Occupations: Journalist; Public speaker

Yosef Yitzchak Jacobson (Hebrew: יוסף יצחק יעקבסון or ג'ייקובסון) (born June 11, 1972), also known as YY Jacobson, is an American Chabad rabbi and speaker from Monsey, New York.

Jacobson served as editor-in-chief of the Algemeiner Journal, and as a choizer (transcriber) for Lubavitcher Rebbe Menachem Mendel Schneerson.

== Early life and career ==
Yosef Yitzchak Jacobson was born to Gershon Jacobson, a journalist, in Crown Heights, Brooklyn. His family was Chabad Hasidic. He began his studies in Oholei Torah, later moving on to Tomchei Temimim, a yeshiva located in Chabad's World Headquarters ("770").

In 1990, at the age of 17, Jacobson was recruited by his older brother Simon to join the team that prepared the public addresses of Menachem Mendel Schneerson for publication. Orthodox Jews being prohibited from using recording devices on Shabbat and Jewish Holidays, they were charged with memorizing these 5 hour long talks and later transcribing them, in a role known as choizer or meiniach.

As a senior fellow, Jacobson taught Talmud, Kabbalah, and Hasidic philosophy at Chabad Lubavitch Rabbinical Seminary Chovevei Torah. He received semikhah (rabbinic ordination) from Zalman Labkowsky in 2011.

In 2005, Jacobson followed in the footsteps of his father, becoming editor-in-chief of the Yiddish weekly Algemeiner Journal, which he contributed to for a number of years. He was a mashpia (spiritual mentor) at the Chovevei Torah Yeshiva in Crown Heights, and a teacher at the Ohr Chaim Learning Center in Monsey, New York.

== Talks ==
Jacobson holds public talks on many subjects. Some noted talks included:

- The role of religious leaders in today's world.
- The Rebbe and the Rav.
- Spiritual Leadership in Persistent Conflict
- 2008 keynote address at the annual US military Chief of Chaplains Senior Leadership Training Conference, as the first rabbi to give this keynote

== Works ==
Jacobson authored the following series:

- "A Tale of Two Souls" on the Tanya
- "A Journey Through the fundamentals of chassidus" in conjunction with Mayan Yisroel of Flatbush
- Emunah Series
- Captain, My Captain

== Personal life ==
Jacobson lives with his family in Monsey. His siblings are author Simon Jacobson, Boruch Sholom Jacobson—a Chabad shliach at Hunter College, Freida Hecht of Norwalk, Connecticut, and Chana Krasnianski of Manhattan.
