= Hillel Paritcher =

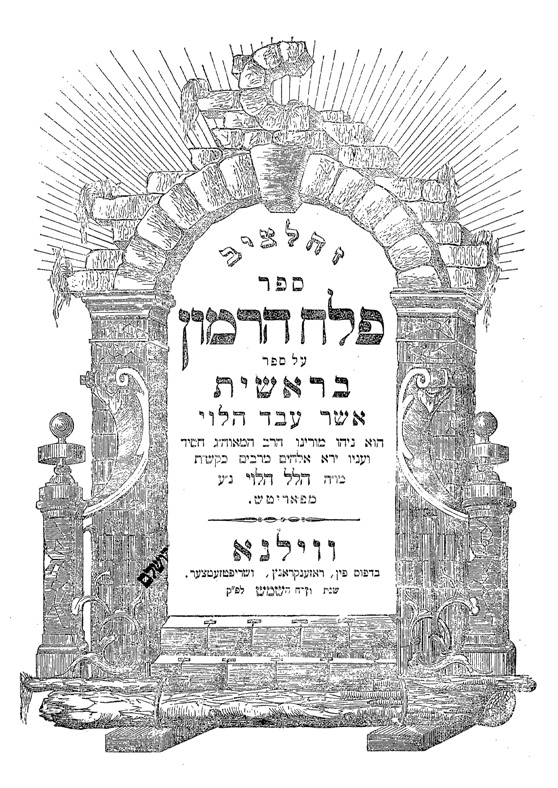
Front page of Pelech Harimon Hasidic discourses on Bereishis, Shemos, Vayikra, and Shir HaShirim, by Hillel of Paritch. Edition printed in Vilna 1887

Hillel HaLevi Malisov of Paritch, a levite by birth, commonly known as Reb Hillel Paritcher (1795-1864) was a famous Orthodox Jewish Chabad Rabbi born in Khmilnyk, Ukraine. Specifically, he served as a Mashpia (Hasidic mentor) and communal rabbi in the towns of Paritch (Parwich Parichi), near Minsk, Russia, and Bobroisk, Belarus. He was considered exceptional in his scholarship and piety, and is referred to as a Tzadik, and even as a "half Rebbe."

He was born in Khmilnyk, Ukraine, but grew up in Chemtz ( which is in the vicinity of Minsk). Although he was originally a disciple of Rabbi Mordechai of Chernobyl, he became a disciple of Rabbi Shneur Zalman of Liadi (though he never saw him) after learning in a “hidden” Tanya without the title page. In 1815 he began to travel regularly to Rabbi Dovber of Lubavitch and, after the latter’s passing, became a disciple of Rabbi Dovber's successor, Rabbi Menachem Mendel.

== Activities ==
Jewish agricultural settlement in the Kherson Governorate area had been initiated and encouraged by Rabbi Dovber. In 1818 Rabbi Dovber instructed Rabbi Hillel to visit these colonies regularly, saying, "Harvest material (gather funds for those in need) and sow spiritual (guide and inspire the colonists)." He provided conscripted soldiers (cantonists) in Bobroisk with kosher food, and aided Jews imprisoned there. Rabbi Hillel's appointment was emphatically confirmed by Rabbi Menachem Mendel. He died in Kherson on Shabbos, 11 Av, 5624 (1864 CE).

== Scholarship and piety ==
Hillel was born with exceptional gifts, and he strove diligently in Torah study. At thirteen he had mastered the Talmud, and at fifteen, the Kabbalistic works of the Arizal. The latter accomplishment was a wonder even then. In addition, he trained himself in self-discipline to the point that his body was mobilized to act only as the Torah prescribes, and even to conform with Kabbalah. Rabbi Hillel's way was to study Chasidic texts for many hours and then pray and meditate for many hours.

== Aphorisms ==
- "If those who indulge in lusts were to know the tremendous pleasure in matters of G-dliness that can be attained through study of Chasidus, and especially of the Holy Tanya, they would abandon all their lusts and pursue only the Holy Tanya."
- "Those who stay in the dark for long enough start to think that the darkness is light."
- "Every Chossid needs a chossid to be his mentor."

== Works ==
- Pelach Harimon. A profound discourse of Chasidic philosophy on Bereishis, Shemos, Vayikra, and Shir HaShirim. It includes many explanations of the Rebbes of Chabad not cited elsewhere, and which received the firm approbations of almost all the grandchildren of Rabbi Menachem Mendel. First printed in 1881 by the author's grandson, Pinchas HaLevi. It was printed by the Kehot Publication Society, and can be read here and here.
- Commentary on Shaar HaYichud of Rabbi Dovber of Lubavitch.
- Commentary on Kuntres HaHispa'alus of Rabbi Dovber of Lubavitch.
- Imrei No'am, Chasidic discourses.
- A tune composed by Rabbi Hillel.

== See also ==
- Eizik Homiler, a contemporary of Rabbi Hillel Paritcher
