= Imrei Binah =

Chabad book

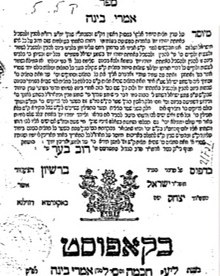
- Imrei Binah, Kapust edition
- Author: Rabbi Dovber Schneuri, the second Chabad Rebbe
- Published: Kehot Publication Society
- Pages: 486 (Hardcover edition)
- ISBN: 978-0826654991

Imrei Binah is a work by Rabbi Dovber Schneuri, the second Rebbe of the Chabad Hasidic movement. Imrei Binah is considered to be one of the most profound texts in Chabad philosophy.

The central themes discussed in Imrei Binah are the Hasidic explanations for the commandment of the reading the Shema and donning the Tefillin.

== Background ==
Imrei Binah was originally written for the Chassid Yekusiel Liepler, a student of Rabbi Dovber.

=== Teachings ===
- "Oil alludes to and symbolizes the esoteric and hidden parts of the Torah."

=== Study in Lubavitch ===
The Chassid Rabbi Yisroel Jacobson recalled that Imrei Binah was studied in the first Tomchei Tmimim yeshiva founded by the fifth Chabad Rebbe, Rabbi Sholom Dovber Schneersohn, in the town of Lubavitch. The mashpia, Rabbi Shilem Kuratin, convinced the older students at the yeshiva to study Imrei Binah, which they did for twelve hours a day. The younger students, Jacobson included, resisted Kuratin and chose to study the works of the fifth Rebbe instead.

=== Publishing ===
Imrei Binah was initially published in Kapust and was later republished by Kehot Publication Society in Brooklyn, New York. The Opening Gateway (Petach HaShaar) is available in English under the title "The Gateway To Understanding" at truekabbalah.com
