= Paks Conference =

- Date: August 20–21, 1844
- Duration: 2 days
- Location: Paks, Kingdom of Hungary
- Organised by: Rabbi Feivel Horwitz
- Participants: 25

The Paks Conference was a meeting of rabbis held 20 and 21 August 1844 in the town of Paks, Kingdom of Hungary. It was organized by Rabbi Feivel Horwitz in response to discussions on Jewish emancipation in the Hungarian Diet and the growing Reform movement in Germany.

== Background ==
Discussions in the Hungarian Diet on Jewish emancipation led to calls for the reform of Jewish dogma and ritual, in order that Jews might be drawn more closely toward their Christian fellow citizens. Soon after the Rabbinical Conference of Brunswick, Rabbi Pinḥas Feivel (Paul) Horwitz of Pápa, planned a rabbinical conference in order to establish a hierarchical constitution for the Hungarian congregations. Horwitz wished to protect Orthodox Judaism against changes that might be decreed by the government, or that might be introduced by individual congregations seeking to gain the goodwill of the government.

He therefore invited the Orthodox authorities alongside liberal partisans, for a total of 120 community rabbis. To Leo Holländer in Eperjes, a communal leader among the liberals, he wrote that his idea was to gather a representative body of Jews of all religious opinions; and even Aaron Chorin, the representative of what was in Hungary ultra-Reform, was invited.

== Conference ==
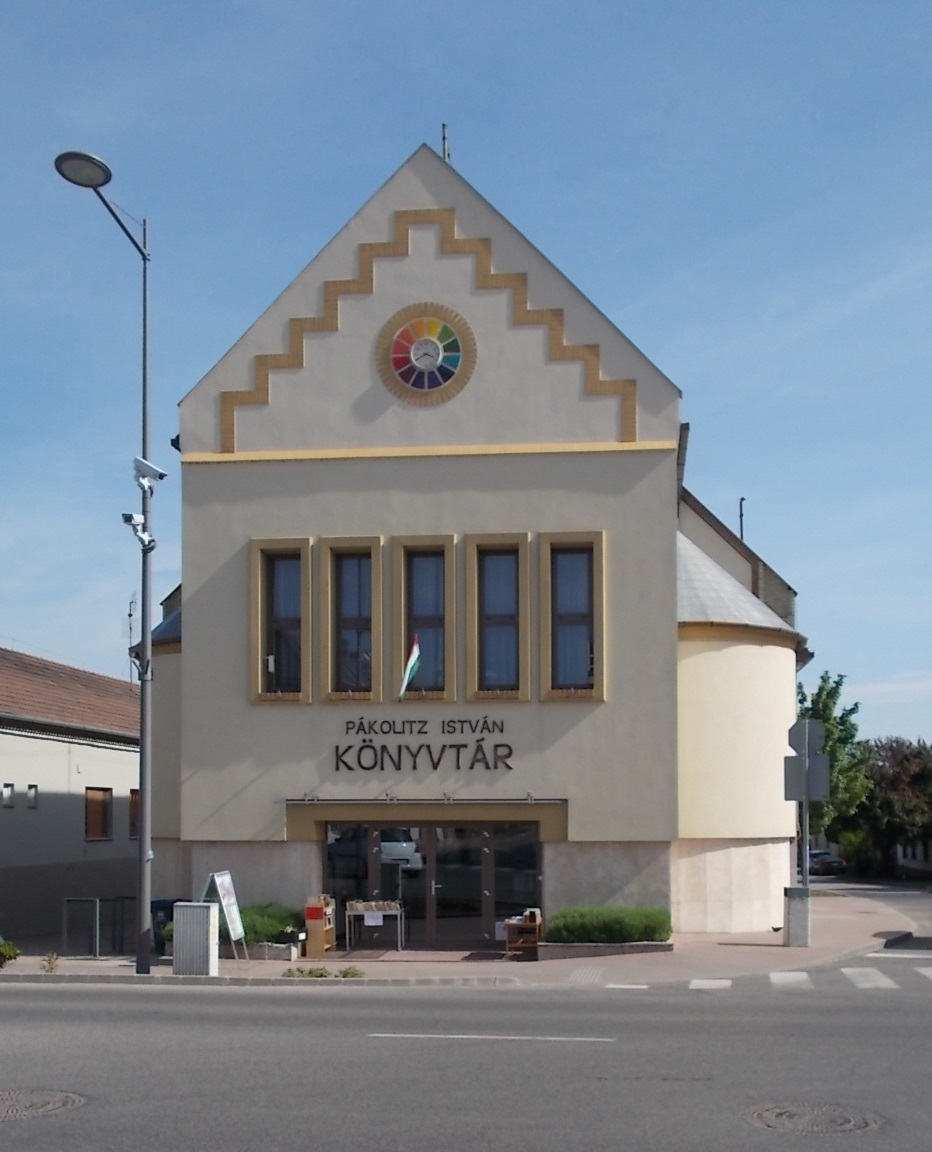
Paks Synagogue in 2018

The meeting was attended by only twenty-five rabbis, who held the proxies of twenty-five others. The recognised Orthodox leaders, Samuel Wolf Schreiber of Presburg and the disciples of his famous father, Moses Sofer, ignored the convention. Of Orthodox authorities, only Judah Aszód of Szerdahely and Götz Kohn Schwerin of Baja were present; Löw Schwab of Budapest represented the middle view; Aaron Chorin, who died a few days after the convention, was too weak to attend, and sent a letter in which he urged the adoption of reforms. Horwitz, however, confined his labours to a proposal for the organisation of a hierarchy in which the rabbi of each congregation should have absolute power in religious affairs, while a rabbinical committee should govern the affairs of every one of the four districts into which Hungary was to be divided. Finally the Jewish affairs of the whole country were to be governed by a "Great Synod," meeting every three years.

Schwab demanded that, first, a convention of rabbis and laymen should be called which should deliberate on the organisation of a representative body, comprising both rabbis and laymen, and which should be the highest tribunal on all Jewish questions, such as management of congregations and schools, authorisation of religious textbooks, and the like. He further demanded a declaration with regard to the attacks of the anti-Semites on the Jews, and he asked that the conference should declare that Judaism demanded of every Jew love for his country; that the same laws of morality regulate relations between Jew and Jew as between Jew and Christian; that an oath sworn in civil courts be binding on every Jew; and that training in manual labour be encouraged.

The convention did not arrive at any definite result, and finally it was decided that in the following year another convention should be called, for which Horwitz enlisted the support of Paul III Anton, Prince Esterházy. However, the untimely death of Horwitz on February 24, 1845, at the age of forty-nine, brought the whole movement to a close.

== Notable attendees ==
- Judah Aszód
- Götz Kohn Schwerin
- Löw Schwab
- Meir Eisenstaedter

== See also ==
- Schism in Hungarian Jewry
