= Derech Chaim (Chabad) =

Jewish religious text

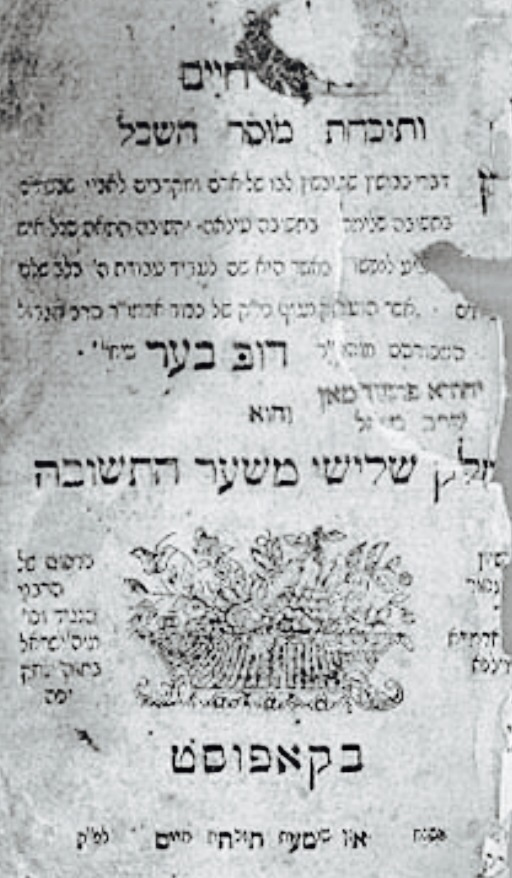
- Derech Chaim, Kapust edition
- Author: Rabbi Dovber Schneuri
- Original title: Derech Chaim V'Tochachas Musar Haskail
- Language: Hebrew
- Subject: Jewish mysticism, Hasidic philosophy
- Genre: Religion
- Published: Kapust, 1819; Kehot Publication Society, Brooklyn, 1947, 1955, 1975
- Media type: Print
- Pages: 304
- ISBN: 0-8266-5584-X

Derech Chaim (Hebrew: דרך חיים, "The Way of Life") is a work on the subject of repentance by the second Rebbe of the Chabad Hasidic movement, Rabbi Dovber Schneuri.

== Topics discussed ==
=== "Resurrection from sin" ===
In Derech Chaim, Rabbi Schneuri interprets the second blessing in the Jewish Shemoneh Esreh prayer ("Blessed are You, God, Who revives the dead") as referring to two sets of resurrections. One of the messianic era (following the traditional interpretation) as well as a present resurrection of the souls of the wicked. Rabbi Schneuri, citing the Talmud, states that the wicked are termed "dead" even during their lifetime, however, through repentance those who have sinned may renew their connection with God and are "returned to life". The blessing therefore refers to the idea of resurrection in both present and future tenses.

=== Two types of orphans ===
Rabbi Schneuri employs the analogy of two types of orphans, one whose father has died, the other who has no mother, to describe those who commit particular deeds which damage the soul's spiritual "sight" or "hearing" (which Rabbi Schneuri calls the "father and mother" components of the soul). Interpreting the verse "When my father and my mother forsake me, then the Lord will take me up," Rabbi Schneuri describes the former sinner drawing inspiration from God who comforts the "orphan" repentant.

== Call for study ==
In 1956, the seventh Chabad rebbe, Rabbi Menachem Mendel Schneerson, encouraged yeshiva students to study Derech Chaim and other works on the subject of Teshuva during the month of Elul, a time of the year associated with repentance due to its proximity to the Jewish High Holy Days.

== Rabbi Shalom Dovber ==
Rabbi Yosef Yitzchak Schneersohn, the sixth Chabad Rebbe, recounted an episode involving his father, Rabbi Sholom Dovber Schneersohn, the fifth Rebbe, and the book Derech Chaim. Rabbi Yosef Yitzchak observed his father and a number of his followers engaged in an ecstatic gathering; Rabbi Sholom Dovber was surrounded by his followers and held the book Derech Chaim and sang the Niggun (Hasidic wordless melody) "Hiney Ma Tov Umanayim."

== Publication ==
Derech Chaim was originally published in Kapust, in 1819, during the lifetime of Rabbi Dovber. The work was later reprinted a number of times by the central Chabad publishing house, Kehot Publication Society, beginning in 1947.

== See also ==
- Chabad philosophy
- Rabbi Dovber Schneuri
