= Gershon Jacobson =

American newspaper editor (1934–2005)

Gershon DovBer Jacobson (May 30, 1934 – May 29, 2005) was the founder, editor and publisher of Der Algemeiner Journal, one of the largest Yiddish-language weekly newspapers in North America. He died at the age of 70 and lived in Brooklyn.

Born in Moscow on May 30, 1933, Jacobson began his journalistic career in Paris writing for French newspapers following the war in the early 1950s. In 1952, he and his family moved to Toronto then to New York City.

In 1953, Jacobson moved to the United States where he became the city editor for Der Tog Morgen Journal (The Daily Jewish Journal), one of the largest daily Yiddish newspapers (formed at that time through the union of the two dailies Der Tog and Der Morgen Zshurnal). Gershon Jacobson also worked as a journalist for the New York Herald Tribune and in the 1960s replaced Elie Wiesel as the UN correspondent for Israel's largest daily, Yediot Acharonot. In 1972 he founded The Algemeiner Journal, the largest Yiddish weekly newspaper, which he published and edited till his death on May 29, 2005. The paper, printed in Yiddish with a four-page English supplement, has a circulation of 18,000.

Jacobson received an undergraduate degree from the University of Toronto and a graduate degree from the Columbia University Graduate School of Journalism. He worked on The Herald-Tribune from the late 1950s until it ceased publication in 1966. After the Tribune ceased publication, Jacobson moved to the New York Post and then to Newsweek, and was later city editor for Der Tog-Morgen Journal, a Yiddish-language daily. After Der Tog closed in late 1971, he founded Der Algemeiner Journal.

His three sons, Simon, Baruch Sholom and Yosef Yitzchok, are all rabbis in Brooklyn. His two daughters are Freida Hecht of Norwalk, Connecticut and Chanie Krasnianski of Manhattan, New York City.
