= Oholei Torah =

Chabad school

Oholei Torah ("Tents of Torah") is the common name of the Lubavitch schools Educational Institute Oholei Menachem and Talmudical Seminary Oholei Torah. The main branches of the school and its administrative offices are located in Brooklyn, New York City.

Educational Institute Oholei Torah is a yeshiva for male students in the Chabad-Lubavitch movement, drawing students from around the world. More than 70% of graduates go on to lifelong positions as Chabad Shluchim, initiating and directing Jewish activities in 75 countries with the goal of bringing Jews closer to Judaism.

Oholei Torah's curriculum consists solely of Torah study, with a strong emphasis on Rabbi Menachem Mendel Schneerson's teachings. The curriculum has been noted for its exclusion of English, Math and all other secular studies.

== History ==
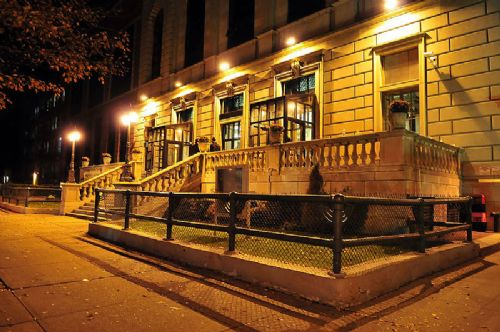
Oholei Torah, 2011

Oholei Torah was founded in 1956 by Rabbi Michoel Teitelbaum and Reb Dovid Deitsch at Rabbi Menachem Mendel Schneerson's direction.

The school opened in a synagogue in Brownsville with a handful of students.

In 1958, the school expanded and a kindergarten for young boys was introduced. In 1964, Oholei Torah added a junior high school division, followed several years later by Oholei Torah Mesivta High School. The Beis HaMedrash, Talmudic Seminary Oholei Torah was founded in 1970, for post-high school Talmudic studies.

In 1975, the school began renting space for the elementary classes at the Brooklyn Jewish Center at 667 Eastern Parkway, built in 1920, and purchased the building outright in 1982. Beginning in 1997, the building underwent a major expansion, with a new wing (known as the Deitsch Campus, after the school's major financial patron Dovid Deitsch) and a study hall for the Talmudical Seminary.

In 1994, the elementary school was renamed "Oholei Menachem" in honor of Rabbi Menachem Mendel Schneerson, though the old name persists in general usage. Today Oholei Torah enrolls approximately 1600 students in its various divisions.

In 2016, the school was the subject of an exposé in Newsweek for its decades long history of failing to fire teachers who physically abused and molested students.

== Divisions ==
Educational Institute Oholei Menachem (Oholei Torah) consists of a preschool grade (Pre-1A) and 8 elementary grades. Each grade has an average enrollment of about 100 students, so there are four or five classes for each grade.

Oholei Torah's kindergarten elementary school and middle school (until 8th grade) are located in the Deitsch Campus at 667 Eastern Parkway. There is also a smaller kindergarten division at Cong. B'nai Abraham in East Flatbush, a synagogue where Rabbi Teitelbaum served as president until his death in 2005. the eighth grade has their own building on Troy Avenue, and high school has a new building in Remsen village.

In 2019 they added a "Shiur Hey" (although in actuality there are only four shiurim as they skip Shiur Gimmel) to 1) help accommodate the so-called "Shlichus shortage"; 2) to give those that want an opportunity for another year of Yeshiva in OT.

== Publications ==
Since 1979 the Beis Medrash has published a journal (formerly weekly, now biweekly) Haoros U'bi'urim Oholei Torah, and an annual volume, which has variously been called Kovetz Oholei Torah or Kovetz Pilpulim. Both contain essays on various torah topics, mostly contributed by current students and staff, as well as alumni. Occasionally prominent non-Lubavitch rabbis, such as Rabbi Gavriel Zinner, submit papers to the journal, which is edited by Rabbi Avrohom Y. Gerlitzky, who also contributes at least one essay to each issue.)

== Notable alumni ==
- Avraham Fried, 1977
- Simon Jacobson, 1979
- Yossi Jacobson, 1989
- Shlomo Raskin, 1990
