= Dirah betachtonim =

Chabad philosophy

Dirah betachtonim (Hebrew: דירה בתחתונים, romanized: dirā bəṯaḥtonim, lit. 'a dwelling in the lowly realms' is a significant theological concept in Chabad philosophy describing the ultimate desire of God as relating to the manifestation of the divine presence within the material world.

== Overview ==
The concept of a divine dwelling is attributed to a statement in the Midrash Tanhuma, Nasso 16: "Rabbi Samuel bar Nahman said, When the Holy One, blessed be He, created the world, He longed to have an abode below just as He had on high.'" The concept of the possibility of the manifestation of the divine presence in the "lowly realms" is taken up by the kabbalist Joseph ben Abraham Gikatilla, who associated this idea with the construction of the Tabernacle, which was built by Moses and the Israelites after The Exodus.

In Chabad, a school of Hasidic Judaism, the concept of dirah betachtonim is presented as a central doctrine of Judaism by Shneur Zalman of Liadi, the first Chabad rebbe. The concept is later strongly advanced by the fifth Chabad rebbe, Sholom Dovber Schneersohn, in a series of treatises delivered in 1905–06 known as Samech Vov. This idea is pronounced in this series as the ultimate purpose and meaning of creation. The idea was subsequently advanced and developed by Rabbi Menachem Mendel Schneerson, the seventh Chabad rebbe, as a guiding principle for social action, and is linked to the concept of the sublimation of physical aspects of existence to divinity. Additionally, the concept is presented within the Chabad philosophical system in paradoxical form. Despite being revealed through creation's unfolding, the deepest essence of God remained veiled. Yet, it is in the humblest realm, the physical world inhabited by corporeal beings, that this divine essence will manifest most fully functioning as a paradoxical sanctuary where the highest meets the lowest.

In Chabad philosophy, dirah betachtonim is compared to the type of divine manifestation in the World of Atzilut, a realm or sphere of existence theorised in the writings of kabbalah. The divine presence in Atzilut is thought to be especially profound; dirah betachtonim is presented as the attempt to mimic that manifestation within the World of Assiah, the lowest sphere of existence as theorised in kabbalah. Rabbi Menachem Mendel Schneerson utilized the concept of dirah betachtonim to provide theological justification and purpose for the relocation of the Chabad movement to the United States in the wake of World War Two. The process of the divine dwelling is strongly linked with ritual action (mitzvot) and religious study (talmud torah); this idea was expanded upon greatly by Shneur Zalman of Liadi. The concept is also linked to the Jewish hope for the messianic rebuilding of the Temple in Jerusalem as the ultimate manifestation of the divine in the material world.

According to the second Chabad rebbe, Rabbi Dovber Schneuri, this dimension of divine desire to manifest itself, expressed as a desire to bestow kindness to creation, is viewed as an external aspect of the divine will and essence.

=== Reception ===
The concept of dirah betachtonim is the central focus of the book Heaven on Earth by Rabbi Faitel Levin. According to Levin, it is not a solitary concept in Chabad philosophy, but represents a complete theological approach to the practice of Judaism.

James R. Russell, a scholar and professor in Ancient Near Eastern, Iranian and Armenian Studies, notes the association of the concept with the use of Hasidic parables involving a king and his lost son.

== See also ==
- Divine presence
- Immanence
- Theophany
