= Futerfas =

Futerfas is a surname. Notable people with the surname include:

- Alan Futerfas (born 1961), American criminal defense attorney
- Menachem Mendel Futerfas (1907–1995), Chabad Mashpia and Chossid
