= Meir Ash =

Meir Ash could be either of two Rabbis both known by the abbreviation Maharam Ash (Maharam Esh):

- Meir Eisenstadt (died 1744), author of Meore Esh and teacher of Rabbi Jonathan Eybeschutz
- Meir Eisenstaedter (1780–1852), author of Imre Esh and student of the Chasam Sofer
