= Sefer Hamitzvot (disambiguation) =

Sefer Hamitzvot is a book by Moses Maimonides listing the Jewish commandments.

Sefer Hamitzvot (lit. "Book of the Commandments" in Hebrew) may also refer to:

- Derech Mitzvosecha (also called Sefer Hamitzvos), a Hasidic work by Rabbi Menachem Mendel Schneersohn published in 1912–1913
- Sefer ha-Mitzvot, a book by Anan ben David, published c. 770
