= Chabad philosophy =

Chabad-Lubavitch philosophical tradition

Chabad philosophy comprises the teachings of the leaders of Chabad-Lubavitch, a Hasidic movement led by the Schneersohn family and formerly based in Lyubavichi, Russian Empire. Chabad philosophy focuses on religious concepts such as God, the soul, and the meaning of the Jewish commandments, and the afterlife. Teachings are often drawn from classical Judaic teachings and Jewish mysticism. Classical Judaic writings and Jewish mysticism, especially the Zohar and Lurianic Kabbalah, are frequently cited in Chabad works. These texts are used both as sources for Chabad teachings as well as material requiring interpretation by Chabad authors.

While Chabad was founded by Rabbi Shneur Zalman of Liadi,Chabad philosophy is based on the teachings of the Baal Shem Tov (founder of Hasidism) and the Magid of Mezritch (the Baal Shem Tov's successor and Shneur Zalman's teacher and mentor). The teachings of Rabbi Shneur Zalman, the first Chabad Rebbe, form the basis of Chabad philosophy. Rabbi Shneur Zalman's teachings were greatly expanded upon by succeeding generations of Chabad Rebbes. One of the most central Chabad works is the Tanya by Schneur Zalman, and many themes found in the Tanya receive greater treatment in subsequent works.

== "Chabad" ==
According to Shneur Zalman's work Tanya, the intellect consists of three interconnected processes: Chochma (wisdom), Bina (understanding), and Da'at (knowledge). While other branches of Hasidism focused primarily on the idea that "God desires the heart", Shneur Zalman argued that God also desires the mind, and that the mind is the "gateway" to the heart. With the Chabad philosophy, he elevated the mind above the heart, arguing that "understanding is the mother of fear and love for God".

According to Rabbi Lord Jonathan Sacks, Chief rabbi of the United Kingdom (1991–2013), in Shneur Zalman's system, Chochma represents "the creation in its earliest potentiality; the idea of a finite world as was first born in the divine mind. Binah is the idea conceived in its details, the result of contemplation. Da'at is, as it were, the commitment to creation, the stage at which the idea becomes an active intention." While in Kabbalah there are clearly delineated levels of holiness, in Hasidism and Chabad philosophy these are grounded in the mundanities of people's inner lives. So in reality—according to the Chabad analogy—Chochma is the birth of an idea in the mind, Binah is the contemplation, and Da'at is the beginning of the actualisation of an idea. Sacks argues that this provided a psychological formulation that enabled the hasid to substantiate his mystical thoughts. Sacks states that "This was an important advance because bridging the gap between spiritual insight and daily behaviour had always been a problem for Jewish mysticism."

Chabad philosophy argues that man is neither static nor passive nor dependent on others to connect to God. Shneur Zalman rejected all ideas of aristocratic birth and elitism—instead, he argued for meritocracy where all were capable of growth; in his view, every Jew was capable of becoming a Tzadik. Chabad often contrasted itself with other schools (termed by Chabad thinkers as Chagat) of Hasidism. While all Hasidism have a certain focus on emotions, Chagat saw emotions as a reaction to physical stimuli, such as music, dancing, singing, and artistic beauty. Shneur Zalman, on the other hand, taught that the emotions must be led by the mind, and thus the focus of Chabad thought was to be Torah study and prayer rather than esotericism and songs. As a Talmudic scholar, Shneur Zalman endeavored to place Kabbalah and Hasidism on a rational basis. In the Tanya, he defines his approach as moach shalit al halev (Hebrew: מוח שליט על הלב, "the brain ruling the heart").

== Themes ==
=== Prayer ===
Prayer takes a central place in Chabad philosophy. In the Tanya, the desire to pray is referred to as the "desire for life". Zalman counseled those who could not remain at the synagogue for lengthy prayers to leave early rather than disturb the rest of the congregation.

In addition, prayer is considered a way of understanding and connecting to God. Far more emphasis is placed on prayer in Chabad than in other sects of Judaism. Chabad's mode of prayer includes lengthy contemplation of God's nature. One particular Hasid, Rabbi Yekusiel Lepeler, is said to have at times prayed at such length that by the time he finished the morning prayers, it was time for the afternoon prayers and that lead into the evening prayers.

=== Contemplation ===
A central position in Chabad's philosophy is that the ultimate service of God can be achieved through contemplation and other cognitive processes rather than emotions. Chabad philosophy differs from the teachings of other Hasidic groups in this regard, emphasizing the use of the mind's cognitive faculties in religious devotional efforts. Chabad philosophy provides a conceptual approach to understanding God and other spiritual matters, maintaining that contemplating such topics constitutes Avodat HaShem (עבודת השם, 'the service of God').

Chabad philosophy also incorporated the teachings of Kabbalah as a means of dealing with one's daily life and psyche. It teaches that every aspect of the world exists only through God's intervention. Chabad teaches that one can attain complete control over one's actions through an intellectual approach and meditation.

=== Torah study ===
Shneur Zalman fought against the perception that was prevalent in the early years of Hasidism that the movement neglected Talmud studies by focusing too heavily on mysticism and obscurantism. He emphasized that mysticism without Talmudic study was worthless, if not dangerous. Without Talmudic study, he argued, the mind could never be elevated—and if the mind is not elevated, the soul will starve. On the other hand, he argued that while the Torah was to be the focus of all study, it was also essential to integrate the Torah's teachings into one's life. In a letter to Joshua Zeitlin of Shklow, Zalman wrote: "The Hasidim, too, set aside time for study. The difference between them and the Misnagdim is this: the latter set time for study and they are limited by time, whereas the former make the Torah their path of life."

Shneur Zalman taught that the Torah must be studied joyously—studying without joy is frowned upon. He provided a metaphor: an angel is created when a mitzvah is fulfilled. But if the mitzvah were joyless, the angel too would be dispirited. Thus, while Zalman emphasized that Hasidism focuses on traditional Jewish scholarship rather than on mysticism, he was emphatic that this must be done with zeal and joy.

==== Bible stories ====
Shneur Zalman stated that in the Hebrew Bible, lofty teachings are transcribed in the form of stories. He quotes an unnamed source, noting that studying such biblical episodes simply as stories does not constitute the fulfillment of the Jewish commandment of "Torah study".

=== Kabbalah ===
In Chabad's thought, the study of Kabbalah is seen, in some instances, not only as an act of religious study but as a way to fulfill other Jewish commandments. In the Tanya, the study of Kabbalah is divided between the study of Seder Hishtalshelus (the Kabbalistic theory of the evolution of the universe) and the study of the esoteric meaning of the commandments. The study of the commandments is said to be a superior form of study because it relates more closely to the performance of mitzvot and, in some cases, is considered to take the place of the commandment itself.

=== Seder Hishtalshelus ===
Seder Hishtalshelus (Hebrew: סדר השתלשלות, 'order of development', 'order of evolution'), refers in Kabbalah and Hasidic thought to the chain-like descent of spiritual worlds (Hebrew: עולמות, romanized: olamot) between God and Creation. Each spiritual world denotes a complete realm of existence, resulting from its general proximity or distance to divine revelation. Each realm is also a form of consciousness reflected in this world through the psychology of the soul. The concept of Seder Hishtalshelus is explored in numerous Chabad philosophical works.

=== Love of God ===
According to Zalman, there are two primary forms of human love for God. One form, called "natural love," is one that is brought about through the subjection of bodily drives; the other, "produced love," is the result of contemplation on topics that arouse such emotions.

=== Love of one's fellow Jew ===
Ahavat Yisrael (אהבת ישראל, 'love for Israel') is a biblical precept extensively elaborated in Chabad thought. In the Tanya, Zalman states that the obligation to love one's fellow Jew extends even to sinners.

=== Charity ===
In Chabad's thought, charity is seen not only as a physical act of giving but as a conduit for spiritual enlightenment. In the Tanya, giving charity is said to draw inspiration and bring about humility.

=== Unity ===
Rabbi Menachem Mendel Schneerson advanced a proposed unity between opposing concepts in his writings and lectures. He suggested that it was possible to unite the mundane aspects of the world with the element of godliness in the world. Schneerson emphasized the significance of creating an "abode for God on this world". Consequently, he encouraged his followers to unite life in the modern world with the teachings of Judaism. He felt that the world was not a contradiction to the word of God, and it was to be embraced rather than shunned.

Schneerson taught that modern technology does not necessarily contradict a life of spirituality. For that reason, Chabad has consistently utilized modern technology to spread its message. Since its inception, Chabad has used the radio, and later television, satellite feeds, and the Internet to spread its message.

=== Dirah Betachtonim ===
Dira Betachtonim (Hebrew: דירה בתחתונים) is the process of manifesting the presence of God within the world. An examination of Dira Betachtonim is found in Samech Vov by the fifth Chabad Rebbe, Rabbi Sholom Dovber Schneersohn. In Samech Vov, this concept is described as the ultimate purpose of creation.

Dira Betachtonim is also explored by the seventh Rebbe, Rabbi Menachem Mendel. Central to the Dira Betachtonim concept is the notion of sublimating the physical aspects of existence.

=== Bitul Hayesh ===
In Chabad philosophy, yeshut ("selfhood" or "self-assertion") is seen as the antithesis to yichud ("unity"), a denial of the reality that God "fills the heavens and the earth" and that there is none beside him. Bitul hayesh means total self-negation and a conscious awareness of the ultimate nature of man. Bitul hayesh is achieved by reflecting on God's greatness, exaltedness, and majesty. When one feels that they are in the presence of God, they will feel a sense of insignificance and humility. At the same time, the worshipper will feel a passionate adoration for God and a desire to cleave to God.

=== Moshiach ===
In Chabad theology, the concept of messianism (Hebrew: משיח, romanized: moshiakh, 'messiah') is discussed at length. The seventh Lubavitcher Rebbe, Rabbi Menachem Mendel Schneerson, taught that the concept of moshiakh is linked to the fifth and highest level of the soul, the yechida (the soul's essence). He explains that just like the yechida of a soul is that soul's quintessential point; the same is true with moshiakh, which is a revelation of godliness that transcends all limitations. Hence, in the times of moshiakh, the world will be filled with the level of yechida, perfecting and completing this world.

== Other concepts ==
A number of other essential concepts in Chabad philosophy are referenced in scattered locations in Chabad literature. Though these topics were discussed briefly and were not the focus of any major work, new insights have been drawn from their treatment in Chabad thought.

=== Roles of Rebbe and Hasid ===
In its earlier formulations, Hasidic thought elevated the rebbe to a level above typical Hasid. A rebbe was closer to God, his prayers were more amenable to him, and a hasid should satisfy himself with attachment to the Rebbe and indirectly to God. A rebbe was to be a living example of perfection and would concern himself with intellectualism on behalf of the followers. According to Sacks, Chabad stressed the individual responsibilities of every Jew: "The rebbe...became more of a teacher and adviser, recognising the vocation of each of his followers, guiding them towards it, uncovering their strengths, and rejoicing in their achievements."

In Chabad's thought, the Rebbe is not an intermediary between the Hasid and God. Instead, the role of the rebbe was to train followers to become spiritually self-sufficient and to turn to their Rebbe for instructions rather than intercession with God, miracles, or blessings.

Hasidism traditionally demanded that every Hasid personally participate in disseminating Torah and Judaism to one's surroundings and seek the benefit of one's fellow Jew. Rabbi Sholom Dovber Schneersohn said: "A Hasid is he who surrenders himself for the benefit of another." Beyond this, Chabad demands pnimiyut (inwardness/sincerity): one should not act superficially, as a mere act of faith, but instead with inner conviction. The relationship the Chabad Hasid has with the Rebbe is called hiskashrus. Rabbi Yosef Yitzchak Schneersohn stated, "A bond with me (hiskashrus) is made by studying my ma'amorim of Hasidut, by fulfilling my request concerning the daily recital of Tehillim, and the like."

In continuing longstanding Chabad tradition, Rabbi Menachem Mendel Schneerson demanded that each individual advance spiritually and not rely on the Rebbe to do it for them.

== Major texts ==
=== Tanya ===
Sefer HaTanya, Shneur Zalman's magnum opus, is the first schematic treatment of Hasidic moral philosophy and its metaphysical foundations. The original name of the first book is Sefer Shel Beinonim, the "Book of the Intermediates." It is also known as Likutei Amarim—"Collected Sayings." Sefer Shel Beinonim analyzes the inner struggle of the individual and the path to resolution. Citing the biblical verse "the matter is very near to you, in your mouth, your heart, to do", the philosophy is based on the notion that the human is not inherently evil; rather, every individual has an inner conflict that is characterized with two different inclinations, the good and the bad.

Some have argued that Shneur Zalman's moderation and synthesis saved the general Hasidic movement from breaking away from Orthodox Judaism. It allowed for mystically inclined Hasidim to be familiarized with traditional Jewish scholarship and observance, and for traditionalists to access Hasidism within the framework of Jewish scholarship.

=== Likutei Torah/Torah Or ===
Likutei Torah/Torah Or is a compilation of Chassidic treatises by the first Chabad Rebbe, Rabbi Shneur Zalman of Liadi. The treatises are arranged according to the Weekly Torah portion, and are studied regularly by Chabad Chassidim.

=== Toras Chaim ===
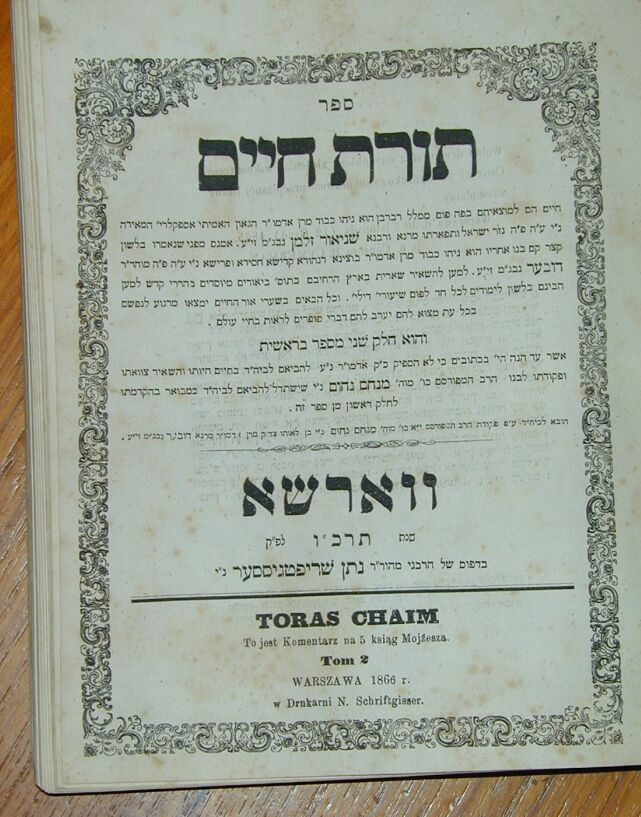
Toras Chaim, 1866 edition, Warsaw

Toras Chaim is a two-volume work of Hasidic discourses on the books of Genesis and Exodus by the second Chabad Rebbe, Rabbi Dovber Schneuri. The work is arranged in a similar fashion as Likutei Torah/Torah Or following the weekly Torah portion. The treatises in Toras Chaim are noted for their length and depth.

=== Imrei Binah ===
Imrei Binah is a work by Rabbi Dovber Schneuri considered to be one of the most profound texts in Chabad philosophy. The central themes discussed in Imrei Binah are the Hasidic explanations for the commandment of the reading the Shema and donning the Tefillin.

=== Samech Vov ===
Sefer Hamamaarim Taf Resh Samech Vav (Hebrew: ספר המאמרים תרס״ו), is a compilation of the Chasidic treatises by Rabbi Shalom Dovber Schneersohn, the Rebbe Rashab, from the Hebrew year 5666 (1905–06). This series of Chassidic essays is considered a fundamental work of Chabad mysticism.

=== Ayin Beis ===
Sefer Hamamaarim Taf Resh Ayin Beis (Hebrew: ספר המאמרים תרע״ב), is a compilation of the Chasidic treatises by Rabbi Shalom Dovber Schneersohn, the Rebbe Rashab, from the Hebrew year 5672 (1911–12). This series of Chassidic essays is considered a fundamental work of Chabad mysticism.

=== Sichos ===
The talks or Sichos of the seventh Lubavitcher Rebbe, Rabbi Menachem Mendel Schneerson, contain a wealth of commentary on Chabad Hassidic thought. Major compilations of these talks include:

- Likutei Sichos
- Sichos Kodesh
- Hisvadius - Toras Menachem
- Sefer Hasichos

=== Other major texts ===
Other major texts of Chabad philosophy include:

- Siddur Im Dach by Rabbi Schneur Zalman
- Derech Mitzvosecha (Sefer Hamitzvos) by Rabbi Menachem Mendel Schneersohn, the third Chabad Rebbe
- Derech Emunah (Sefer Hachakira) by the third Rebbe
- Or Hatorah by the third Rebbe
- Pelech Harimon by Rabbi Hillel Paritcher
- Sh'tei Hameoros by Rabbi Yitzchak Eizik Epstein
- Chanah Ariel by Rabbi Yitzchak Eizik Epstein

=== Maamarim ===
Chabad Maamarim/Ma'amorim (Hebrew: מאמרים, lit. "discourses", singular Maamar Hebrew: מאמר) are the collective term for the essays and treatises of Hasidic thought written by the Chabad Rebbes. While the more often studied series of Maamarim go by the particular name of the series, lesser known treatises are either referred to as "a Maamer by-" a particular Rabbe of Chabad or as "Maamarim from the year...".

=== Hayom Yom ===
Hayom Yom (Hebrew: היום יום, "Today is day ...") is a short work compiled by Rabbi Menachem Mendel Schneerson at the behest of his father-in-law, Rabbi Yosef Yitzchok Schneersohn. The book is formatted as a calendar for the Hebrew year of 5703 (1942–43). The calendar contains a number of Chassidic insights and customs and is read by many Chabad members on a daily basis.

=== Other works ===
- Derech Chaim by Rabbi Dovber Schneuri on the topic of repentance
- Inyona Shel Toras Hachassidus by Rabbi Menachem Mendel Schneerson, the seventh Chabad Rebbe
- Sefer HaErchim Chabad (an encyclopedia on Chassidic Philosophy by Rabbi Yoel Kahn (8 volumes as of 2021)
- Chabad Philosophy by Dr. Nissan Mindel
- Deep Calling Onto Deep by Rabbi Immanuel Schochet
- The Longer Shorter Way by Rabbi Adin Steinzaltz

== Contemporary works ==
Works by contemporary Chabad writers include the following:

- Toward a Meaningful Life - an English-language best-selling book on Chabad philosophy written by Simon Jacobson. The book distills Chassidic ideas and translates them into contemporary English.
- Bringing Heaven Down to Earth - a book written by Rabbi Tzvi Freeman, a writer and editor for Chabad.org. Freeman's book transcribes the teachings of Chabad philosophy as short "meditations". The book contains 365 such meditations.
- Communicating the Infinite - a scholarly work by Naftali Loewenthal, a Chabad Hasid and a professor of Jewish mysticism.
- Several books explaining the Tanya written by Adin Steinsaltz.

=== Journals ===
A number of scholarly journals have been published by the Chabad movement; journal articles often cover topics in Chabad philosophy. Well-known Chabad journals include:

- Hatomim – a journal published by the central Chabad yeshiva running from 1935 to 1938
- Kovetz Yagdil Torah – a journal published by the Chabad kollel in Brooklyn during the 1980s
- Oholei Lubavitch – an important but short-lived journal published in Kfar Chabad, Israel in 1995-6
- Kerem Chabad – journal edited by Yehoshua Mondshein

== See also ==
- Jewish philosophy
  - Hasidic philosophy
