= Toras Chaim (Chabad) =

Chabad philosophy book

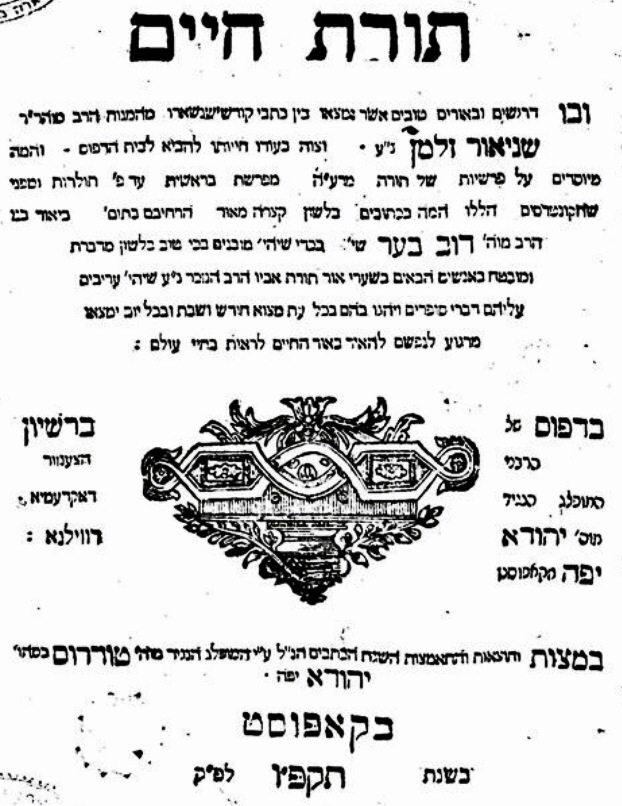
- Toras Chaim, 1826 edition, Kapust
- Author: Rabbi Dovber Schneuri, the second Chabad Rebbe
- Published: Kapust, 1826 (first edition); Warsaw, 1866; Kehot Publication Society, Shanghai, 1946; Kehot Publication Society, Brooklyn, NY, 1975, 1993, 2004
- Pages: 1,812 (current hardcover edition)
- ISBN: 0-8266-5588-2

Toras Chaim (Hebrew: תורת חיים, "Torah of Life") is a two-volume work of Hasidic discourses on the books of Genesis and Exodus by the second rebbe (hereditary hasidic leader) of the Chabad dynasty, Dovber Schneuri. The work is arranged according to the weekly Torah portion.

The treatises in Toras Chaim long and complex, and elucidate of concepts discussed in Likutei Torah/Torah Or.

== Publication ==
=== Kapust ===
The first printing of Toras Chaim occurred during Rabbi Dovber's lifetime; it was printed in Kapust in 1826. This edition contained Hasidic treatises covering just the first half of the book of Genesis.

=== Warsaw ===
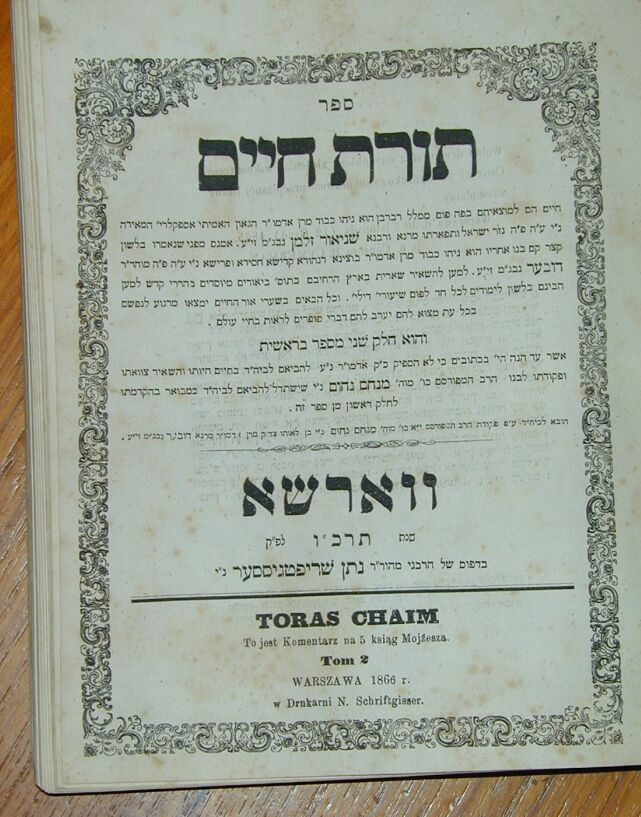
1866, Warsaw edition

The next edition of Toras Chaim was published in Warsaw, in 1866. The edition was published by Rafael Mordechai Schneerson, the great-nephew of Dovber Schneuri, together with Schneur Schneerson, a grandson of Dovber. This edition included treatises covering the second half of the book of Genesis.

=== Shanghai ===
In 1946, the Chabad yeshiva in Shanghai and the central Chabad publishing house, Kehot Publication Society, republished the Warsaw edition of Toras Chaim. Additionally, a series of unpublished Hasidic treatises by Dovber covering the book of Exodus were included in a separate second volume. The edition was published. The second volume was never typeset. Instead, those treatises remained a photocopy of the original handwritten transcripts.

=== Brooklyn ===
The central Chabad publishing house in Brooklyn, Kehot Publication Society, republished Toras Chaim in 1974, 1993 and 2004. The 2004 edition is a 1,812 page, three-volume set; the Exodus treatises have been typeset and all treatises include extensive footnotes and annotations.
