= Menachem Mendel Futerfas =

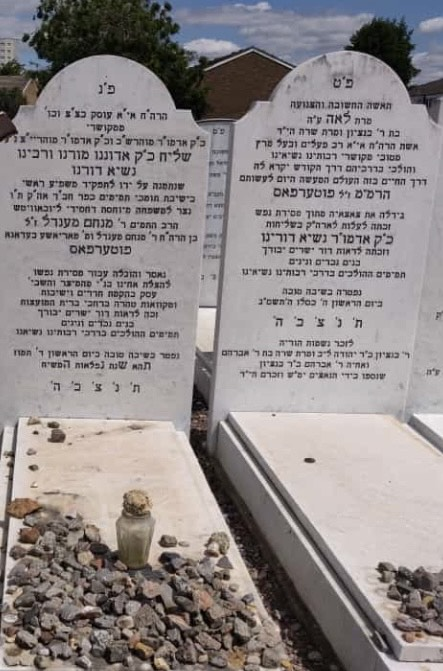
Gravesite of Rabbi Menachem Mendel Futerfas

Rabbi Menachem Mendel Futerfas (22 September 1907 – 2 July 1995) known informally as Reb Mendel, was a Chabad Mashpia and Chossid.

== Activities ==
Futerfas operated clandestine Jewish Cheders in the Soviet Union, for which he was incarcerated for 14 years in Siberian Gulag labor camps. Much of his experiences in the Gulags are told in his book My Gulag Life.

After leaving Russia, the Lubavitcher Rebbe, Menachem Mendel Schneerson, instructed him to serve as Mashpia in the Yeshiva of Tomchei Temimim in Kfar Chabad, in Israel. He arrived there in the summer of 1973 where his farbrengens were famous.

He died on July 2, 1995, and is buried in London.

== Notable students ==
- Herman Branover
