= Toward a Meaningful Life =

Book by Simon Jacobson

- Author: Simon Jacobson
- Original title: Toward a Meaningful Life: The Wisdom of the Rebbe Menachem Mendel Schneerson
- Language: English
- Subject: Jewish thought, Chassidism
- Genre: Non-fiction
- Published: 1995, William Morrow (first edition), Harper Collins
- Publication place: United States
- ISBN: 9780688141967

Toward a Meaningful Life is a book authored by Chabad Hasidic writer Simon Jacobson. The book became the basis of a six-part course titled Toward a Meaningful Life: A Soul-Searching Journey for Every Jew by the Jewish Learning Institute. The book elucidates the teachings of Rabbi Menachem Mendel Schneerson, the seventh Rebbe of Chabad.

== Concepts ==
Toward a Meaningful Life expounds on ideas in Chabad philosophy and especially the teachings of the seventh Chabad Rebbe, Rabbi Menachem Mendel Schneerson.

One of the central concepts explored by Jacobson is the soul. According to Jacobson, the soul is divine energy, "the flame of God," "a little piece of the infinite that lies within you."

Faith is considered a central component for the social order. According to the book, life without faith would be "a random series of logical and illogical errors."

Giving charity is seen by Jacobson as more than a physical act. Becoming a giver and a contributor to life sanctifies one's life, as the giver has the potential to become a partner in the creation and development of the universe.
