= Yitzchak Eizik Epstein =

Chabad Rabbi

Yitzchak Eizik Epstein of Homel
- Born: Yitzchak Eizik Ben Mordechai Halevi Epstein; 1770
- Died: 1857; Homel (Gomel), White Ruthenia
- Occupation: Rabbi
- Known for: Sh'tei HaMeorot (Brooklyn, 1971), Chanah Ariel (Berditchov, 1912)
- Children: Yaakov Yosef

Yitzchak Eizik Halevi Epstein was a rabbi and scholar associated with the Chabad Hassidic movement. He served as the rabbi of the Chabad community in Homel, White Russia. In the Chabad community, he is known as Reb Aizel Homiler (or Reb Eizik Homiler).

== History ==
Rabbi Yitzchak Eizik Epstein was born in 1770 and joined the Chabad Hassidic movement during the lifetime of the first Chabad Rebbe, Rabbi Schneur Zalman of Liadi. Rabbi Epstein later served as the Av Beth Din in Homel in White Russia for over 50 years. Rabbi Yitzchak Eizik was a leading Hassidic figure during the first three generations of Chabad Hassidism. He authored a number of works on the subject of Chabad philosophy including Sh'tei HaMeorot (Brooklyn, 1971) and Chanah Ariel (Berditchov, 1912).

== Family ==
Rabbi Yitzchak Eizik's father was Rabbi Mordechai Halevi Epstein. His grandfather was Rabbi Dovid Halevi Epstein, chief rabbi of Lutsk. Rabbi Yitzchak Eizik had one son, Yaakov Yosef.

== Rabbi of Homel ==
In 1805 Rabbi Yitzchak Eizik was appointed as rabbi of the Hassidic community in Homel. He held the position for over 50 years, until his death in 1857. Rabbi Yitzchak Eizik was also head of the yeshiva in Homel, as well the kollel.

== Works ==
- Maamer Sh'tei HaMeorot (Brooklyn, 1971)
- Chanah Ariel commentary on the Pentateuch (Berditchov, 1912)
- Maamer Yetzias Mitzraim (Vilna 1877)
- Maamer Hashiflus V'hasimcha (Warsaw, 1868)

== See also ==
- Hillel Paritcher, a contemporary of Rabbi Epstein
