= Hatomim =

Chabad journal

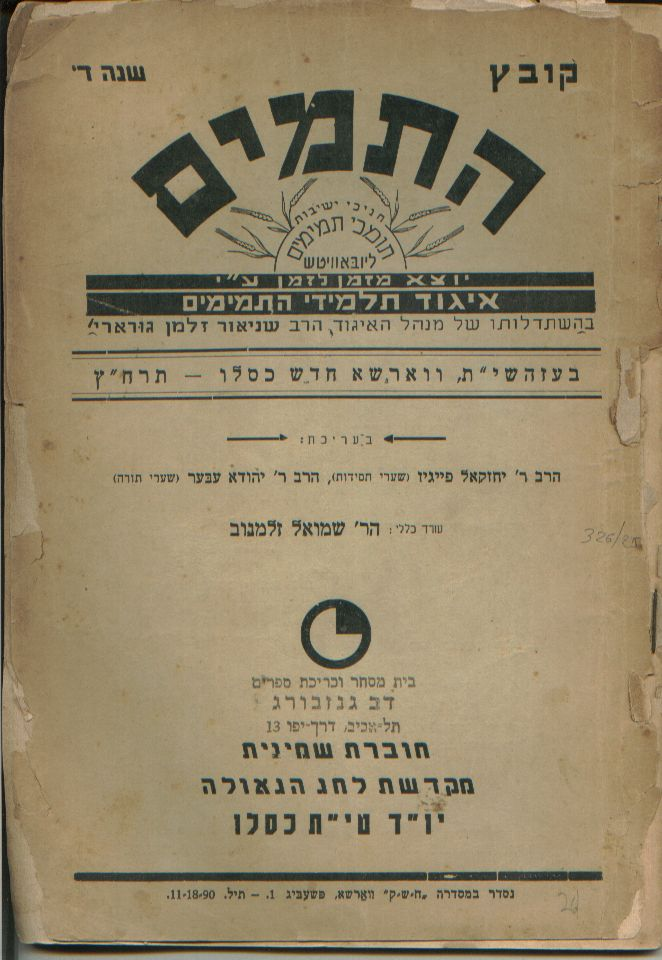
- Discipline: Chabad philosophy, Talmud
- Language: Hebrew, Yiddish
- Edited by: Rabbis Yechezkal Faigen, Yehuda Eber, Shmuel Zalmanov

Publication details
- History: 1935-1938
- Publisher: Yeshivas Tomchei Tmimim Lubavitch (Poland)

Standard abbreviations
- ISO 4: Hatomim

Hatomim (Hebrew: התמים) was a scholarly journal published by the Chabad-Lubavitch Hasidic movement. The journal was published under the direction of the sixth Rebbe of Chabad, Rabbi Yosef Yitzchak Schneersohn. The journal published articles on Chabad philosophy and Talmud.

== History ==
Hatomim was the first Hasidic publication to publish a photograph of a Hasidic Rebbe. The first was a portrait-photograph of Rabbi Yosef Yitzchak Schneersohn, the sixth Chabad Rebbe. It was published in a 1936 edition marking the Rebbe's liberation from Soviet imprisonment.

== Editors ==
The editors-in-chief of Hatomim were:

- Rabbi Yechezkal Faigen, Chassidism
- Rabbi Yehuda Eber, Talmud
- Rabbi Shmuel Zalmanov, General editor

The seventh Chabad Rebbe, Rabbi Menachem Mendel Schneerson, was also involved in editing the journal.

== Publication ==
The journal ran from 1935 to 1938 and a collection of Hatomim was later reprinted in book form by the central Chabad publishing house, Kehot Publication Society. Editions of Hatomim include:

- Kfar Chabad, Israel (1971)
- Brooklyn, New York (1975)
