= Ayin Beis =

Chabad book

Sefer Hamamaarim 5672 (Hemshech Ayin Beis)
- Author: Rabbi Sholom Dovber Schneersohn, the Fifth Rebbe of Chabad
- Language: Hebrew
- Subject: Jewish mysticism, Chabad philosophy
- Genre: Non-fiction
- Published: 1977, Kehot Publication Society

Sefer Hamamaarim 5672 (Hebrew: ספר המאמרים תרע״ב), or Ayin Beis, is a compilation of the Chasidic treatises by Rabbi Sholom Dovber Schneersohn, the fifth Rebbe of Chabad, from the Hebrew year 5672 (1911–12). This series of Chassidic essays are considered a fundamental work of Chabad mysticism for its original treatment of many Chassidic concepts. The Ayin Beis series is one of the single longest works of Chabad philosophy. The work is also referred to as Hemshech Ayin Beis ("Ayin Beis Series").

== History ==
On May 22, 1912 (6 Sivan 5672), Rabbi Sholom Dovber Schneersohn, the fifth Rebbe of the Chabad-Lubavitch Hasidic movement began delivering a series of public sermons on Jewish mysticism and Chabad philosophy. This series was written and delivered over the course of eight years. In its final form, the series consists of 144 discourses, a number of which were never delivered publicly.

The discourse series is formally known as Hemshech Tov Reish Ayin Beis ("Series of 5672", the year when the discourse began), or Hemshech Ayin Beis. Hemshech Ayin Beis was first printed in 1977 at the request of the seventh Chabad Rebbe, and was transcribed from the original manuscript. A partial English edition appeared in a Chabad publication in 2012 in honor of the series Centennial year.

=== Series style ===
Ayin Beis is styled as a series of discourses. Though Rabbi Shalom Dovber's Samech Vov and Ayin Beis are the more well known Chabad discourse series, the "Hemshech style" was first developed by the fourth Rebbe of Chabad, Rabbi Shmuel Schneersohn.

== 100th anniversary ==
Ayin Beis received renewed interest in the Chabad community in 2012, the series's Centennial year.
