= Yoel Kahn =

Chabad rabbi (1930–2021)

- יואל כהן
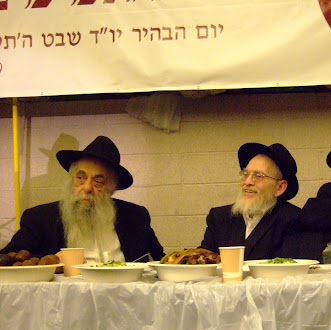
- Kahn (left) in 2006
- Born: February 14, 1930; Moscow, Soviet Union
- Died: July 15, 2021 (aged 91)
- Occupation: Rabbi
- Known for: Choizer of the Lubavitcher Rebbe

Yoel Kahn (Hebrew: יואל כהן; February 14, 1930 – July 15, 2021) was a senior Chabad rabbi who worked for the Lubavitcher Rebbe, Menachem Mendel Schneerson.

== Early life ==
He was born in Moscow, on February 14, 1930. He was the youngest of four children born to Refoel Nachman Kahan and his wife Rivka Davidson . His father studied in the original Yeshiva Tomchei Temimim, in the town of Lubavitch, White Russia and wrote Shemu'os VeSippurim a multi-volume compilation of accounts and anecdotes culled from the traditions handed down by Chassidim of earlier generations and his own experiences.

In 1935, Kahn emigrated to Mandatory Palestine together with his family, and studied in Yeshiva Achai Temimim in Tel Aviv under Rabbi Chaim Shaul Brook. During his teen years he also studied privately with the Rabbi Moshe Gourarie. He also knew and was influenced by Rabbi Nochum Goldshmidt and to a lesser degree, by Rabbi Shlomo Chaim Kesselman.

== New York ==
In 1950, Kahn went to New York to study at the central Yeshiva Tomchei Temimim at 770 Eastern Parkway in Brooklyn, New York.

In 1954, he married Leah Butman.

For decades Kahn served as the main choizer, repeater for Rabbi Menachem Mendel Schneerson, the seventh rebbe of Chabad. He listened to Schneerson's talks and then, after consultation with colleagues, repeated them to Schneerson's Hasidim to transcribe them for print.

Following Schneerson's death, he continued to serve as the senior Mashpia (spiritual guide) in the central Lubavitcher yeshiva at 770 Eastern Parkway. He was referred to familiarly amongst Chabad Chasidim as Reb Yoel.

== Death ==
Rabbi Kahn died on July 15, 2021. He had no children.

== Works ==
- Biurim U'Pninim on Tanya (HaMa'or She'baTorah)
- Sefer Ha'Erchim (main editor and compiler - Kehot)
- Nos'im BaChassidut (Eishel-Kfar Chabad)
- Mahutam Shel Yisroel (Heichal Menachem)
- Shiurim BeTorat Chabad (Ma'ayanotecha)
- HaModaim B'Chassidut (Ma'ayanotecha)
- Sugyot B'Chassidut (Ma'ayanotecha)
- Shiurim Al Sha'ar Yichud V'Ha'Emuna (Ma'ayanotecha)
- Nos'im BaYahadut (tape series)
- Machshevet haChassidut (The philosophy of Chassidut, 2 volumes)
