= Algemeiner Journal =

American newspaper

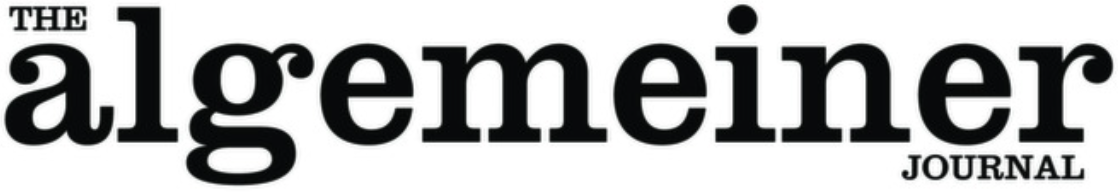

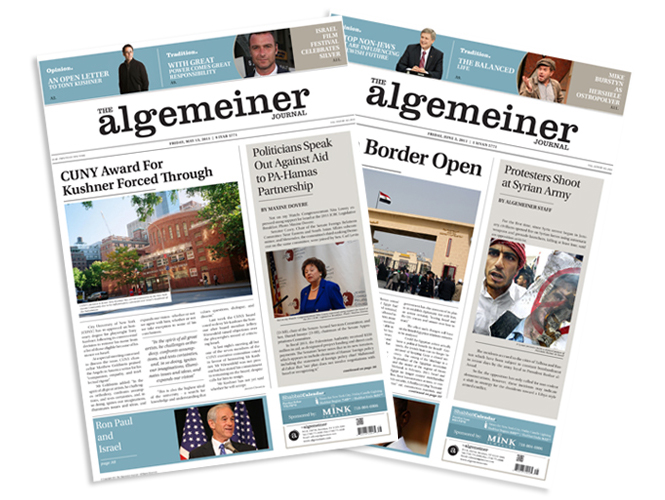
- Type: Weekly newspaper
- Format: Tabloid
- Owner: Gershon Jacobson Jewish Continuity Foundation
- Founder: Gershon Jacobson
- Publisher: Simon Jacobson
- Editor: Aaron Kliegman
- Founded: 1972
- Headquarters: Brooklyn, New York City, US
- Circulation: 23,000
- Website: www.algemeiner.com

The Algemeiner Journal, known informally as The Algemeiner, is a newspaper based in New York City that covers American and international Jewish and Israel-related news. It is widely read by Hasidic Jews.

== History ==
Gershon Jacobson, a former reporter for the New York Herald Tribune, founded the Yiddish-language Der Algemeiner Journal (דער אַלגעמיינער זשורנאַל, 'The Universal Journal') after consulting the Lubavitcher Rebbe Menachem Mendel Schneerson. Der Algemeiner Journal intended to fill the gap after the daily Yiddish paper Der Tog Morgen Zhurnal closed in 1971.

Der Algemeiner Journal Corporation published the inaugural issue on February 23, 1972. The ten-page paper was priced at 25 cents. Twenty thousand issues were printed. The corporation's goal was to promote Jewish identity and information to American Jewry. Jacobson had earlier written and served as its city editor. The largest-circulation Yiddish weekly in the United States, Der Algemeiner Journal emphasized Jewish community news, with a politically independent viewpoint, including reporting on tensions between rival Hasidic sects. Although Jacobson was a Lubavitcher Chasid, according to The New York Times, he "defied easy categorization."

At its peak, Der Algemeiner's circulation neared 100,000. In 1989, in response to the increasing marginalization of Yiddish in the Jewish community, Der Algemeiner Journal began printing a four-page English supplement in the middle of the paper, attracting a more diverse Jewish audience.

The Algemeiner's advisory board was chaired by Nobel laureate, writer, and activist Elie Wiesel.

Jacobson served as the paper's editor and publisher until his death in 2005, and Gershon's elder son Simon Jacobson became the publisher. He founded the Gershon Jacobson Jewish Continuity Foundation (GJCF), a Jewish media organization with the mission to serve as a voice for Jews and Israel. At this time, circulation was approximately 18,000.

In 2008, Jacobson reconceived Der Algemeiner Journal as an English-language publication, replacing the Yiddish "Der" in the title for "The". That year, Dovid Efune became the editor-in-chief of what was called The Algemeiner and Director of the GJCF. Efune left his position in November 2021 to join The New York Sun, but remained on the board.

In 2012, the GJCF launched the website Algemeiner.com.

== Content and circulation ==
The Algemeiner print edition is published every Friday, except during Passover and Sukkot. In 2023, its circulation is about 23,000. It is widely read by Hasidic Jews, for whom Yiddish is the daily language.

During the United States presidency of George H. W. Bush, Algemeiner had among the harshest editorial lines on the Bush administration's efforts in the Israel-Palestinian peace process to roll back settlements. This perspective placed the publication outside the Jewish mainstream at the time.

In 2020, Reuters reported that Algemeiner, The Times of Israel, and The Jerusalem Post had published op-eds credited to "Oliver Taylor", a fabricated "reporter" whose identity could not be verified and was thought to be "created by similar machine learning methods used to create deepfakes". One of "Taylor's" op-eds called Mazen Masri, a legal scholar at City University London, and his wife, Ryvka Barnard, a Palestinian human rights activist, "known terrorist sympathizers", which both denied.

In 2020, Algemeiner editor-in-chief Dovid Efune said the publication is largely funded by small donors who support the site's message.

== Annual events and lists ==
The Algemeiner began hosting its "Jewish 100" gala in 2014, an elaboration on its annual dinner. Donald Trump and Melissa Rivers headlined the 2015 event, presenting short speeches and accepting awards for Algemeiner's recognition of their support of the Jewish people and Israel. The Algemeiner unveils its annual "J100" list at a gala, honoring 100 people that have positively influenced Jewish life.

== See also ==
- The Forward
