= Meir Eisenstaedter =

Hungarian rabbi, Talmudist and paytan

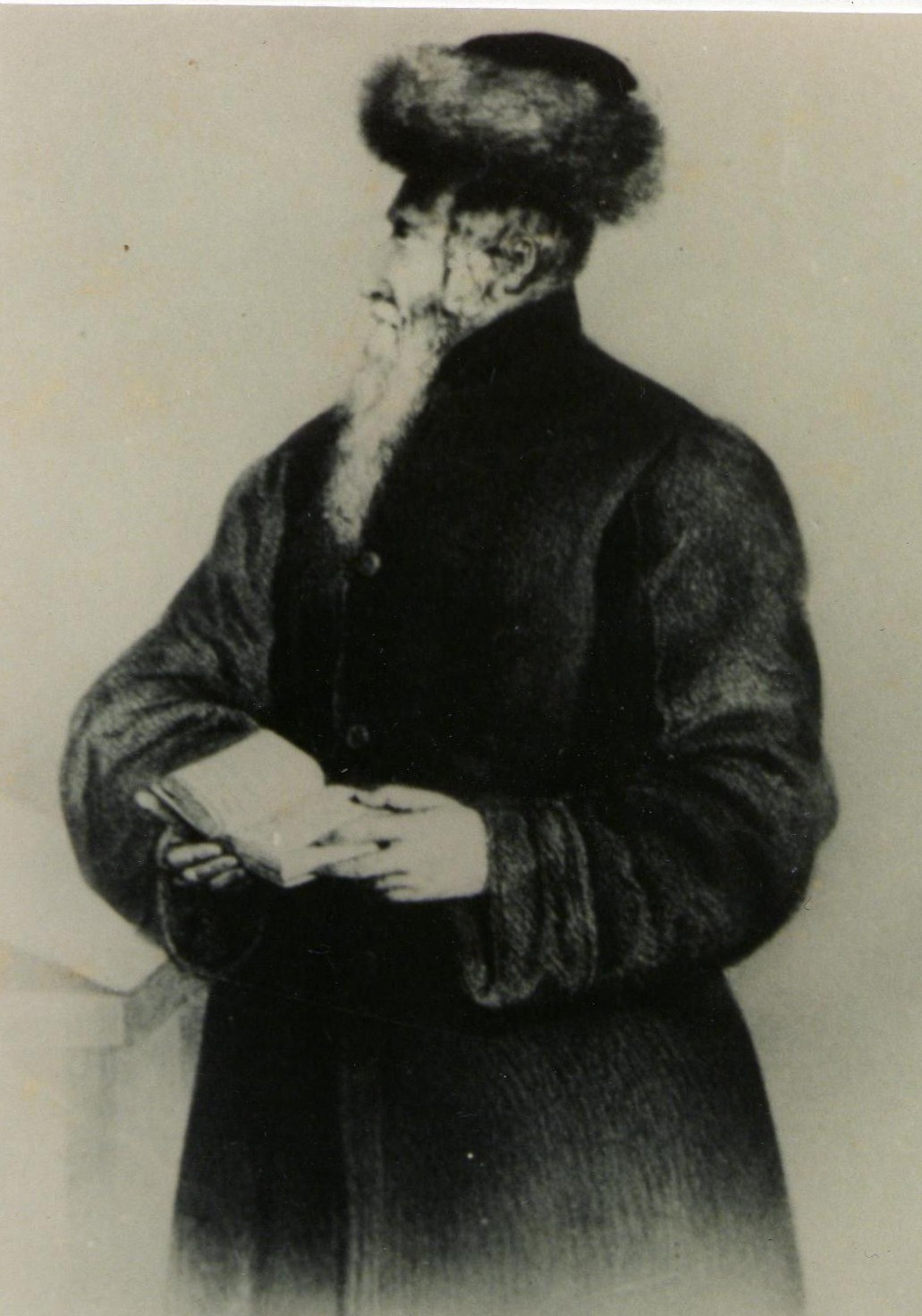
Rabbi Meir Eisenstaedter

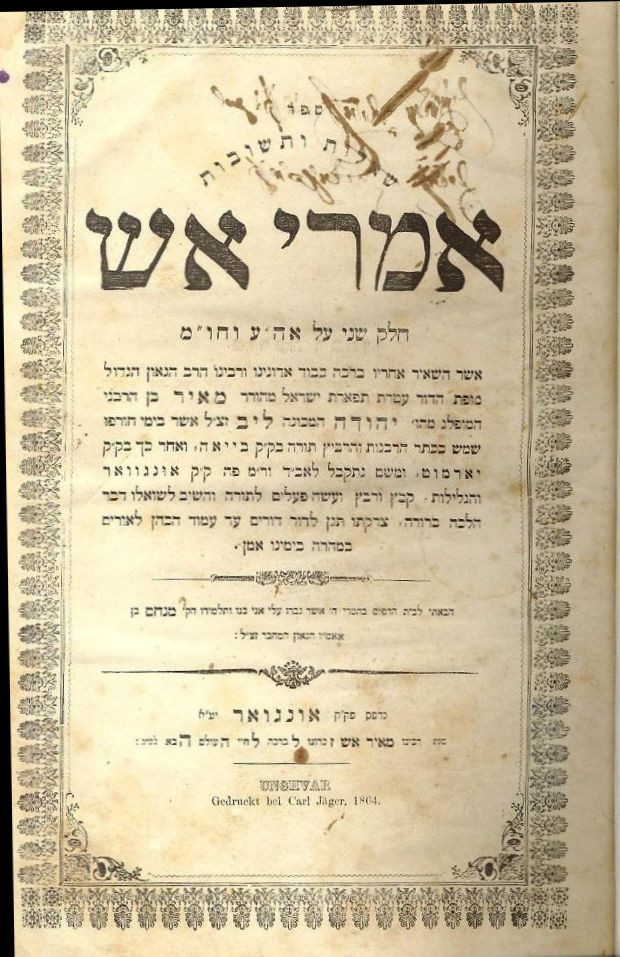
Imre Esh Title page of 1864 edition

Meir Eisenstaedter (Meir ben Judah Leib Eisenstädter, 1780–1852) was a Hungarian rabbi, Talmudist, and paytan (liturgic poet). He is best known as the author of Imre Esh (Words of Fire), the collection of his responsa published by his son in 1864. Eisenstaedter was also known as Maharam Asch (a Hebrew acronym for "Morenu ha-Rav Meir Eisenshtadt" meaning "our teacher, Rabbi Meir Eisenstadt"), Meir Gyarmath, and Meir Ungvar after his later rabbinates.

== Life ==
Eisenstaedter studied at the Mattersdorf yeshiva in Nagymarton, Kingdom of Hungary under Moses Schreiber, a renowned rabbi who later became the chief rabbi of Pressburg (Pozsony, now Bratislava in Slovakia). In his youth Eisenstaedter moved to Kismarton (now Eisenstadt, Austria), from which he took his name.

Eisenstaedter was called to the Baja rabbinate in 1807, where he directed a large yeshiva. He was the intimate friend of Rabbi Götz Schwerin Kohn, who later became the Chief Rabbi of Bács County. When Schwerin's father-in-law was ruined, forcing Schwerin to seek a rabbinate, Eisenstaedter voluntarily reassigned to him the office at Baja, and on the recommendation of the Chatam Sofer, obtained a position for himself at Balassagyarmat, where he served between 1815 and 1835. In 1835 he moved to Ungvár, where he held the position of the Chief Rabbi at a large yeshiva until his death.

Eisenstaedter took an active part in Hungarian Jewish communal life and many of the future rabbis of Hungary were his pupils. He vehemently opposed progressives who desired to introduce religious changes and reforms. The greatest rabbis of Hungary and Galicia including Solomon Kluger of Brody, Ḥayyim Halberstam of Neu Sandec (Nowy Sacz in Poland), and Simon Sofer of Kraków addressed their problems to him. Rabbi Shlomo Ganzfried, author of the Kitzur Shulchan Aruch served as dayan (rabbinic judge) during this time in Ungvár.

Eisenstaedter was married to the daughter of David Deutsch, the rabbi of Vágújhely (now Nové Mesto nad Váhom, Slovakia), where he was head of the yeshiva at the time.

Eisenstaedter died on 16 January 1852 (24 Tevet, 5612). His son Menachem replaced him as head of his yeshiva.

== Works ==
Eisenstaedter's major work is called Imrei Esh (Words of Fire). The title is a pun on the abbreviation of Eisenstadt, as E.S means "fire" in Hebrew. Imrei Esh contains his responsa (rabbinic answers to halachic, i.e. Jewish religious questions) and was published by his son in two parts. Other works:

- Imrei Yosher (Words of Honesty) consisted of sermons and was published in Ungvár in 1864.
- Imrei Binah (Words of Wisdom) was a halachic novella about the Seders of Mo'ed and Nashim. It was published in 1866.
- Imrei Esh comments and notes on the weekly Torah portion and the Haggadah of Pesach
