= Samech Vov =

Compilation of Chasidic treatises by Rabbi Sholom Dovber Schneersohn

Yom Tov Shel Rosh HaShanah 5666 (Samech Vov)
- Author: Rabbi Sholom Dovber Schneersohn, the Fifth Rebbe of Chabad
- Language: Hebrew
- Subject: Jewish mysticism, Chabad philosophy
- Genre: Non-fiction
- Published: 2005 (emended edition)
- Pages: 966 (emended hardcover edition)
- ISBN: 9780826660664

Yom Tov Shel Rosh Hashana: 5666 (Hebrew: ספר המאמרים תרס״ו), known in Chasidic reference as Samech Vov, is a compilation of the Chasidic treatises by Rabbi Sholom Dovber Schneersohn, the fifth Rebbe of Chabad, from the Hebrew year 5666 (1905–06). This series of Chassidic essays is considered a fundamental work of Chabad mysticism. The Samech Vov series is one of the single largest works of Chabad philosophy. The work is titled as Yom Tov Shel Rosh Hashana after the opening words of the first treatise. The work is also referred to as Hemshech Samech Vov ("Samech Vov Series").

== Samech Vov Series ==
The Samech Vov series of Chassidic discourses is one of the largest collections of its kind. The central theme in the series is the concept of Dira Betachtonim, the process of "making the world a dwelling place for God". In the Samech Vov series, this idea is pronounced as the ultimate purpose of creation.

The concept of a divine dwelling is attributed to a statement in Midrash Tanchuma, an Talmudic book of homilies, “God had a desire to have a home in the lower world.”

=== Series style ===
Samech Vov is styled as a series of discourses. Though Rabbi Shalom Dovber's Samech Vov and Ayin Beis are the more well known Chabad discourse series, the "Hemshech style" was first developed by the fourth Rebbe of Chabad, Rabbi Shmuel Schneersohn.

== Publication ==
Heshech Samech Vov was published by Kehot Publication Society in 1972. An emended multi-volume edition was published in 2005, also by Kehot. This edition includes comments and explanations by Rabbi Yosef Yitzchak Schneersohn, the sixth Chabad Rebbe, and Rabbi Menachem Mendel Schneerson, the seventh Chabad Rebbe.
