= Sholom Dovber Schneersohn =

Fifth Chabad Rebbe

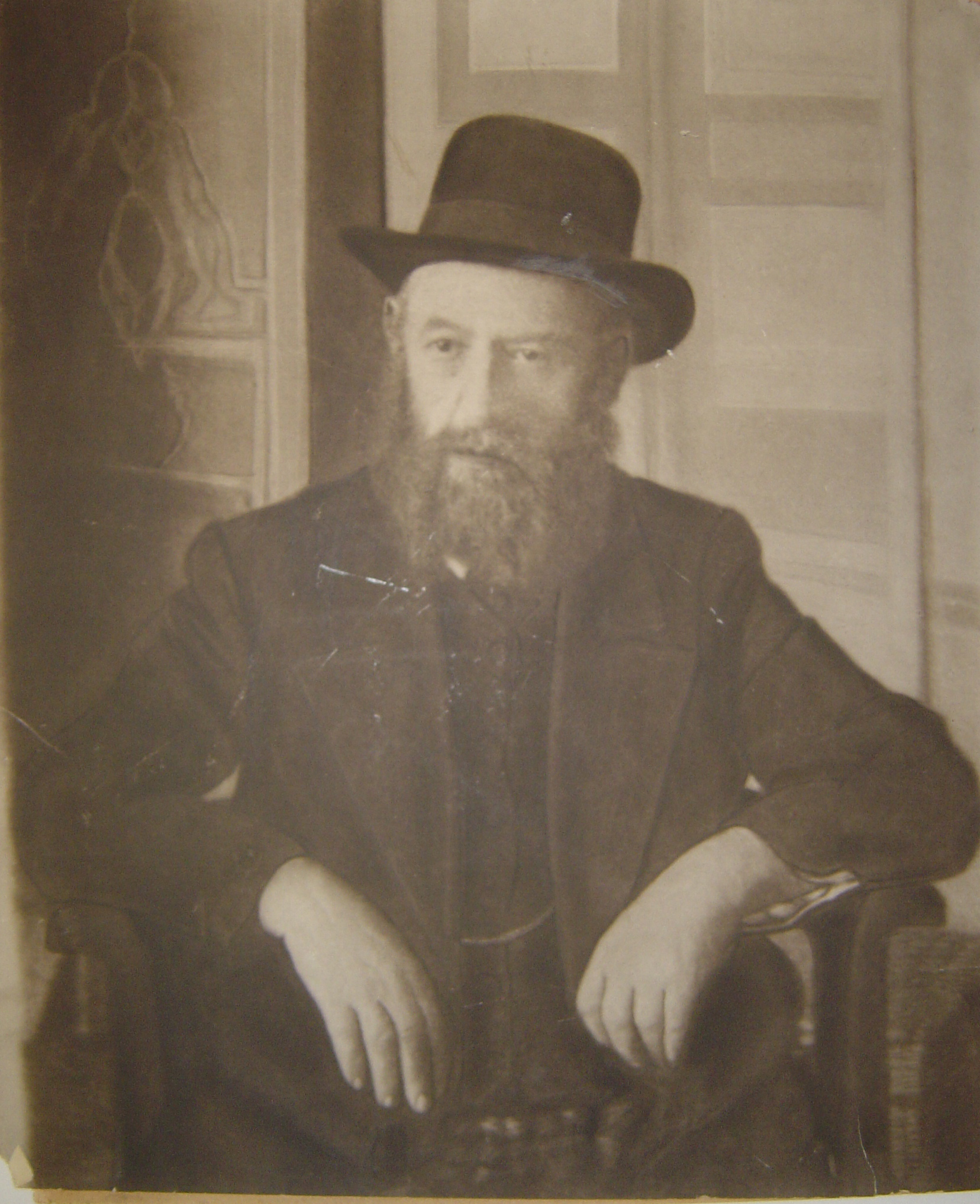
- Sholom Dovber Schneersohn
- Title: Lubavitcher Rebbe

Personal life
- Born: 5 November 1860 OS Lyubavichi, Russian Empire
- Died: 21 March 1920 NS Rostov-on-Don, RSFSR, Soviet Union
- Spouse: Sterna Sarah (daughter of Yosef Yitzchok of Ovruch)
- Children: Yosef Yitzchok Schneersohn
- Parents: Shmuel Schneersohn (father); Rivkah (granddaughter of Dovber Schneuri) (mother)
- Dynasty: Chabad Lubavitch

Religious life
- Religion: Judaism

Jewish leader
- Predecessor: Shmuel Schneersohn
- Successor: Yosef Yitzchak Schneersohn
- Began: 10 September 1892 OS
- Ended: 21 March 1920 NS
- Main work: Yom Tov Shel Rosh Hashana, 5666, Sefer HaMaamarim, 5672
- Dynasty: Chabad Lubavitch

Sholom Dovber Schneersohn (Hebrew: שלום דובער שניאורסאהן; 1860–1920) was the fifth rebbe (spiritual leader) of the Chabad-Lubavitch chasidic movement. He is known as "the Rebbe Rashab" (for Reb Sholom Ber). His teachings that encouraged outreach were further developed later.

== Life ==
=== Early life ===
Schneersohn was born in Lubavitch, on 20 Cheshvan 5621 (5 November 1860), the second son of Shmuel Schneersohn, the fourth Chabad Rebbe. In 1882, when his father died, he was not quite 22 years old, and his brother Reb Zalman Aharon was not much older. A period followed, during which both brothers fulfilled some of the tasks of a rebbe, but neither felt ready to take on the title and responsibilities. Over this period he gradually took on more responsibilities, particularly in dealing with the impact of the May Laws regarding the Jews, and on Rosh Hashanah 5643 (10 September 1892 OS) he accepted the leadership of the Lubavitch movement.

Schneersohn married his cousin, Shterna Sara Schneersohn. She was the daughter of Rabbi Yosef Yitzchok Schneersohn of Avorutch, a son of the Tzemach Tzedek. They had one son whom they named Yosef Yitzchok after Shterna Sara's father. Yosef Yitzchok later succeeded his father as Rebbe

=== Later life ===
In late 1915, as the fighting in World War I neared Lubavitch, Schneersohn deported to Rostov-on-Don. As Bolshevik forces approached Rostov he considered moving to Palestine, which was part of the Ottoman Empire at the time, and prepared all the necessary paperwork; his only extant picture comes from his Turkish visa since he usually refused to be photographed. But eventually, he decided to stay in Rostov, where he died on 21 March 1920 (2 Nisan 5680).

During the construction of the "Rostov Palace of Sport" on top of the Old Jewish Cemetery in 1940, his remains were secretly moved by a religious group of Chassidim to a different burial site where they are located to this day in the "Rostov Jewish Cemetery." His grave is visited daily by followers of the Chabad-Lubavitch movement, who come from all over the world.

== Leadership ==
Schneersohn established the first Chabad yeshiva, Tomchei Temimim, in 1897. In 1911 he established another yeshivah, Toras Emes, in Israel, and in 1916 he established a yeshivah in Georgia. Avrum Erlich has argued that it was these institutions that made Lubavitch the dominant of the various Chabad Hasidic movements.

He maintained a lengthy correspondence, not only with Chabad Chasidim in other countries, but also with non-Chabad chasidim and members of other groups who wrote to him for advice. He also met with other Jewish and Hasidic leaders, working with them on issues such as education, unity, policy, and strategy. He was held in high esteem by the Chofetz Chaim, so much so that the Chofetz Chaim declared of him, "the words of the [Lubavitcher] Rebbe are holy, and anyone who argues [or] disagrees with him [should know that] it is as if he is disagreeing with Moses."

Schneersohn promoted Jewish agricultural settlement, and the creation of employment for Jews, particularly those displaced by the May Laws.

He was a prominent opponent of Zionism, both in its secular and religious versions and a staunch ally of Reb Chaim Brisker. In 1903 he published Kuntres Uma'ayan, which contained a strong polemic against Zionism. He was deeply concerned that secular nationalism would replace Judaism as the foundation of Jewish identity. Together with Reb Chaim he joined and supported Machazikei Hadas - a union of Eastern European haredim and the forerunner of the Agudah - but in 1912, when the Agudah was formed in Katowice, Reb Chaim raised 18 objections to its constitution, and Schneersohn kept Lubavitch out of the Agudah.

After the February Revolution, elections were called for Jewish city councils and a General Jewish Assembly. Schneersohn worked tirelessly to organize a religious front with a center and a special office to deal with it all. For this reason, he called a unique conference of all the Torah giants throughout Russia. This conference was held in 1917 in Moscow, and was preceded by a meeting of the leading Rabbis, to decide the matters to be discussed there. This smaller meeting was held in Petrograd. However, because the participants in this meeting were few and in a hurry to return home, the Moscow conference failed to yield proper results. Thus, it was necessary to convene once again in Kharkiv in 1918, to discuss the elections for the General Jewish Assembly.

His worries about the Mountain Jews led him to send a Mashpia, Rabbi Shmuel Levitin of Rakshik, to the Caucasus to set up institutions to bring them closer to Orthodox observance, setting a precedent for his two successors, who conducted similar activities.

Notable disciples of Schneersohn include R. Levi Yitzchak Schneerson, R. Itche Der Masmid, and R. Zalman Moishe HaYitzchaki. The Malach.

== Chassidic philosophy ==
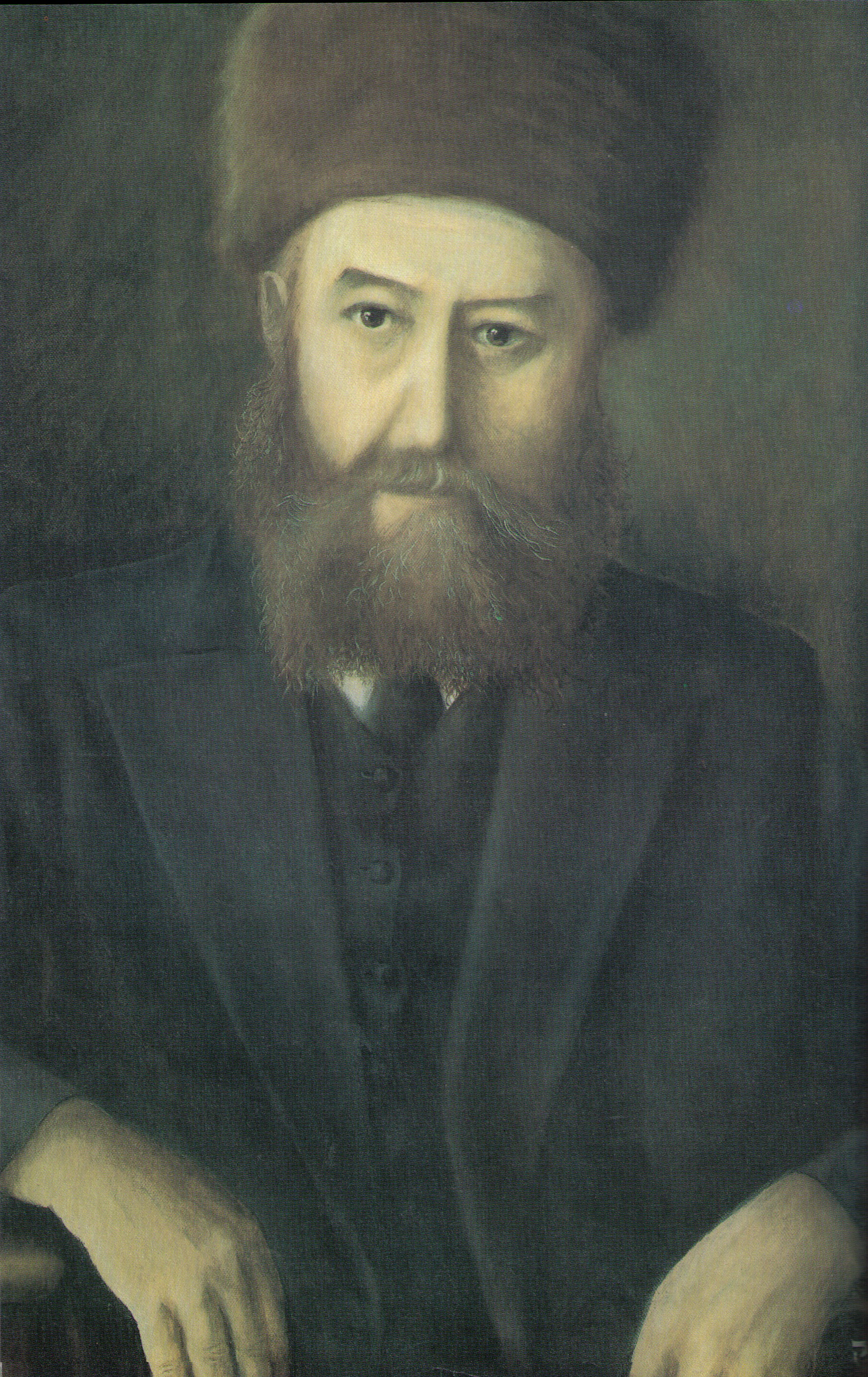
Painting of the Rebbe Rashab

Schneersohn's discourses are associated with a systematic and analytic presentation of Chabad thought. He began recording the discourses of his father, Rabbi Shmuel Schneersohn, at the age of twelve, and after his father's death in 1882 he began delivering original discourses of his own. Chabad sources describe him as having written and delivered about 2,000 chassidic discourses over the thirty-eight years of his leadership, including extended series of discourses (hemshechim) on kabbalistic and chassidic concepts.

Among his best-known series are Yom Tov Shel Rosh Hashana 5666 ("Samech Vov") and B'shaah Shehikdimu 5672 ("Ayin Beis"). Chabad.org describes Ayin Beis as one of the longest sequences in Chabad chassidic literature, delivered over four years.

== Published works ==
Schneersohn's discourses and writings were published after his death, chiefly through Kehot Publication Society, under the direction of his son Yosef Yitzchak Schneersohn and later Menachem Mendel Schneerson.

- Sefer HaMa'amarim - a 31-volume set of Chasidic discourses, according to the years set. The most important of these include two three-year-long cycle of discourses beginning "Yom Tov Shel Rosh Hashanah 5666" ("Samech-Vov") and "B'shaah Shehikdimu 5672 (Ayin-Beis)". They serve today as major in-depth encyclopedic introductory works into "oral" Chabad Chassidism (as opposed to the "written" one, i.e., Tanya) studied in Chabad yeshivas.
- Igros Kodesh - six volume set of letters
- Toras Sholom - compilation of public addresses
- Kuntres Uma'ayan - basic Chasidic text on self-transformation (as opposed to self-nullification as taught in Musar philosophy) and battling evil desires in an intellectual, Kabbalah-based way
- Kuntres HaTefillah - explanation of Chabad Chasidic prayer
- Kuntres HoAvodah - even more in-depth analysis of Chabad Chasidic prayer
- Maamar Veyadaata - To know G-d, explanation of the unity of God with the created Universe and how to reach the understanding and appreciation of it
- Maamar Heichaltzu - On Ahavas Yisroel, mystical aspects, sources and reasons for a love to a fellow Jew (and explanation of how exactly the dictum of loving one's fellow as oneself is the basis of all the Torah, including seemingly not related areas of it)
- Kuntres Eitz HaChayim - The Tree of Life—essay on the importance of learning (how learning of Judaism can transform a Jew's life and personality and change his perception on his purpose in life), order of learning (for Chabad yeshivah students), and focus of Jewish learning.
- Chanoch Lana'ar - The Ethical Will
- "Hagaos" Scholarly glosses on Tanya, The Siddur, Torah Ohr and Likkutei Torah
- Issa B'Midrash Tehillim - Bar Mitzvah Maamar—mystical aspects of the commandment of tefillin; a Chasidic discourse usually recited by a Chabad boy at his bar mitzvah
- Some of his published works in Hebrew

=== Publication gallery ===
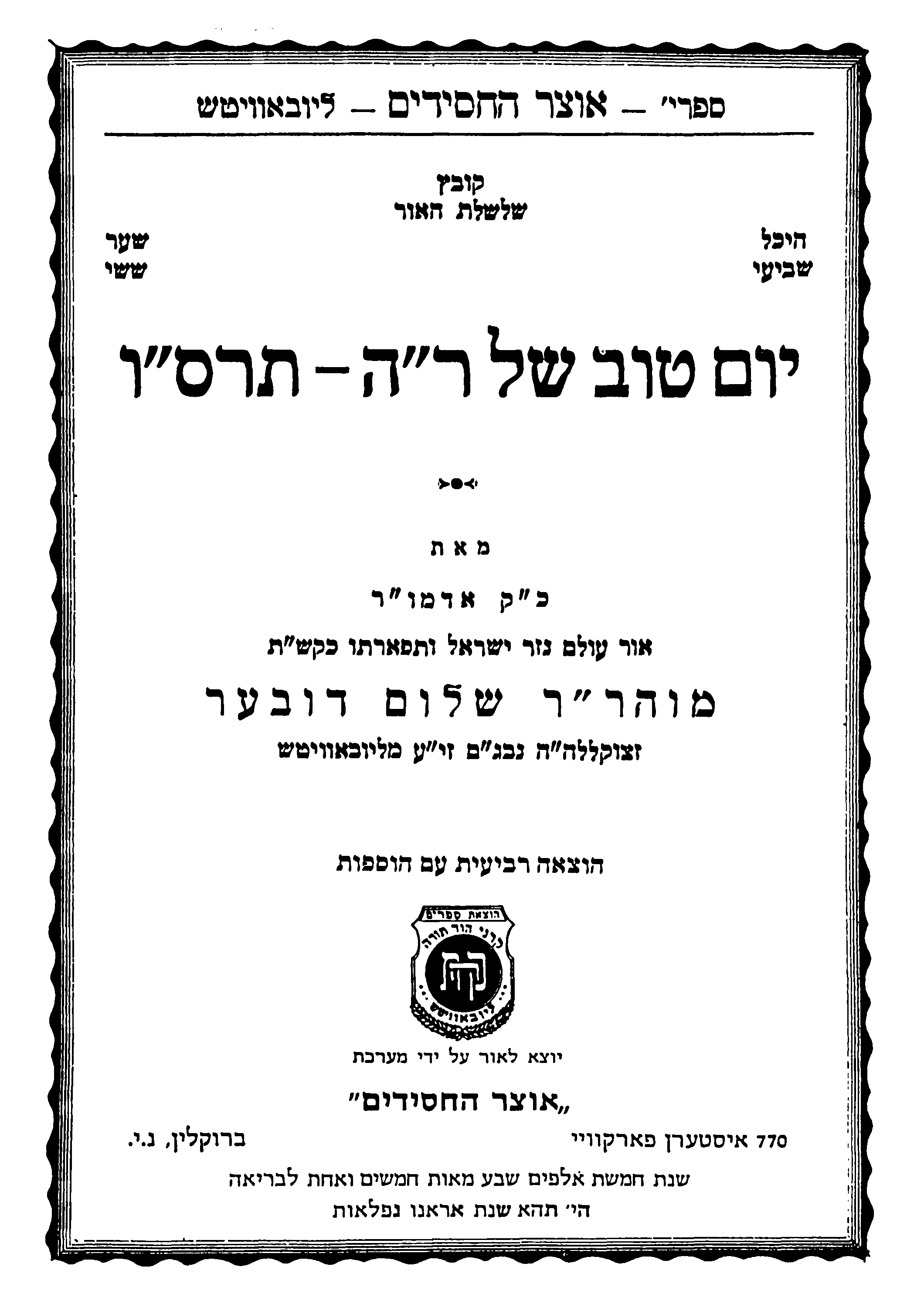
1906 collection of essays

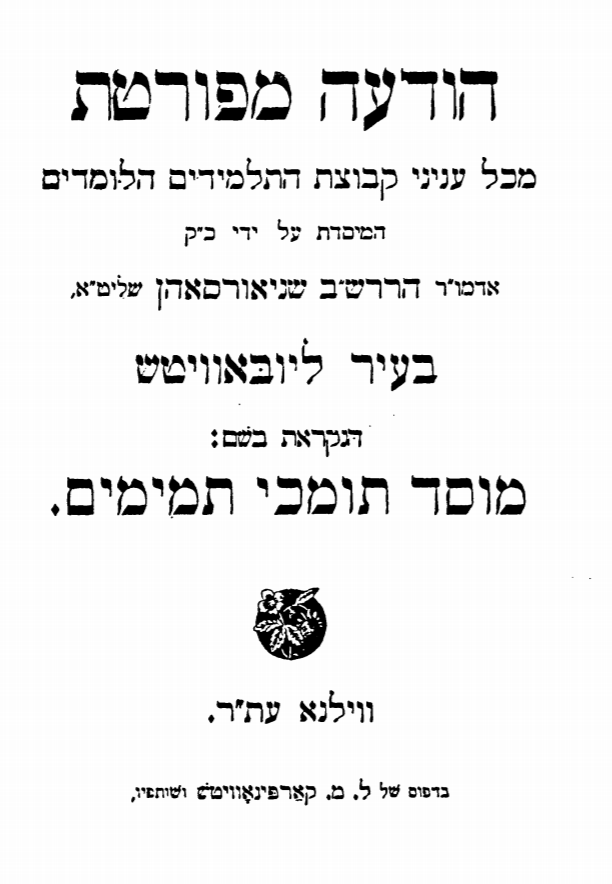
Publication of Rashab's Yeshiva (1909)

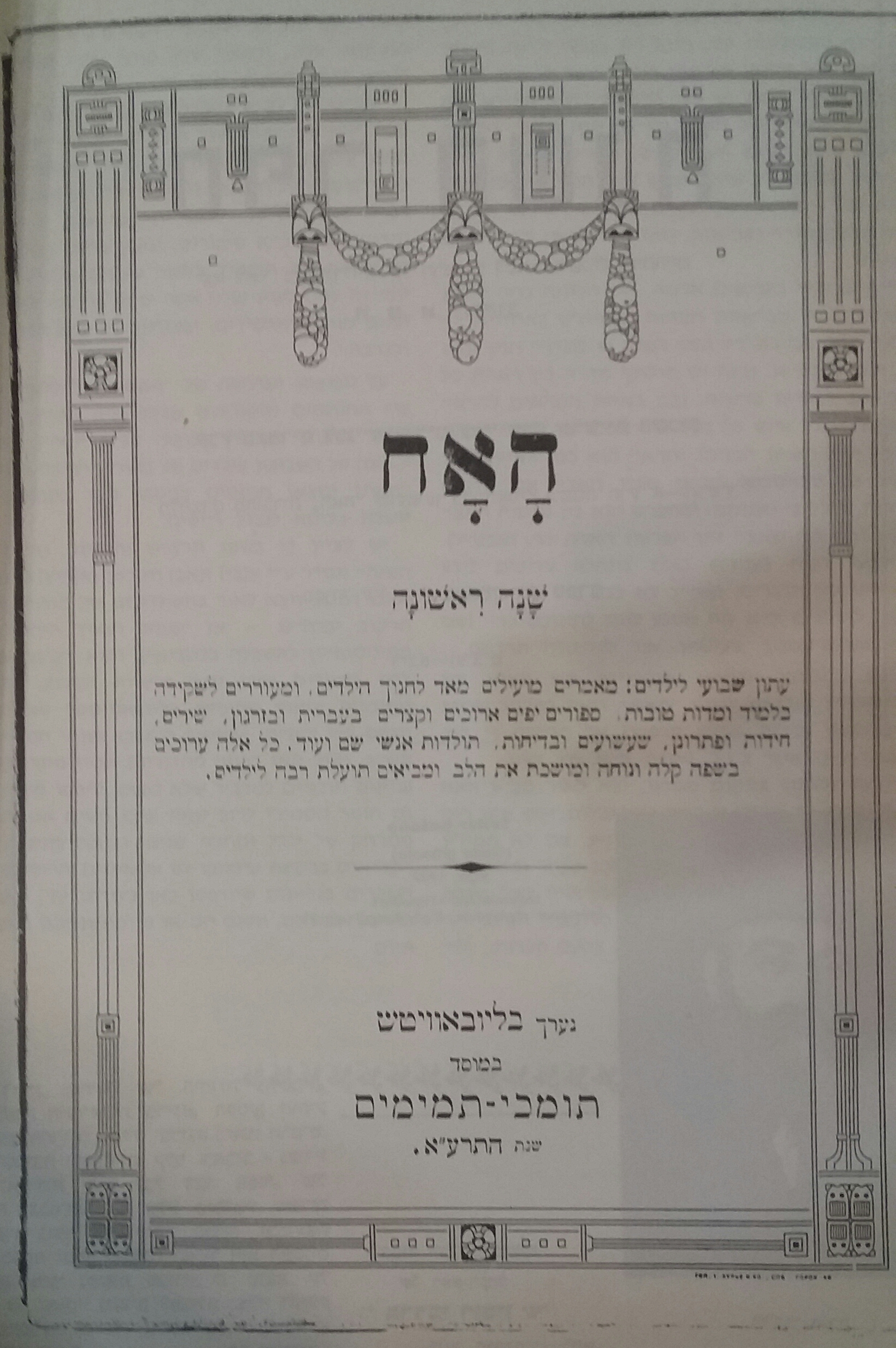
Huh-Ukh, a newspaper by Rashab's yeshiva (1911)

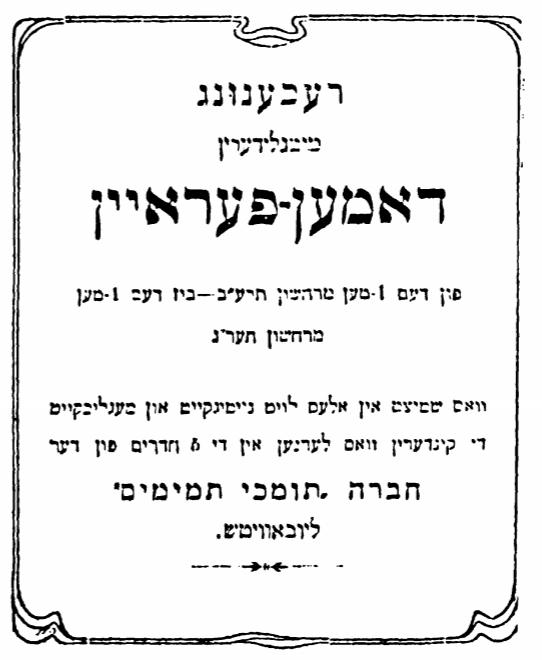
Women's Auxiliary Group led by wife of Rashab (1912)

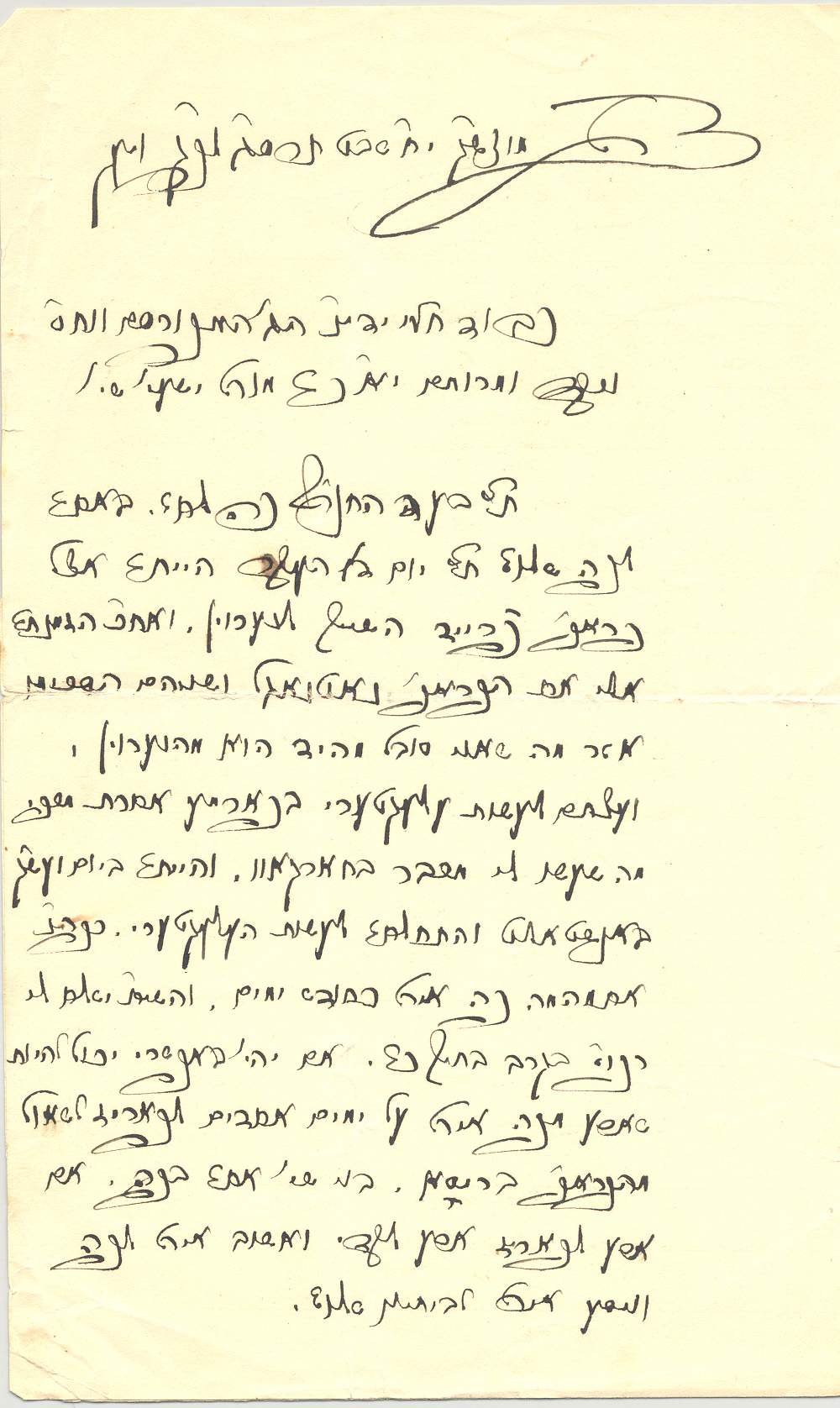
Letter from Rashab

== Citations ==
Religious titles
Preceded by Shmuel Schneersohn	Rebbe of Lubavitch; 1892–1920	Succeeded by Yosef Yitzchok Schneersohn
