= Simon Jacobson =

American rabbi

Simon Jacobson (born December 8, 1956) is the author of Toward a Meaningful Life (William Morrow, 2002) and publisher of the weekly Algemeiner Journal. Jacobson is a member of the Chabad-Lubavitch movement.

== Life and early career ==
Jacobson was born in Brooklyn, New York, to a Chabad Hasidic family. He studied at the United Lubavitcher Yeshiva and the Rabbinical College of America, and did his post-graduate studies in Central Tomchei Tmimim. While in yeshiva, Jacobson began working extensively as a choizer (transcriber) for the talks of Rabbi Menachem Mendel Schneerson, the seventh Chabad rebbe.

== Career ==
In 1979, Jacobson began directing a team of scholars known as Vaad Hanachos Hatemimim that memorized and transcribed ("meiniach") entire talks that the Lubavitcher Rebbe gave during the Sabbath and holidays (when writing and tape recording are not permitted under Jewish Law). This team published more than 1,000 of the Rebbe's talks.

Jacobson was also part of the research team for Sefer HaLikkutim – an encyclopedic collection of Hasidic Jewish thought anthologized from the works of Menachem Mendel Schneersohn, the third Chabad rebbe (26 volumes, published 1977–1982).

Jacobson heads The Meaningful Life Center, described as a "spiritual Starbucks" by The New York Times.

=== Publications ===
Jacobson is the author of the book Toward a Meaningful Life, a William Morrow publication that has sold more than 300,000 copies and has been translated into Hebrew, French, Spanish, Dutch, Portuguese, Italian, Russian, German, Hungarian, Polish and Czech.

Jacobson is also the publisher of The Algemeiner. Many of his writings are syndicated on the Chabad website, Chabad.org

== Publications ==
=== Books ===
- Toward a Meaningful Life, 1995 ISBN 978-0-9612088-1-3
- Spiritual Guide to Counting the Omer, 1996 ISBN 0-06-051190-7
- 60 DAYS: A Spiritual Guide to the High Holidays, 2003 ISBN 1-886587-24-8

== Personal life ==
Jacobson married on February 21, 1983, and has two children. His brother is Yosef Yitzchak Jacobson, a world renowned rabbi and dean and Rosh Yeshiva of TheYeshiva.net.

== See also ==
- Manis Friedman
- Tzvi Freeman
- Avraham Fried
