= Reb (Yiddish) =

Yiddish honorary title

Reb (Yiddish: רב, /ˈrɛb/) is a Yiddish or Hebrew honorific traditionally used for Orthodox Jewish men. It is not a rabbinic title. In writing it is abbreviated as ר׳. On a gravestone, ב'ר is an abbreviation for ben/bat reb meaning "son/daughter of the worthy..." Reb may also be a short form of Rebbe. It is generally only used for married men, sometimes an equivalent of "Mr."

A never-married man is referred to as Habachur.

== History ==
The title was adopted by Jews at the time of the schism with the Karaites, as a sign of loyalty to Rabbinic Judaism.

== Usage ==
When addressing someone directly, Reb is usually used with the first name only ("May I help you, Reb Chaim?"). In other circumstances, it can be used with either the first name or the full name ("This is Reb Chaim Jacobs."; "Would you please help Reb Chaim?"). In formal written address, it is usually used along with the full name.
