= Dovber Schneuri =

Second Rebbe of Chabad (1773–1827)

- Title: Lubavitcher Rebbe

Personal life
- Born: Dovber Schneuri; 13 November 1773 OS Liozna
- Died: 16 November 1827 OS Nizhyn
- Buried: Nizhyn
- Spouse: Sheine
- Children: Menachem-Nachum; Boruch; Sarah; Beila Chaya Mushka Schneersohn (wife of Menachem Mendel Schneersohn); Devorah Leah (wife of Yaakov Yisroel Twersky of Cherkasy); Hornosteipel (Hasidic dynasty) Menucha Rachel Slonim; Bracha Sarah
- Parents: Shneur Zalman of Liadi (father); Sterna Segal (mother)
- Dynasty: Chabad Lubavitch

Religious life
- Religion: Judaism

Jewish leader
- Predecessor: Shneur Zalman of Liadi
- Successor: Menachem Mendel Schneersohn
- Began: 15 December 1812
- Ended: 16 November 1827 OS
- Main work: Sha'ar HaYichud, Sha'arei Orah, Toras Chaim
- Dynasty: Chabad Lubavitch

Dovber Schneuri (13 November 1773 – 16 November 1827 OS) was the second Rebbe (spiritual leader) of the Chabad Lubavitch Chasidic movement. Rabbi Dovber was the first Chabad rebbe to live in the town of Lyubavichi (in present-day Russia), the town for which this Hasidic dynasty is named. He is also known as the Mitteler Rebbe ("Middle Rebbe" in Yiddish), being the second of the first three generations of Chabad leaders.

== Biography ==
Rabbi Schneuri was born in Liozna, modern day Belarus, on 9 Kislev 5534. His father, Rabbi Shneur Zalman of Liadi, was Rebbe of the community there, and of multiple Chassidim in White Russia and Lithuania, and other parts of Russia. His father named him after his own teacher, Rabbi Dov Ber of Mezeritch, a disciple and successor of the Baal Shem Tov, the founder of the Chassidic movement. The Yiddish first name דוב-בער Dov-Ber literally means "bear-bear", traceable back to the Hebrew word דב dov "bear" and the German word Bär "bear". It is thus an example of a bilingual tautological name.

In 1788 he married Rebbetzin Sheina, the daughter of a local rabbi. In 1790 Rabbi Dovber was appointed the Mashpia (spiritual guide) of the Hasidim who would come to visit his father. When Schneuri was 39, while studying in the city of Kremenchug, his father died. He then moved to the small border-town of Lubavichi, from which the movement would take its name. His accession was disputed by one of his father's prime students, Rabbi Aharon HaLevi of Strashelye, however the majority of Rabbi Shneur Zalman's followers stayed with Schneuri, and moved to Lubavichi. Thus Chabad had now split into two branches, each taking the name of their location to differentiate themselves from each other. He established a yeshivah in Lubavitch, which attracted gifted young scholars. His son-in-law, who later became his successor, Rabbi Menachem Mendel of Lubavitch, headed the Yeshivah.

Like his father, Schneuri considered it his sacred task to help the Jews of Russia, whether they were Chassidim or not, not only spiritually but also economically. The position of the Jews under the Czars was never easy, but it became much worse when Czar Alexander I was succeeded by Czar Nicholas I in 1825. The restrictions against the Jews increased in number and severity, and the Jews continued to be confined to the Pale of Settlement. They had no right to live, work or do business outside the Pale, where conditions had become difficult in the wake of the Franco-Russian war.

Schneuri thus launched a campaign (in 1822, or 1823) to urge Jews to learn trades and skilled factory work. He urged communities to organize trade schools. He also encouraged the study of agriculture, dairy farming, and the like, reminding them that once upon a time, when the Jewish people lived in their own land, they were a people of farmers, fruit growers, and herdsmen. He urged that boys who did not show promise of becoming Torah scholars should, after the age of 13, devote part of their time to the learning of a trade, or work in the fields, to help support the family.

He organized Jewish agricultural colonies in the Kherson district, raised funds for them, and visited Jewish farmers there.

He was active in the collection and distribution of financial aid from Russia to the Jewish population in the Holy Land. He intended to settle in Hebron himself, believing that this was the "gate of heaven," and prayers to be particularly effective there. He instructed Chabad followers living in the Holy Land to move to the city for this reason.

Like his father, he was informed upon by his enemies, accused of being a danger to the Russian government. He was arrested on charges of having sent 200-300 rubles to the Sultan, and was ordered to appear for a trial in Vitebsk; however, due to the efforts of several non-Jewish friends he was released before the trial. The day of his release, 10 Kislev 5587, is celebrated joyously to this day by Chabad Chassidim.

== Death ==
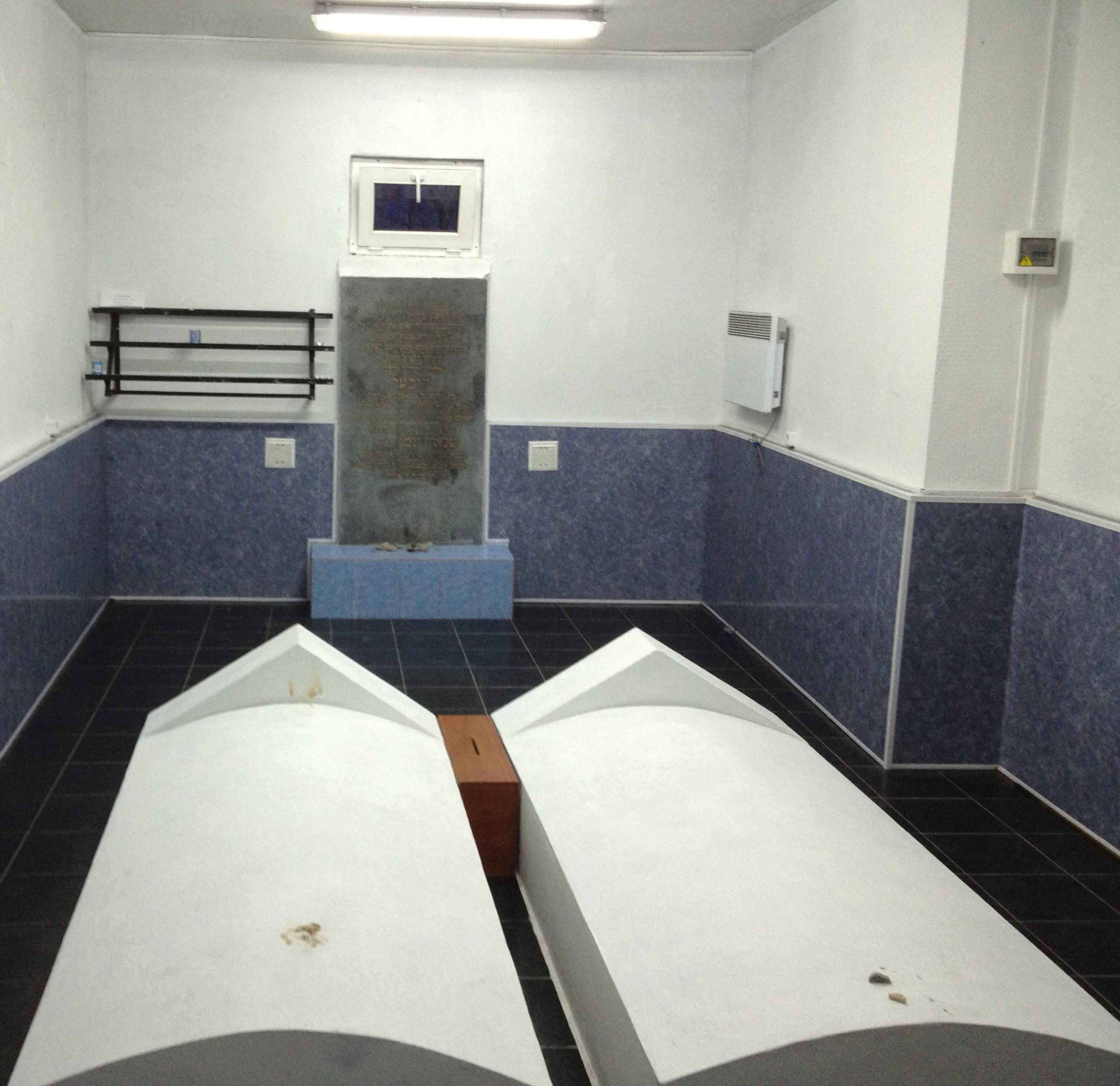
The resting place of Rabbi Dovber Schneuri in Nizhyn, Ukraine

He died in Nizhyn on November 16 1827, on his Hebrew birthday, 9 Kislev.

== Family ==
He had two sons, Menachem Nahum and Baruch, and seven daughters. The oldest of his daughters, Rebbetzin Chaya Mushka, was married to her cousin Menachem Mendel Schneersohn, another grandchild of Schneur Zalman of Liadi. Menachem Mendel succeeded his father-in-law/uncle as Rebbe. Another of his daughters was Menucha Rachel Slonim.

== Works ==
Schneuri wrote works on Chabad philosophy and Kabbalah, including a commentary on the Zohar, Bi'urei HaZohar, and several texts on contemplation and prayer. A biographical account by Nissan Mindel states that about twenty of his works were published, many during his lifetime.

His Kuntres HaHitpa'alut (Tract on Ecstasy), composed in 1813, discusses the Chabad approach to emotional arousal in divine service through meditation and emphasizes inner inspiration over external displays of fervor. Another work, Sha'ar HaYichud (The Gate of Unity), describes the creation and structure of the world according to Kabbalah and presents methods of meditation on these ideas.

=== List of works ===
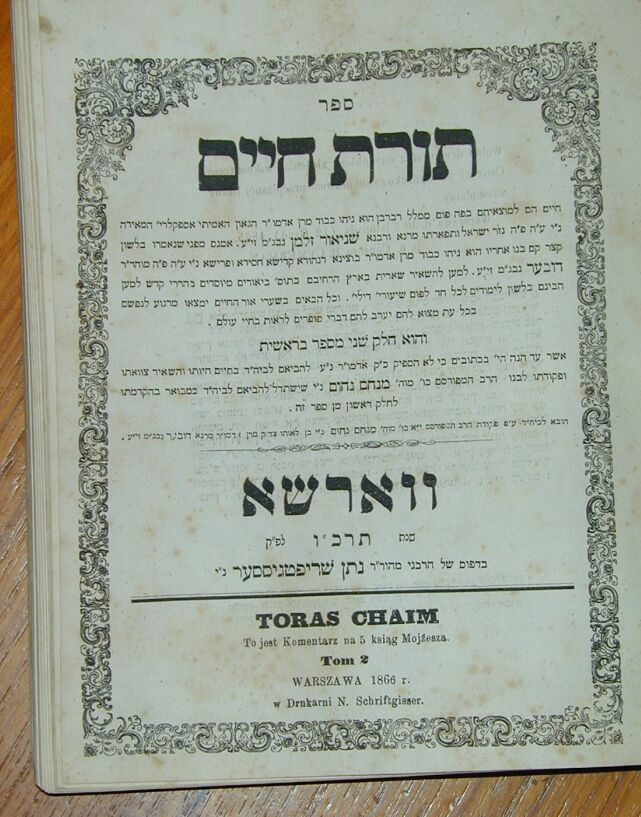
Toras Chaim by Rabbi DovBer. 1866 printing

- Maamarei Admur Ha'emtza'i - Chassidic discourses on the Torah and festivals - 20 vols.
- Bi'urei HaZohar - explanation of the Zohar
- Pirush HaMilos - Chassidic explanation of the liturgy
- Kuntres HaHispaalus - on meditation and ecstasy in prayer; also known as Kuntres HaHisbonenus
- Shaarei Teshuvah - on Teshuvah, repentance
- Derech Chaim - continuation of Shaarei Teshuvah
- Toras Chaim - Chassidic discourses on the books of Bereshis and Shemos
- Ateres Rosh - Chassidic discourses for the Days of Awe
- Shaar HaEmunah - explanation of the Mitzvah of faith and the festival of Pesach
- Shaar HaYichud - explanation of Seder hishtalshelus
- Shaarei Orah - on the festivals of Chanukah and Purim
- Imrei Binah - explanation of the Mitzvah of reading the Shema and donning the Tefillin

== Books ==
- Communicating the Infinite: The Emergence of the Habad School, Naftali Loewenthal, University Of Chicago Press, 1990. Academic survey of the formation of Chabad in its first two generations, describing the divergent spiritual interpretations of DovBer Schneuri and Aharon HaLevi of Strashelye.
- Hasidic Prayer by Louis Jacobs. Littman Library of Jewish Civilization. New edition 1993 (Paperback). Full overview and explanation of forms of prayer across the whole Hasidic movement. Gives detailed explanation of the unique Chabad approach, and its differences from other ways.
- Tract on Ecstasy by Dobh Baer of Lubavitch. Translated into English and introduced by Louis Jacobs. Vallentine Mitchell, London 1963.
- The Schocken Book of Jewish Mystical Testimonies. Compiled and with commentary by Louis Jacobs. Random House. New edition 1998 (Paperback). Puts the "Tract on Ecstasy" into historical context in Judaism.

Religious titles
Preceded by Shneur Zalman of Liadi	Rebbe of Lubavitch; 1812–1827	Succeeded by Menachem Mendel Schneersohn
