= Mashpia =

Hasidic rabbi who serves as a spiritual mentor

Mashpia (Hebrew: משפיע) or feminine Mashpi'oh lit. "person of influence", pl. Mashpi'im (Hebrew: משפיעים) is the title of a rabbi who serves as a spiritual mentor in a Hasidic Jewish yeshiva.

This title is also used in Breslov Hasidic movements, who have no rebbe. Previously, those holding this position were referred to as "community rabbis".

The related Hebrew word "mashpian" refers to an "influencer" such as a celebrity or social media promoter.

== Mashpi'im in Chabad ==
Rabbi Shneur Zalman of Liadi, the first rebbe of Chabad-Lubavitch, discussed the role of mashpi'im in the preface to the Tanya, his book on Hasidic philosophy.
