= Schneersohn =

Schneersohn (or Schneerson) is a Jewish surname used by many of the descendants of Rabbi Shneur Zalman of Liadi, the first Rebbe of the Chabad-Lubavitch Hasidic movement.

== Origins ==
Rabbi Shneur Zalman of Liadi (1745 – 1812) founded the Chabad Hasidic movement in 1775. His son, Rabbi Dovber Schneuri (1773 – 1827), the second Chabad Rebbe, adopted the "Schneuri" surname after his father's first name. The first to use the "Schneersohn" surname was Rabbi Menachem Mendel Schneersohn, the nephew/son-in-law of Rabbi Dovber and the grandson of Rabbi Schneur Zalman and the third Chabad Rebbe.

== People surnamed Schneersohn or Schneerson ==
=== Chabad Rebbes ===
- Rabbi Menachem Mendel Schneersohn (1789 – 1866), the third Chabad-Lubavitch Rebbe
- Rabbi Shmuel Schneersohn (1834 – 1882), the fourth Chabad-Lubavitch Rebbe
- Rabbi Sholom Dovber Schneersohn (1860 – 1920), the fifth Chabad-Lubavitch Rebbe
- Rabbi Yosef Yitzchok Schneersohn (1880 – 1950), the sixth Chabad-Lubavitch Rebbe
- Rabbi Menachem Mendel Schneerson (1902 – 1994), the seventh Chabad-Lubavitch Rebbe

=== Rebbes of Chabad offshoots ===
- Rabbi Yehuda Leib Schneersohn (1811 – 1866), the second son of third Chabad and the founder and first rebbe of the Kopust-Chabad offshoot dynasty
- Rabbi Shlomo Zalman Schneersohn (1830 – 1900), the second rebbe of the Kopust-Chabad dynasty
- Rabbi Shmaryahu Noah Schneersohn (1842 – 1924), the third rebbe of the Kopust-Chabad dynasty
- Rabbi Chaim Schneur Zalman Schneersohn (d. 1879), the son of third Chabad and the founder and first rebbe of the Liadi-Chabad offshoot dynasty
- Rabbi Yitzchak Dovber Schneersohn, the second rebbe of the Liadi-Chabad dynasty

=== Others ===
- Chaya Mushka Schneersohn (d. 1860), the wife of Rabbi Menachem Mendel Schneersohn, the third Chabad rebbe
- Rabbi Levi Yitzchak Schneerson (1878 – 1944), a Kabbalist, rabbi of Dnepropetrovsk and the father of Rabbi Menachem Mendel Schneerson, the seventh Chabad rebbe
- Chana Schneerson (1880 – 1964), the mother of the seventh Chabad rebbe.
- Rabbi Isaac Schneersohn (1879 or 1881(?) – 1969), a French rabbi, industrialist, founder of the first Holocaust Archives and Memorial.
- Antoine Ethan-Lev Baduel Schneersohn Salzman (1971 – ), President and CEO of Radio FG, radio presenter, the first Chabad-Lubavitch Rebbe dynasty
- Jean-Etienne Yaakov-Lev Baduel Schneersohn Salzman (1978 – ), CEO of Radio FG, the first Chabad-Lubavitch Rebbe dynasty
- Rabbi Schneour Zalman Schneersohn (1898 – 1980), a French Hasidic Rabbi.
- Chaya Mushka Schneersohn (1901 – 1988), the wife of Rabbi Menachem Mendel, the seventh Chabad rebbe
- Menucha Rochel Slonim (1798 – 1888), the daughter of Dovber, the second rebbe. Leader and pioneer of the Hebron community in Israel.
- Zelda Schneersohn Mishkovsky (1914 – 1984), an Israeli poet, widely known as Zelda
- Nathan Schneersohn (1881 – 1937), a Russian Menshevik revolutionary and Soviet museum curator
- Chaim Tzvi Schneerson (1834–1882), member of the Old Yishuv
