= Jews as the chosen people =

The concept of Jews as the chosen people is the belief that the Jewish people, via the Mosaic and Abrahamic covenants, are selected to be in a covenant with God. It is a core element of Judaism, Christianity, and in the post-Christian Western world although its meaning has been interpreted in different ways and has varied over time.

Much has been written about these topics in rabbinic literature. In modern times, the three largest Jewish denominations — Orthodox Judaism, Conservative Judaism and Reform Judaism — maintain the belief that Jews have been chosen by God for a purpose. Sometimes this choice is seen by believers as charging the Jewish people with a specific mission—to be a light unto the nations, and to exemplify the covenant with God as described in the Torah.

== Biblical origins ==
In the Hebrew Bible, chosenness or election (Note: The word "chosen" or “elected" in the Bible is the Hebrew word בָּחִיר bachir in the Masoretic text and ἐκλεκτός eklektos in the Septuagint) refers to God's decision to enter a series of covenants – i.e. binding agreements – with Abraham and later a group of his descendants, the Israelites; some descendants were later to be excluded.

The term "chosen people" (Hebrew: הָעָם הַנִבְחַר hāʿām hanīvḥar) is a rabbinic term, not used directly in the Bible. The biblical terms ʿam segullah and ʿam nahallah mean “treasure people” and “heritage people” respectively.

Israelites being properly the chosen people of God is found directly in the Book of Deuteronomy 7:6 as the verb baḥar (בָּחַר), and is alluded to elsewhere in the Hebrew Bible using other terms such as goy kadosh meaning "holy people", Book of Exodus 19:6.

According to the Torah, the nations which inhabited Canaan after Jacob left violated God's laws and were to be vomited out of the land as a result, however their iniquity was not sufficiently great to deserve that result until a few hundred years later, which was when God then brought Jacob's descendants back to the land, with a warning that they too would be cast out if they violated God's rules regarding idolatry and other 'abominations'. In Deuteronomy, the Torah states: "when the Lord delivers the Israelites to the land, the other nations will be cast out, and "thou shalt make no covenant with them, nor show mercy unto them" Deuteronomy 7:5-7:6,

"But thus shall ye deal with them; ye shall destroy their altars, and break down their images, and cut down their groves, and burn their graven images with fire. For thou art a holy people unto the LORD thy God: the LORD thy God hath chosen thee to be His own treasure, out of all peoples that are upon the face of the earth."

A similar passage speaking of Israel as the chosen people follows prohibitions on baldness and cutting yourself in mourning, "For thou art a holy people".

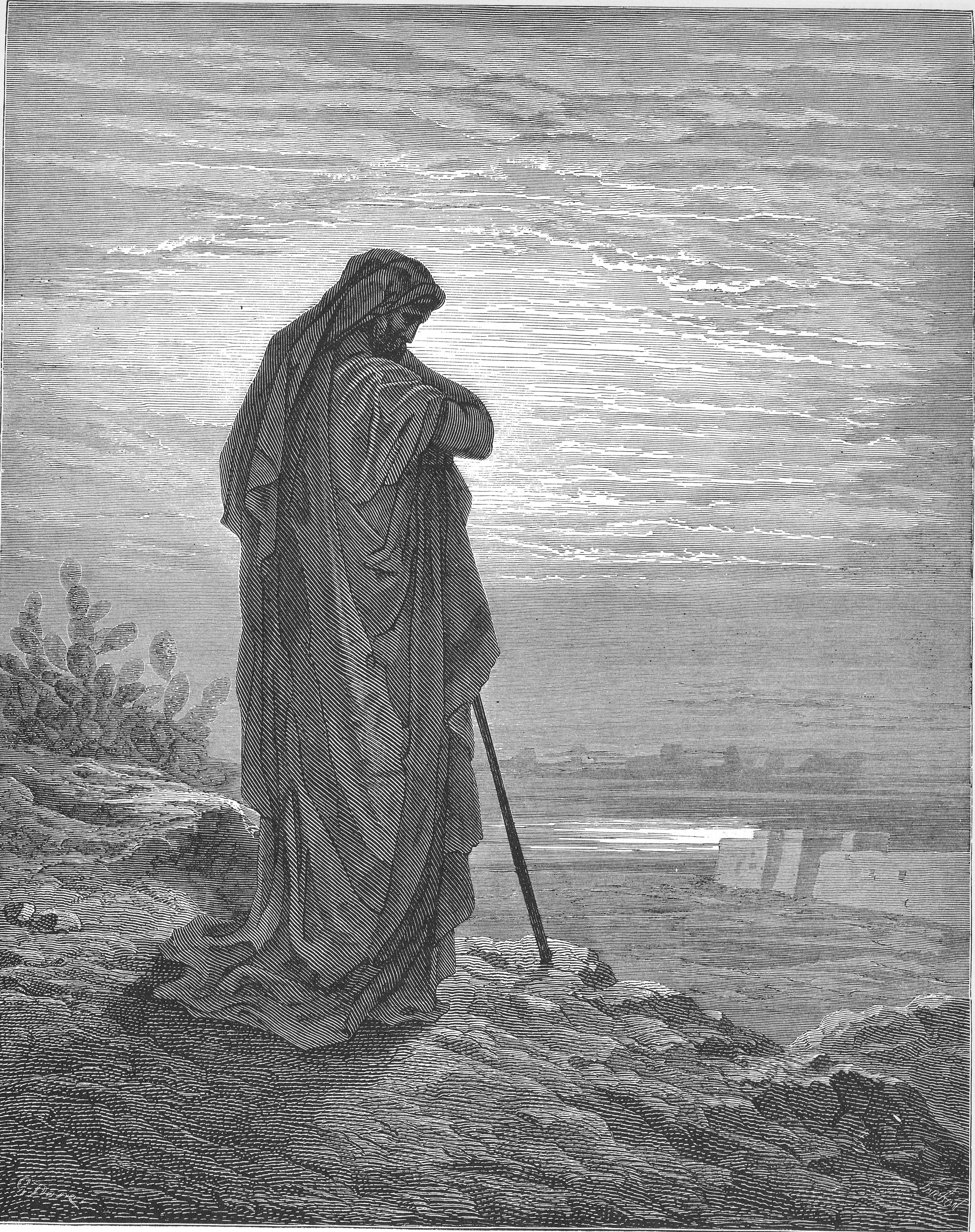
Prophet Amos as depicted by Gustave Doré

The Torah also says,

"Now therefore, if you will obey my voice indeed, and keep my covenant, then you shall be a peculiar treasure unto me from all the peoples, for all the earth is mine."

God promises that he will never exchange his people with any other:

"And I will establish My covenant between Me and you and your descendants after you in their generations, for an everlasting covenant, to be God to you and your descendants after you."

Other Torah verses about chosenness,

- "And you shall be unto me a kingdom of priests, and a holy nation"
- "The Lord did not set his love upon you, nor choose you, because you were more in number than any people; for you were the fewest of all people; but because the Lord loved you, and because he would keep the oath which he had sworn unto your ancestors."

The obligation imposed upon the Israelites was emphasized by the prophet Amos:

"You only have I singled out of all the families of the earth: therefore will I visit upon you all your iniquities."

Isaiah and Jeremiah viewed God's loving choice of Israel as a means to teaching monotheism, combatting idolatry, curbing human arrogance, ending violence, lust, greed, extreme chauvinism and warfare, and ushering in a new society .

== Rabbinic views ==
Most Jewish texts do not state that "God chose the Jews" by itself. Rather, this is usually linked with a mission or purpose, such as proclaiming God's message among all the nations, even though Jews cannot become "unchosen" if they shirk their mission. This implies a special duty, which evolves from the belief that Jews have been pledged by the covenant which God concluded with the biblical patriarch Abraham, their ancestor, and again with the entire Jewish nation at Mount Sinai. In this view, Jews are charged with living a holy life as God's priest-people.

In the Jewish prayerbook (the Siddur), chosenness is referred to in a number of ways. The blessing for reading the Torah reads, "Praised are You, Lord our God, King of the Universe, Who has chosen us out of all the nations and bestowed upon us His Torah." In the "Kiddush", a prayer of sanctification, in which the Sabbath is inaugurated over a cup of wine, the text reads, "For you have chosen us and sanctified us out of all the nations, and have given us the Sabbath as an inheritance in love and favour. Praised are you, Lord, who hallows the Sabbath." In the "Kiddush" recited on festivals it reads, "Blessed are You ... who have chosen us from among all nations, raised us above all tongues, and made us holy through His commandments." The Aleinu prayer refers to the concept of Jews as a chosen people:

"It is our duty to praise the Master of all, to exalt the Creator of the Universe, who has not made us like the nations of the world and has not placed us like the families of the earth; who has not designed our destiny to be like theirs, nor our lot like that of all their multitude. We bend the knee and bow and acknowledge before the Supreme King of Kings, the Holy One, blessed be he, that it is he who stretched forth the heavens and founded the earth. His seat of glory is in the heavens above; his abode of majesty is in the lofty heights.

Sometimes this choice is seen as charging the Jewish people with a specific mission—to be a light unto the nations, and to exemplify the covenant with God as described in the Torah. This view, however, does not always preclude a belief that God has a relationship with other peoples—rather, Judaism held that God had entered into a covenant with all humankind, and that Jews and non-Jews alike have a relationship with God. Biblical references as well as rabbinic literature support this view: Moses refers to the "God of the spirits of all flesh", and the Tanakh also identifies prophets outside the community of Israel. Based on these statements, some rabbis theorized that, in the words of Natan'el al-Fayyumi, a Yemenite Jewish theologian of the 12th century, "God permitted to every people something he forbade to others...[and] God sends a prophet to every people according to their own language." The Mishnah states that "Humanity was produced from one man, Adam, to show God's greatness. When a man mints a coin in a press, each coin is identical. But when the King of Kings, the Holy One, blessed be He, creates people in the form of Adam not one is similar to any other." The Tosefta, a collection of important post-Talmudic discourses, also states: "Righteous people of all nations have a share in the world to come."

Within Judaism, the status as a "chosen people" does not connote ethnic supremacy, nor does it preclude a belief that God has a relationship with other peoples—rather, Judaism holds that God had entered into a covenant with all humankind, and that Jews and non-Jews alike have a relationship with God. Biblical references as well as rabbinic literature support this view: Moses refers to the "God of the spirits of all flesh", the Tanakh (Hebrew Bible) also identifies prophets outside the community of Israel and the prophet Jonah is explicitly told to go prophesize to the non-Jewish people of Nineveh. Jewish tradition is clear that there were interactions of non-Jewish prophets with God which are not recounted in the Torah. Based on these statements and stories, some rabbis theorized that, in the words of Natan'el al-Fayyumi, a Yemenite Jewish theologian of the 12th century, "God permitted to some people that which he forbade to others ... [and] God sends a prophet to every people according to their own language." (Levine, 1907/1966) The Mishnah states that "Humanity was produced from one man, Adam, to show God's greatness. When a man mints a coin in a press, each coin is identical. But when the King of Kings, the Holy One, blessed be He, creates people in the form of Adam not one is similar to any other" (Mishnah Sanhedrin 4:5).

According to the Rabbis, "Israel is of all nations the most willful or headstrong one, and the Torah was to give it the right scope and power of resistance, or else the world could not have withstood its fierceness."

"The Lord offered the Law to all nations; but all refused to accept it except Israel."

How do we understand "A Gentile who consecrates his life to the study and observance of the Law ranks as high as the high priest", says R. Meïr, by deduction from Lev. xviii. 5; II Sam. vii. 19; Isa. xxvi. 2; Ps. xxxiii. 1, cxviii. 20, cxxv. 4, where all stress is laid not on Israel, but on man or the righteous one.

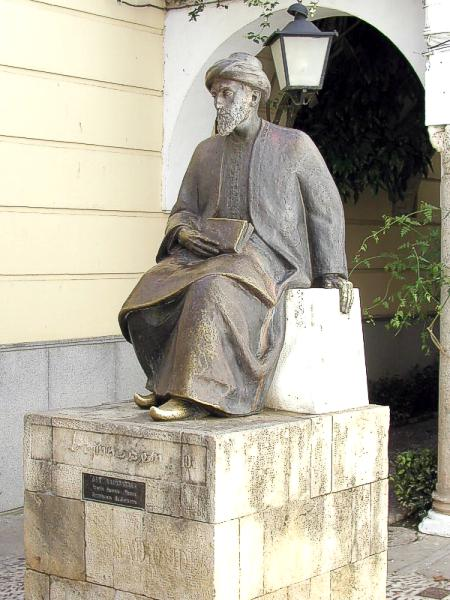
Monument to Maimonides in Córdoba, Spain

Maimonides states: It is now abundantly clear that the pledges Hashem made to Avraham and his descendants would be fulfilled exclusively first in Yitzchak and then in Yaakov, Yitzchak son. This is confirmed by a passage that states, "He is ever mindful of His covenant ... that He made with Avraham, swore to Yitzchak, and confirmed in a decree for Yaakov, for Yisrael, as an eternal covenant."

The Gemara states this regarding a non-Jew who studies Torah [his 7 mitzvot] and regarding this, see Shita Mekubetzes, Bava Kama 38a who says that this is an exaggeration. In any case, this statement was not extolling the non-Jew. The Rishonim explain that it is extolling the Torah.

Tosfos explains that it uses the example of a kohen gadol (high priest), because this statement is based on the verse, "y'kara hi mipnimim" (it is more precious than pearls). This is explained elsewhere in the Gemara to mean that the Torah is more precious pnimim (translated here as "inside" instead of as "pearls"; thus that the Torah is introspectively absorbed into the person), which refers to lifnai v'lifnim (translated as "the most inner of places"), that is the Holy of Holies where the kahon gadol went.

In any case, in Midrash Rabba this statement is made with an important addition: a non-Jew who converts and studies Torah etc.

Nachman of Breslov believed that Jewishness is a level of consciousness, and not an intrinsic inborn quality. He wrote that, according to the Book of Malachi, one can find "potential Jews" among all nations, whose souls are illuminated by the leap of "holy faith", which "activated" the Jewishness in their souls. These people would otherwise convert to Judaism, but prefer not to do so. Instead, they recognize the Divine unity within their pagan religions. Isaac Arama, an influential philosopher and mystic of the 15th century, believed that righteous non-Jews are spiritually identical to the righteous Jews. Rabbi Menachem Meiri, a famous Catalan Talmudic commentator and Maimonidian philosopher, considered all people, who sincerely profess an ethical religion, to be part of a greater "spiritual Israel". He explicitly included Christians and Muslims in this category. Meiri rejected all Talmudic laws that discriminate between Jews and non-Jews, claiming that they only apply to the ancient idolators, who had no sense of morality. The only exceptions are a few laws related directly or indirectly to intermarriage, which Meiri did recognize. Meiri applied his idea of "spiritual Israel" to the Talmudic statements about unique qualities of the Jewish people. For example, he believed that the famous saying that Israel is above astrological predestination (Ein Mazal le-Israel) also applied to the followers of other ethical faiths. He also considered countries, inhabited by decent moral non-Jews, such as Languedoc, as a spiritual part of the Holy Land.

== Modern Jewish views ==
=== Modern Orthodox views ===
Rabbi Lord Immanuel Jakobovits, former Chief Rabbi of the United Synagogue of Great Britain (Modern Orthodox Judaism), stated that he saw chosenness as a universal principle, with every people having a providential role; the specific covenantal mission is to pioneer religion and morality. Modern Orthodox theologian Michael Wyschogrod wrote in 1984 that election of Abraham is God's free choice without stated rationale; chosenness is rooted in God's sovereign will, formalized through Abraham's calling, rather than human merit. Rabbi Norman Lamm, a leader of Modern Orthodox Judaism, links chosenness exclusively to Torah and mitzvot, revealed at Sinai (the Sinaitic covenant). Lamm sees it as both communal holiness and priestly service to humanity.

=== Conservative views ===
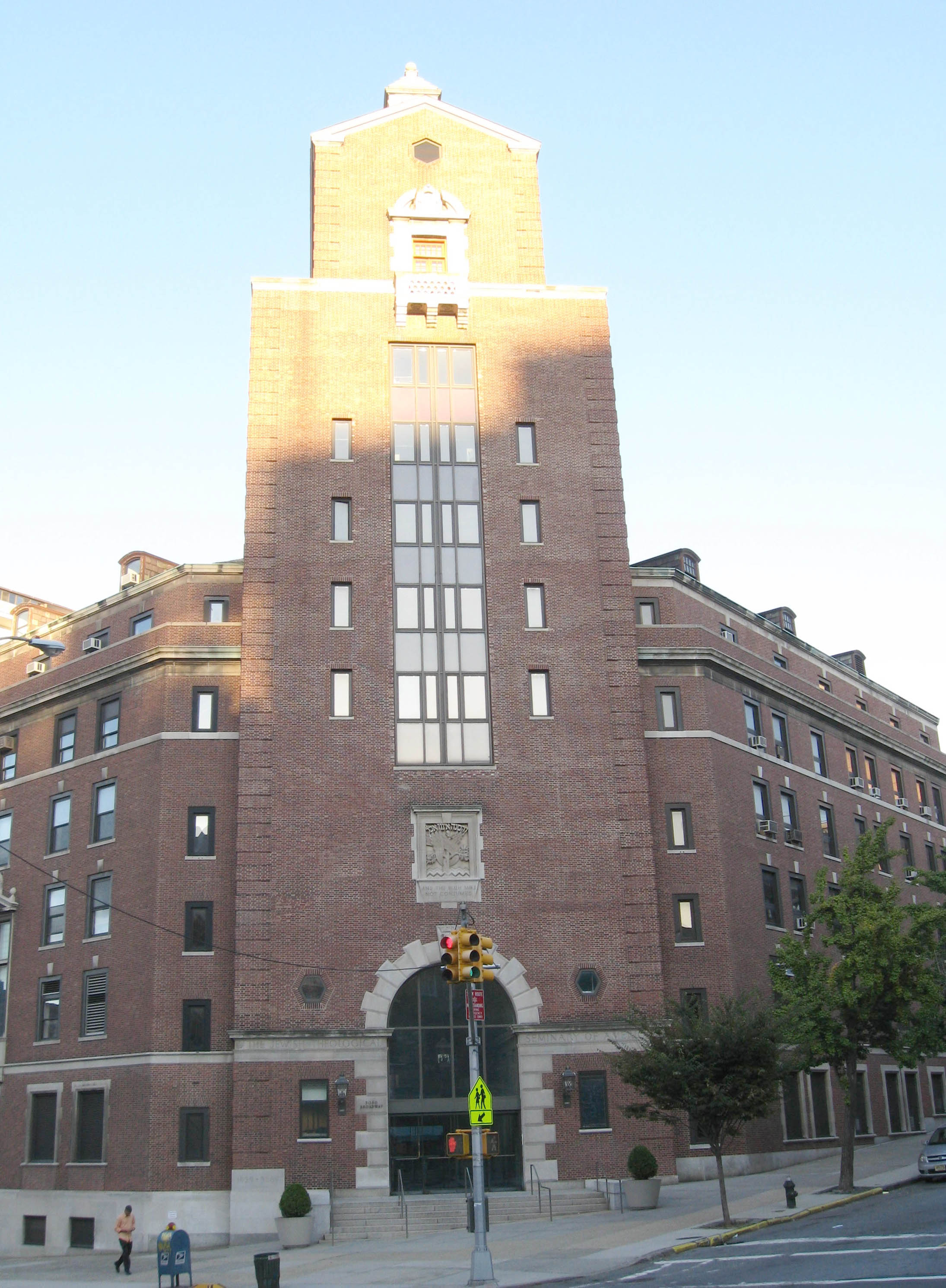
The Jewish Theological Seminary of America, the main rabbinical seminary of Conservative Judaism

Conservative Judaism emphasizes in its 1988 Statement of Principles that chosenness is not innate superiority but a covenantal responsibility. The statement cites Amos 3:2 to show election implies accountability, framing it as a mission to build a just society, especially in the Land of Israel, as a light unto the nations. Rabbi Reuven Hammer commented in 2003 on the excised sentence in the Aleinu prayer mentioned above, clarifying that even historically polemical liturgical phrases were not about ethnic superiority, but about monotheism over paganism; chosenness is about belief and calling, not intrinsic worth.

=== Reform views ===
Reform Judaism views the concept of chosenness as follows: "Throughout the ages it has been Israel's mission to witness to the Divine in the face of every form of paganism and materialism. We regard it as our historic task to cooperate with all men in the establishment of the kingdom of God, of universal brotherhood, Justice, truth and peace on earth. This is our Messianic goal." In 1999 the Reform movement stated, "We affirm that the Jewish people are bound to God by an eternal covenant, as reflected in our varied understandings of Creation, Revelation and Redemption. ... We are Israel, a people aspiring to holiness, singled out through our ancient covenant and our unique history among the nations to be witnesses to God's presence. We are linked by that covenant and that history to all Jews in every age and place."

=== Reconstructionist views ===
Reconstructionist Judaism rejects the concept of chosenness. This rejection of chosenness is made explicit in the movement's siddurim (prayer books). For example, the original blessing recited before reading from the Torah contains the phrase, "asher bahar banu mikol ha’amim"—"Praised are you Lord our God, ruler of the Universe, who has chosen us from among all peoples by giving us the Torah." The Reconstructionist version is rewritten as "asher kervanu la’avodato", "Praised are you Lord our God, ruler of the Universe, who has drawn us to your service by giving us the Torah." In the mid-1980s, the Reconstructionist movement issued its Platform on Reconstructionism. It states that the idea of chosenness is "morally untenable", because anyone who has such beliefs "implies the superiority of the elect community and the rejection of others." Not all Reconstructionists accept this view. The newest siddur of the movement, Kol Haneshamah, includes the traditional blessings as an option, and some modern Reconstructionist writers have opined that the traditional formulation should be embraced. An original prayer book by the Reconstructionist feminist poet Marcia Falk, The Book of Blessings, has been accepted by many Reform and Reconstructionist Jews. Falk rejects all concepts which are related to hierarchy or distinction; she sees any distinction as leading to the acceptance of other kinds of distinctions, thus leading to prejudice. She writes that as a politically liberal feminist, she must reject distinctions made between men and women, homosexuals and heterosexuals, Jews and non-Jews, and to some extent even distinctions between the Sabbath and the other six days of the week. She thus rejects the idea of chosenness as unethical. She also rejects Jewish theology in general, and instead holds to a form of religious humanism. Reconstructionist author Judith Plaskow also criticises the idea of chosenness, for many of the same reasons as Falk. A politically liberal lesbian, Plaskow rejects most distinctions made between men and women, homosexuals and heterosexuals, and Jews and non-Jews. In contrast to Falk, Plaskow does not reject all concepts of difference as inherently leading to unethical beliefs, and holds to a more classical form of Jewish theism than Falk. A number of responses to these views have been made by Reform and Conservative Jews; they hold the view that these criticisms are against teachings that do not exist within liberal forms of Judaism, and such teachings are rare in Orthodox Judaism (outside certain Haredi communities, such as Chabad). A separate criticism stems from the very existence of feminist forms of Judaism in all denominations of Judaism, which do not have a problem with the concept of chosenness.

=== Chabad Hasidism ===
The Tanya contains statements to the effect that the Jewish soul is qualitatively different from the non-Jewish soul. A number of known Chabad rabbis offered alternative readings of the Tanya, did not take this teaching literally, and even managed to reconcile it with the leftist ideas of internationalism and class struggle. The original text of the Tanya refers to the "idol worshippers" and does not mention the "nations of the world" at all, although such interpretation was endorsed by Menachem Mendel Schneerson and is popular in contemporary Chabad circles. Hillel Paricher, an early Tanya commentator, wrote that the souls of righteous Gentiles are more similar to the Jewish souls, and are generally good and not egoistic. This teaching was accepted by Schneerson and is considered normative in Chabad. According to the author of the Tanya himself, a righteous non-Jew can achieve a high level of spirituality, similar to an angel, although his soul is still fundamentally different in character, but not value, from a Jewish one. Tzemach Tzedek, the third rebbe of Chabad, wrote that the Muslims are naturally good-hearted people. Rabbi Yosef Jacobson, a popular contemporary Chabad lecturer, teaches that in today's world most non-Jews belong to the category of righteous Gentiles, effectively rendering the Tanya's attitude anachronistic. An anti-Zionist interpretation of Tanya was offered by Abraham Yehudah Khein, a prominent Ukrainian Chabad rabbi, who supported anarchist communism and considered Peter Kropotkin a great Tzaddik. Khein basically read the Tanya backwards; since the souls of idol worshipers are known to be evil, according to the Tanya, while the Jewish souls are known to be good, he concluded that truly altruistic people are really Jewish, in a spiritual sense, while Jewish nationalists and class oppressors are not. By this logic, he claimed that Vladimir Solovyov and Rabindranath Tagore probably have Jewish souls, while Leon Trotsky and other totalitarians do not, and many Zionists, whom he compared to apes, are merely "Jewish by birth certificate".

=== Philosophical views ===
Jewish chosenness has often been associated with the this-worldly goal of redemption, blurring the distinction between religious and secular understandings of Jewish identity. Jewish distinctiveness has also been linked to a range of nonreligious qualities such as rationalism and idealism.

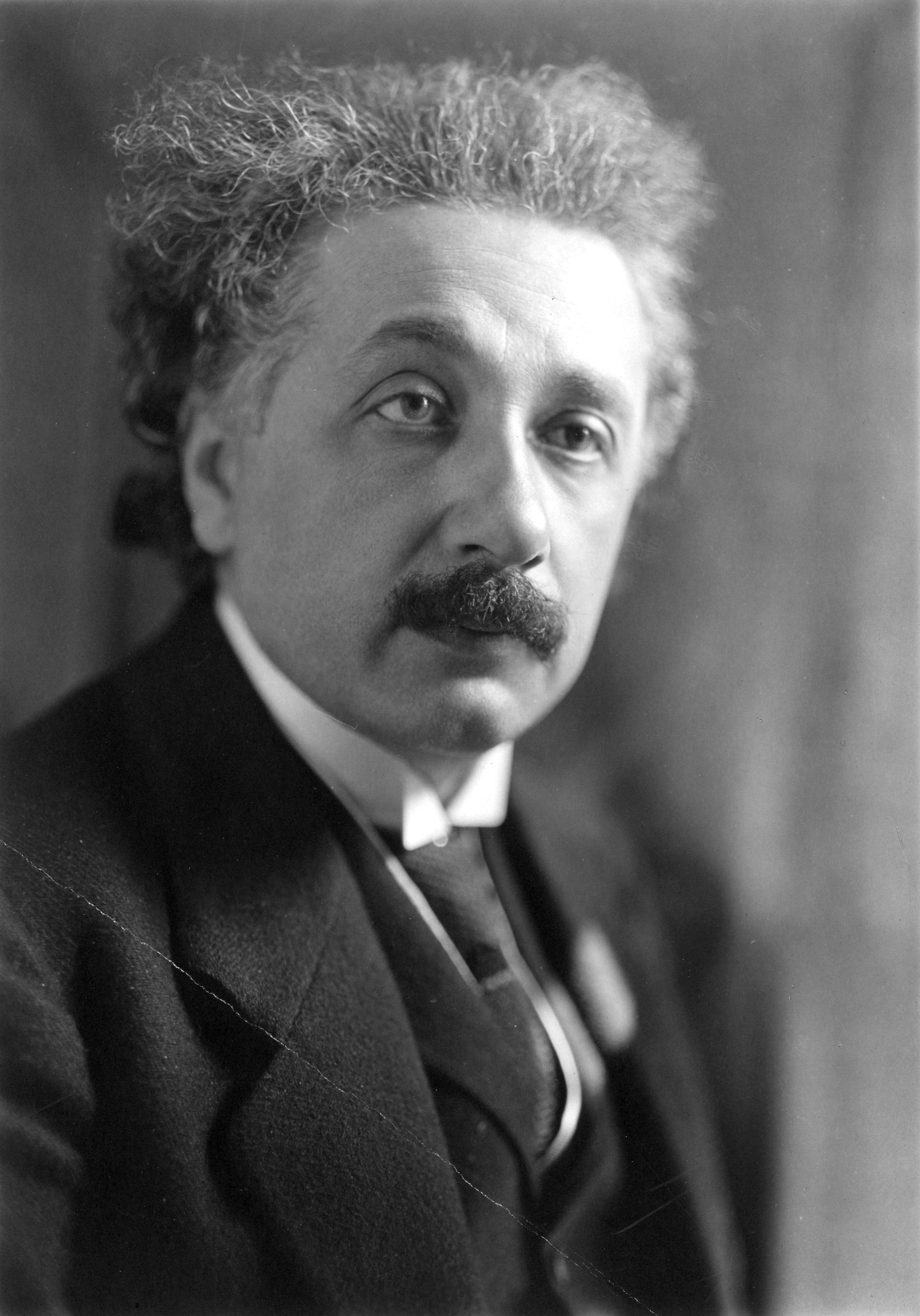
Einstein in 1921, by Harris & Ewing studio

One Jewish critic of chosenness was the philosopher Baruch Spinoza. In the third chapter of his Theologico-Political Treatise, Spinoza mounts an argument against a naive interpretation of God's choice of the Jewish people. Bringing evidence from the Bible itself, he argues that God's choice of Israel was not unique (he had chosen other nations before choosing the Hebrew nation) and that the choice of the Jewish people is neither inclusive (it does not include all Jews, but only the 'pious' ones) nor exclusive (it also includes 'true gentile prophets'). Finally, he argues that God's choice is not unconditional. Recalling the numerous times God threatened the complete destruction of the Hebrew nation, he asserts that this choice is neither absolute, nor eternal, nor necessary.

In a German-language letter to philosopher Eric Gutkind, dated 3 January 1954, the physicist Albert Einstein explained that while he valued his Jewish identity culturally, he rejected religious belief, the divine origin of the Bible, and the idea that Jews are “chosen”.

In a 1973 conversation at the Center for the Study of Democratic Institutions, historian Gershom Scholem challenged the expectation that Jews must justify their existence through exceptional service to humanity. He asserted that Jews have the same right as other peoples to exist as themselves without demonstrating a greater purpose. At the same time, he noted that the concept of Jewish chosenness remains difficult to discard.

The Israeli philosopher Ze'ev Levy writes that chosenness can be "(partially) justified only from the historical angle" with respect to its spiritual and moral contribution to Jewish life through the centuries as "a powerful agent of consolation and hope". He points out, however, that modern anthropological theories "do not merely proclaim the inherent universal equality of all people [as] human beings; they also stress the equivalence [emphasis in original] of all human cultures." He continues that "there are no inferior and superior people or cultures but only different, other, ones." He concludes that the concept of chosenness entails ethnocentrism, "which does not go hand in hand with otherness, that is, with unconditional respect of otherness".

== Views of other religions ==
=== Islam ===
The children of Israel enjoy a special status in the Islamic holy book, the Quran (2:47 and 2:122). However, Muslim scholars point out that this status did not confer upon Israelites any racial superiority, and was only valid so long as the Israelites maintain their covenant with God.

=== Christianity ===
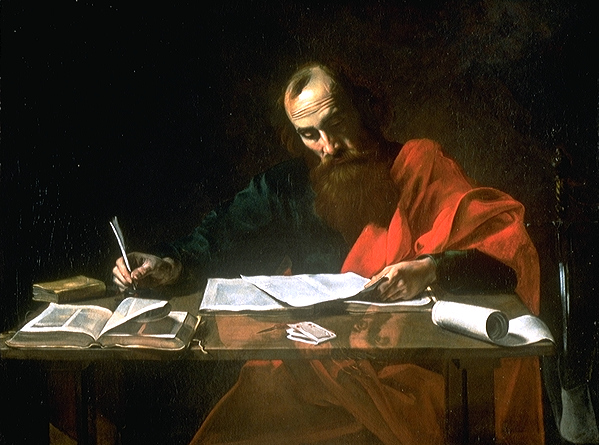
Artist's depiction of Saint Paul Writing His Epistles, 16th century (Blaffer Foundation Collection, Houston, Texas). Paul was the first major figure in Christian history to hold the view that Jewish law is no longer valid.

Some Christians believe that the Jews were God's chosen people, but because of Jewish rejection of Jesus, the Christians in turn received that special status. This doctrine is known as Supersessionism.

Jewish chosenness was not a matter of inter-religious debate until after the Enlightenment, when ideas of religious toleration and Jewish emancipation confused long-standing categories between Jews and Christians.

Avi Beker, an Israeli scholar and former Secretary General of the World Jewish Congress, regarded the idea of the chosen people as Judaism's defining concept and "the central unspoken psychological, historical, and theological problem which is at the heart of Jewish-Gentile relations." In his book The Chosen: The History of an Idea, and the Anatomy of an Obsession, Beker expresses the view that the concept of chosenness is the driving force behind Jewish-Gentile relations, explaining both the admiration and, more pointedly, the envy and the hatred which the world has felt towards Jews in both religious and secular terms. Beker argues that while Christianity has modified its doctrine on the displacement of the Jewish people, Islam has neither reversed nor reformed its theology concerning the succession of both the Jews and the Christians. According to Beker, this presents a major barrier to conflict resolution in the Arab-Israeli conflict.

Other Christians, such as the Christadelphians, believe that God has not rejected Israel as his chosen people and that all Jews will in fact accept Jesus as their Messiah at his Second Coming, resulting in their salvation. The view that Jews still retain their status as the chosen people is also associated with Dispensational theology, promoted by John Nelson Darby and Cyrus Scofield.

Augustine criticized Jewish chosenness as "carnal." He reasoned that Israel was chosen "according to the flesh."

The Jamieson-Fausset-Brown Bible Commentary similarly argues that God made Israel the "holy nation" to exclusively uphold the promises made to their "pious forefathers". They argue that Jewish views are unsound, with Jews being frequently described as a small people that engaged in "perverse" moral conduct in the Bible.

The Catechism of the Catholic Church describes the "People of God" as referring to all people who have faith in Christ and are baptized. They have characteristics "that distinguish it from all other religious, ethnic, political, or cultural groups found in history".

== Zionism and chosenness ==
Zionism, while emerging as a largely secular nationalist movement, incorporated diverse interpretations of Jewish chosenness, ranging from political pragmatism to religious messianism, reframing the idea as a justification for both Jewish self-determination and global moral leadership. Classical Zionists often downplayed theological exclusivity but retained a sense of Jewish uniqueness and superiority, using chosenness as a motivating force for national liberation and the establishment of a homeland in Palestine. For religious Zionists, however, chosenness remained rooted in divine decree, making Jewish control over the biblical land of Canaan non-negotiable and part of a divinely guided process of redemption. In this view, shared by Christian Zionists as well as Jewish religious Zionists, the land promised in his covenant with Abraham belongs solely to the Jewish people, with Palestinians excluded as non-chosen “Ishmaelites”.

== See also ==
- Anti-Judaism
- Antisemitism
- Criticism of Judaism
- Religious nationalism

== Bibliography ==
- Frank, Daniel H. (1993). "Introduction". In Daniel H. Frank (ed.). A People Apart: Chosenness and Ritual in Jewish Philosophical Thought. State University of New York Press. ISBN 978-0-7914-1632-7. JSTOR jj.18254037.3.
- Levy, Ze’ev [in German] (1993). "Judaism and Chosenness: On Some Controversial Aspects from Spinoza to Contemporary Jewish Thought". In Daniel H. Frank (ed.). A People Apart: Chosenness and Ritual in Jewish Philosophical Thought. State University of New York Press. ISBN 978-0-7914-1632-7. JSTOR jj.18254037.6.
- Novak, David (1995). The Election of Israel. Cambridge: Cambridge University Press. ISBN 978-0-521-04482-0.
- Gürkan, Salime Leyla [in Turkish] (2008-12-05). The Jews as a Chosen People: Tradition and transformation. Routledge. ISBN 978-1-134-03707-0.
- Coogan, Michael (2019-04-02). God's Favorites: Judaism, Christianity, and the Myth of Divine Chosenness. Boston: Beacon Press. ISBN 978-0-8070-0194-3.
- Sutcliffe, Adam (2020). What Are Jews For?: History, Peoplehood, and Purpose. Princeton: Princeton UP. ISBN 978-0-691-27127-9.
