= Chaya Mushka Schneersohn =

Daughter of Rabbi Dovber Schneuri

- Died: December 9, 1860 O.S. (Tevet 8, 5621; December 21, 1860 N.S.); Lyubavichi
- Spouse(s): Rabbi Menachem Mendel Schneersohn, the third Chabad Rebbe, married in 1803 (5563)
- Children: Baruch Shalom; Yehudah Leib of Kopys; Chaim Shneur Zalman of Liadi; Yisroel Noach of Nizhyn; Yosef Yitzchak of Ovruch; Yaacov; Shmuel Schneersohn of Lubavitch; Rada Freida; Devorah Leah
- Father: Rabbi Dovber Schneuri

Chaya Mushka Schneersohn was the daughter of Rabbi Dovber Schneuri, the second Rebbe of the Chabad Hasidic movement, and the wife of Rabbi Menachem Mendel Schneersohn the third Rebbe.

Chaya Mushka Schneerson died on December 9, 1860, O.S. (Tevet 8, 5621; December 21, 1860, N.S.), and was buried in the town of Lubavitch near her grandmother Rebbetzin Sterna and her mother Rebbetzin Sheina.

== History ==
Chaya Mushka Schneersohn married the third Rebbe of Chabad, Rabbi Menachem Mendel Schneersohn. She is known in the Chabad community as "Rebbetzin Chaya Mushka." Rebbetzin Chaya Mushka was an advocate for Agunot, women who are bound to their marriages by Jewish law whether through the husband's disappearance or refusal to comply with divorce proceedings.

Chaya Mushka held the personal custom of reciting the Slichot prayers during the week between Rosh Hashana, the Jewish New Year, and Yom Kippur, the Day of Atonement.
