= Abraham Yehudah Khein =

Ukrainian rabbi and pacifist anarchist

Rabbi Abraham Yehudah Khein
- Авраам Єгуда Хейн
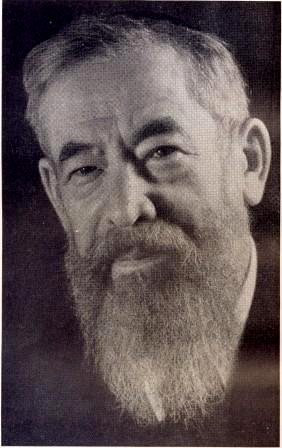

Personal life
- Born: 1878 Chernigov, Chernigov Governorate, Russian Empire
- Died: 5 October 1957 (aged 78–79) Jerusalem, Jerusalem District, Israel
- Buried: Sanhedria Cemetery
- Spouse: Leah Mintzberg
- Children: 3
- Parent: David Tzvi Khein (father)
- Dynasty: Chabad

Religious life
- Religion: Judaism
- Denomination: Kopust

Jewish leader
- Dynasty: Chabad

Abraham Yehudah Khein (Ukrainian: Авраам Єгуда Хейн, Hebrew: אברהם יהודה חין; 1878 in Chernigov – 5 October 1957) was a Chabad-Hasidic Rabbi in the Ukrainian town Nizhyn. Rabbi Khein was a pacifist anarchist. During Rabbi Menachem Mendel Schneerson's reside in Paris, Khein served as Rabbi of the synagogue where Schneerson prayed, as well as catering for Schneerson's hospitality needs. Khein was instrumental in Schneerson's ascent to becoming Rebbe, and the two maintained a relationship for the remainder of Khein's life.

Khein was a non-Zionist, committed to pacifism and nonviolence particularly during the Jewish insurgency in Mandatory Palestine. He tried to relate his readings of Leo Tolstoy and Pyotr Kropotkin to Kabbalah and Hasidism. Rabbi Khein deeply respected Kropotkin, whom he called "the Tzadik of the new world", whose "soul is as pure as crystal" Interpreting various passages from the Talmud, Khein posited that there was never a moment when killing was justified, no matter how guilty the party, and used this theory to advise on the Jewish-Arab conflict at the time, writing to leaders such as the militaristic Ze'ev Jabotinsky.

Rabbi Khein's most known work is his three-volume collection of essays, במלכות היהדות (transl. In the Kingdom of Judaism).

== Biography ==
=== Russia ===
Khein was born in, what was then, Chernigov to Rabbi David Tzvi Khein (1846–1926). Rabbi David Tzvi was incredibly close to Rabbi Shalom DovBer Schneersohn, the Rebbe Rashab, and he and his family would travel on foot to the town of Lyubavitchi to visit the Rebbe.

Khein studied under Rabbi Shlomo HaKohen Aronson [he], was ordained by Rabbi Mordechai Dov Twerski, and studied Jewish law with Rabbi Aryeh Leib Haft.

In 1902, he married Leah Mintzberg, and they would go on to have three children: Dov, Devorah and Shoshana.

In 1914, after a visit to Babruysk for the wedding of his brother, Khein met with Rabbi Shmaryahu Noah Schneersohn, and subsequently switched his allegiance from the Lubavitch branch of Chabad to the Kopust branch, however, Khein would maintain a strong relationship with the Lubavitcher Rebbes.

=== Poland and France ===
In 1933, due to mounting pressure from the Soviet Union on religious authorities, Khein fled to Danzig, and then to Paris.

During Rabbi Menachem Mendel Schneerson's stay in Paris, Schneerson attended Khein's synagogue, and when Rabbi Yosef Yitzhak Schneerson, the Rebbe Rayatz, briefly visited Paris, the Rebbe Rayatz stayed in Khein's home and was hosted by him.

During this period, Khein wrote his book For My Comfort, reflecting on the death of his father, where he discussed the notion of death and mourning in Judaism as well as detailing his family history and lineage. The book had a profound effect on the head of Agudat Yisrael, Rabbi Yitzhak-Meir Levin, who wrote:

"The book For My Comfort has a constant nature to it. I read it a second and a third time and I say to the holy author that I would like something to happen to this book, especially in my mood right now... many things within it sat well with my inner self, with my soul and spirit. It's a shame that the holy author is now taking the book from me. If there is somewhere where can I get a book like this, please let me know."

=== Israel ===
In 1935, Khein immigrated to Tel Aviv, before moving to Jerusalem in 1937. Khein became rabbi at the 'Beit HaMidrash Rambam' and later the head of the Center for Religious Culture near the National Committee. After 1948, he became the head of the Department of Torah Culture in the Ministry of Education and Culture in the State of Israel until his retirement in 1954. He was also rabbi of the Beit Hakerem neighborhood in Jerusalem.

During his time in Israel, Khein became incredibly close with the Chief Rabbi of Israel, Rabbi Yitzhak HaLevi Herzog, who referred to him "my good friend, the total genius." Future President of Israel, Zalman Shazar also attended his lectures.

Khein died in Jerusalem on Yom Kippur of 1957 and is buried in Sanhedria Cemetery.

== Teachings ==
On Sanctified Murder

Khein contrasts three approaches to the sanctification of murder: the Western approach, which allows murder when it benefits the public good, the anarcho-individualist approach, which places one's own life first in face of danger, and the Jewish approach, which never permits willing murder. Khein saw denial of this principle of Judaism as a denial of the foundations of the Torah.

On Economic Inequality

Khein saw economic inequality as a form of violence. He wrote:

"Class division is inconceivable. Neither distinctions of quantity nor of quality are acceptable. The final ideal of such an outlook necessarily requires absolute equality for everyone in everything"

Khein claimed to base this view off of the writings of Schneur Zalman of Liadi, the Alter Rebbe.

On Government

Khein saw government as inherently immoral, necessarily requiring human blood to sustain the economy and military. Khein believed Judaism to be a tool that can be used in challenging governmental authority and to create an equal playing field for all humanity to operate within.

On Zionism

Khein advocated against the mainstream Zionism due to its militaristic tendencies. However, Khein did believe Judaism required "her own portion in the world, her own private domain, her own borders," on condition that it was governed by the "strictest justice." Essentially, if it were to forgo its militarism, Khein was ready to accept even statist Zionism.

== Relationship with the Lubavitcher Rebbe ==
Khein first got to know Rabbi Menachem Mendel Schneerson in Paris in 1933, where Khein was the rabbi of a large congregation and Schneerson was studying to become an engineer. During this time, Schneerson attended Khein's synagogue. In 1950, 30 days after the death of the Rebbe Rayatz, Khein composed the first letter of supplication on behalf of the Chabad Hasidim in Israel asking that Schneerson should assume the leadership and become the new Rebbe.

Later, Khein would go on to send Schneerson unpublished manuscripts amid heartfelt requests for blessings, and Schneerson would similarly respond with Torah thoughts and questions for Khein, particularly as they related to Chabad history.

Schneerson expressed interest in Khein's book, 'For My Comfort.'

When Khein died, Schneerson sent condolences to his daughter, Shoshana.

== Books ==
- In the Kingdom of Judaism - Articulating a Jewish Anarcho-Pacifist mode of thought, rooted in Chabad sources
- For My Comfort - Reflections on death, mourning and the Khein family history
- Judaism and Blood - A defense of Menahem Mendel Beilis

Unpublished works:

- The Troubles of Israel - A treatise on the death penalty in Jewish thought
- Questions Which I Asked the Kohen Gadol - A record of childhood conversations with Rabbi Shlomo HaKohen Aronson

== See also ==
- Anarchism in Israel
- List of peace activists
