= Schneer =

Schneer is a surname. Notable people with the surname include:

- Charles H. Schneer (1920–2009), American film producer
- Jonathan Schneer (born 1948), American historian

== See also ==
- Schneier
- Schneersohn
