= Shneur Zalman Fradkin =

Shneur Zalman Fradkin of Lublin (Yiddish: שנער זאלמן פראַדקין; 1830–1902), also known as the Toras Chessed (after his main work; תורת חסד "Kindly teaching") or The Liader (after his place of birth), was a famous Chabad posek and gaon. He was a disciple of the third Chabad-Lubavitch Rebbe, Rabbi Menachem Mendel Schneersohn (also known as the Tzemach Tzedek).

== Early life ==
Fradkin was born in Liadi, Vitebsk Region, Russian Empire (today Belarus), the city of the founder of the Chabad movement, Rabbi Shneur Zalman of Liadi, after whom Rabbi Fradkin was named.

The sixth Chabad Rebbe, Yosef Yitzchok Schneersohn, recalled that the local book dealer in Lubavitch would not let Fradkin see the books before purchasing them, because after flipping through the pages he had already memorized the whole book.

After marrying, Fradkin traveled to study from Rabbi Eliyahu Yosef of Dribin, where he became a great scholar. He resolved not to be sustained from the position of rabbi, but after losing all his possessions, Rabbi Menachem Mendel Schneersohn instructed him to apply for the position of rabbi in Polotzk, Poland, to which Fradkin was later appointed in 1855.

== Rabbi Fradkin and the Rebbes of Chabad ==
Rabbi Menachem Mendel Schneersohn gave Fradkin an honored position among his followers, calling him a gaon, and having him take part in matters of the Beth din. He said that Rabbi Fradkin was so knowledgeable that he knew how many times the letter vav appears in the Talmud.

The fifth Rebbe of Lubavitch, Rabbi Sholom Dovber Schneersohn, also held Fradkin in high esteem, and said of him, "even in the earlier generations he would have been considered a gaon!"

== In Lublin ==
After staying in Polotzk for thirteen years, in November 1867 Fradkin was appointed as rabbi of Lublin. This was a great honor, for only very few were allowed to be appointed as rabbis there.

== Toras Chessed ==
Fradkin was a great posek, as can be seen from the testimony of Rabbi Menachem Mendel Schneersohn: "I am busy and unable to respond ... pose the question to Rabbi Zalman of Polotzk (i.e., Rabbi Fradkin); you can rely on him." Fradkin gathered the thousands of his responsa into his monumental work, Toras Chessed, published in two volumes (Warsaw, 1883, Jerusalem, 1909).

== Demise ==
In the month of Adar, 5662, he declared to the astonishment of his students: "I can no longer tolerate this world of falsehood!" He died soon after, on 5 Nissan 5662 (1902), and is buried in the Chabad section of the Mount of Olives.
