= Torat Shmuel =

Hasidic book series

Torat Shmuel (or Likutei Torah–Torat Shmuel) (Hebrew: תורת שמאול) is a collection of Hasidic discourses authored by Rabbi Shmuel Schneersohn of Lubavitch (1834-1882), the fourth rebbe of Chabad. The collection is thought to be the first text in Chabad philosophy to have made use of serialization of discourses, referred in Chabad as a hemshech (Heb.: המשך).

== Publication history ==
The Hasidic writings of Shmuel Schneersohn were subject to a delayed publication history. An early work published shortly after Shmuel Schneersohn's death was Likutei Torah L’gimmel Parashios (Vilna, 1884), but was limited to notes to earlier Hasidic discourses instead of his original writings. The first volume of Torat Shmuel was published by Kehot Publication Society in 1945 but was limited to select copies of handwritten discourses. In 1978, Rabbi Menachem Mendel Schneerson, the seventh Chabad rebbe, established an institute to oversee the publication of Chabad discourses, a move that resulted in the renewed typeset publication of Torat Shmuel. The present collection published by Kehot contains twenty-seven volumes. An English edition of an 1879 discourse was published by Kehot in 2009 as part of their Chasidic Heritage Series under the title of Feminine Faith.
