= Schneier =

Schneier is a surname. Notable people with the surname include:

- Arthur Schneier (born 1930), Austrian-American rabbi and human rights activist
- Bruce Schneier (born 1963), American cryptographer, computer security specialist, and writer
- Marc Schneier (born 1959), American rabbi

== See also ==
- Schneer
