= Kopust =

Branch of the Chabad movement

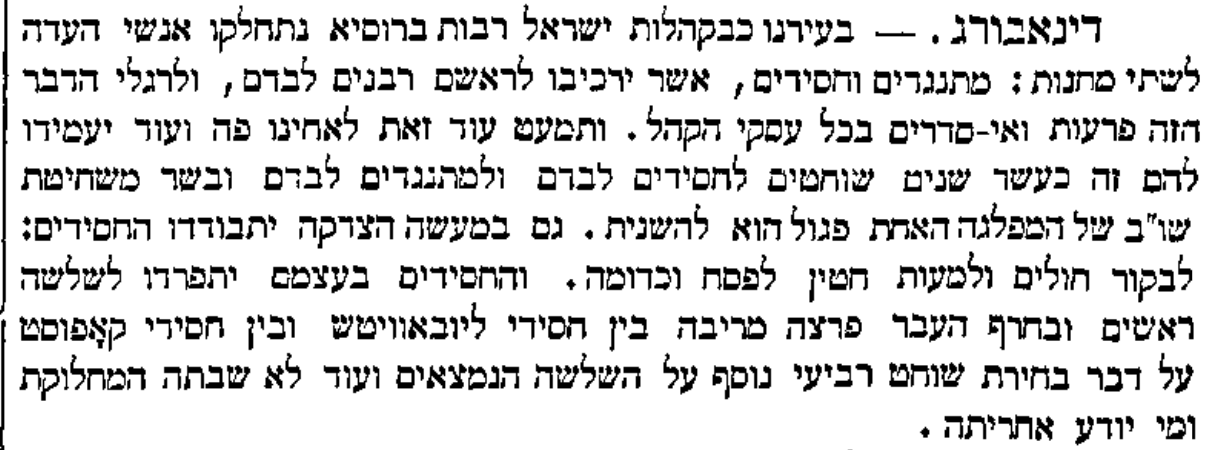
Chasidim of Kapust (Chabad) in HaMelitz. 25 May 1880. P9.

The Kopust branch of the Chabad dynasty of Hasidic Judaism was founded in 1866 by Yehuda Leib Schneersohn after the death of his father Menachem Mendel Schneersohn, the third Chabad rebbe. It is named after the town of Kopys in the Vitebsk Region of present-day Belarus, where Yehuda Leib Schneersohn settled after his father's death.

== History ==
Kopust is an offshoot of the Chabad-Lubavitch movement which produced multiple offshoot groups through its over 200-year history. The death of the third Chabad rebbe Menachem Mendel Schneersohn led to a dispute over his succession leading to the founding of Kopust.

=== Founding ===
Following Schneersohn's death in 1866 a dispute arose among several of his seven sons over the succession. While the youngest son, Shmuel Schneersohn assumed the title of rebbe in the town of Lubavitch, another son, Yehuda Leib Schneersohn, assumed the title in the town of Kopys, but died less than a year later and was succeeded by his son Shlomo Zalman Schneersohn.

=== Leadership ===
The Kopust dynasty had four rebbes:

- Yehuda Leib Schneersohn (1808–1866), known as the Maharil (Note: a Hebrew acronym for "Moreinu HaRav Yehuda Leib") of Kopust. He founded the movement after the death of his father, Menachem Mendel Scheersohn.
- Shlomo Zalman Schneersohn (1830–1900), oldest son of Yehuda Leib, assumed his father's position in Kopust. He is the author of a work on Hasidism titled "Magen Avot" ("Shield of the Fathers").
- Shalom Dovber Schneersohn (1834–1908), known as the Rashab of Rechitsa. (Note: a Hebrew acronym for "Rav Shalom Ber") Succeeding his brother, Shlomo Zalman, Shalom Dovber served as the Kopuster movement's rebbe in the town of Rechitsa.
- Shmaryahu Noah Schneersohn (1842–1924), known as Shmaryahu Noah of Babruysk. Succeeding his brother, Shlomo Zalman, Shmaryahu Noah served as the Kopuster movement's rebbe in the town of Babruysk. He was rabbi of the chasidim in Babruysk from 1872, and founded a yeshiva there in 1901. He authored a two volume work on Hasidism, titled "Shemen LaMaor" ("Light for the Luminary").

=== Kopust today ===
After the death of the fourth rebbe of Kopust, the adherents of the Kopuster movement rejoined the Chabad-Lubavitch movement.

The oldest extant Chabad synagogue in Israel, the Ohel Yitzchok (אהל יצחק) synagogue in the Mea Shearim neighborhood of Jerusalem—also called the Baal HaTanya Shul (Yiddish: בעל התניא שול: "Baal HaTanya's synagogue")—active since 1900, was originally affiliated with Kopust.

== Relationship with Chabad-Lubavitch ==
While the Kopust movement originally was at odds with the Chabad-Lubavitch movement over the successor to the third Chabad rebbe, the sixth Lubavitcher rebbe, Yosef Yitzchak Schneersohn referred to the Rebbes of Kopust as "Admorim", (Note: Hebrew acronym for Adoneinu Moreinu v'Rabeinu, a term for a Chassidic rebbe or Grand Rabbi) or rebbes.

== Works ==
- Magen Avos of Shlomo Zalman Schneerson
- Shemen La'Maor of Shmaryahu Noah Schneersohn vol. 1 vol. 2
