= Nathan Schneersohn =

- Натан Шнеерсон
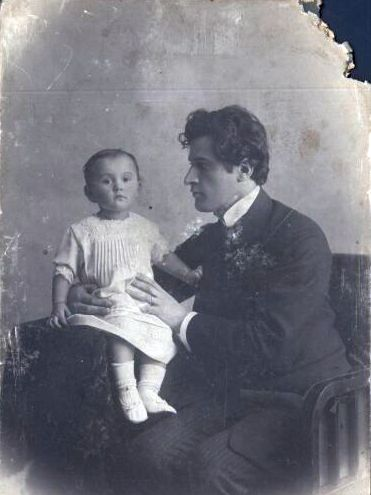
- Anatoly Schneerson with his daughter Alexandra, 1912
- Born: Анатолий Абрамович Шнеерсон; 18 March 1881; Yekaterinoslav, Russian Empire
- Died: 9 October 1937 (aged 56); Moscow, RSFSR, USSR
- Political party: Russian Social Democratic Labour Party, Mensheviks
- Movement: Socialism, Marxism

Nathan Aleksandrovich (Anatoly Abramovich) Schneersohn (also known under the alias Yeryoma, 18 March [O.S. 6 March] 1881, Yekaterinoslav, Yekaterinoslav Governorate, Russian Empire – 9 October 1937, Moscow, RSFSR, USSR) – a Russian Menshevik revolutionary and Soviet museum curator, the founder and first director (1920–1937) of the New Jerusalem State Museum of History and Art, located near Moscow in the monastery of the same name. He was also the addressee of the text by Vladimir Lenin published as a separate brochure in Geneva in 1904 under the title "Letter to a Comrade on Our Organizational Tasks".

== Biography ==
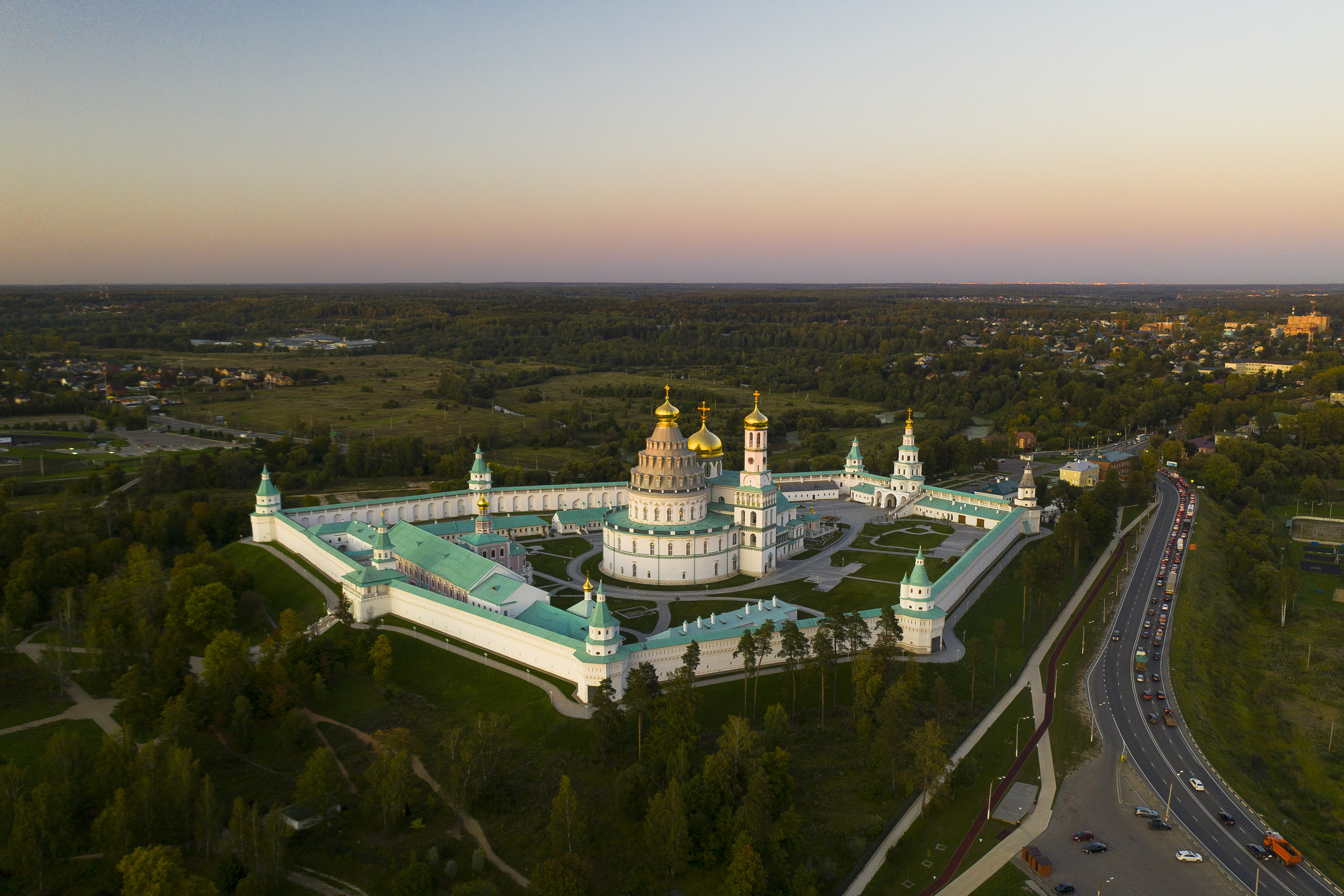
New Jerusalem Monastery

Anatoly Schneersohn was born on March 6 (18), 1881, in Yekaterinoslav to a wealthy Jewish family of the Saint Petersburg merchant Abram Schneersohn. Abram Schneersohn was a merchant of the first guild. The merchants of the first guild were not subject to restrictions related to the obligation to live within the Pale of Settlement. Anatoly Schneersohn was the great-grandson of Menachem Mendel Schneersohn (also known as Tzemach Tzedek), the third Lubavitcher Rebbe, and a descendant of Shneur Zalman of Liadi (Alter Rebbe) in the fifth generation.

Anatoly Schneerson showed interest in social democracy relatively early, which led to a conflict with his father. Already in 1902, he was a member of the RSDLP (Russian Social Democratic Labor Party, which later split into the Bolsheviks and Mensheviks) and was involved in correspondence with Lenin. He was briefly arrested in Kyiv, after which he left for Geneva. Schneersohn participated in RSDLP congresses, including the 5th (London) congress, at which he criticized Lenin's views. At the same congress, he was presumably elected as a candidate for membership in the Central Committee of the RSDLP. He inherited significant funds from his father and returned to Russia. After that, he formally left the Menshevik Party, but in fact became one of the key sponsors of the Menshevik Party.

During the revolution, for an unknown reason, he began using the passport of a deceased relative, changing his name from Anatoly Abramovich to Nathan Aleksandrovich Schneerson. Under this name, in 1920 he arrived in the city of Voskresensk (now known as the city of Istra in Moscow Oblast). In Voskresensk, Schneersohn became interested in the New Jerusalem, a majestic monastery erected in the 17th century by order of the head of the Russian Orthodox Church, Patriarch Nikon. Patriarch Nikon wanted to reproduce the main sites of Jerusalem near Moscow, so the main temple of the monastery was a replica of the Church of the Holy Sepulchre in Jerusalem. The monastery was adjoined by the "Garden of Gethsemane". The other elements and buildings also had symbolic meaning. The Orthodox monastery in New Jerusalem served its initial function until the revolution. The monastery was abandoned by the monks under revolutionaries’ pressure and fell into disrepair.

Schneersohn came up with the idea of using the empty buildings and creating a local history museum in them. This initiative received support from the local Soviet authorities. The New Jerusalem monastery complex near Moscow effectively received a second life. Nathan Schneersohn became the first director of the new museum.

In 1930, at the First Russian Museum Congress, Schneersohn presented an extensive report on the new ideological and practical principles of organization in Soviet regional museums.

By 1936, New Jerusalem had existed as a museum for over 15 years and had the status of a state regional museum, serving as the main museum center for the Moscow oblast.

However, on May 28, 1937, in the course of the Great Terror, Schneersohn was arrested on the absurd charge of "terrorist activity", along with many other representatives of the scientific intelligentsia. On October 9, 1937, the Military Collegium of the Supreme Court of the Soviet Union sentenced him to death. The sentence was carried out on the same day. Schneersohn, along with other convicts, was buried in an unmarked mass grave at the Donskoye Cemetery. Schneersohn was rehabilitated posthumously on July 7, 1956.

New Jerusalem was considerably damaged during the Second World War. As a result, a significant portion of its collections was lost. Nevertheless, after a lengthy restoration, the museum reopened, and in 2014 moved to a new building near the historical buildings of the monastery.

Schneersohn was married twice: first to Sarah Guber-Grits, and then to Evgenia Radchenko. The parents of the latter were Stepan Radchenko and Lyubov Radchenko (Baranskaya), members of the Central Committee of the RSDLP. In the 1920s and 1930s, Radchenko worked as the scientific secretary of the New Jerusalem Museum. Schneersohn had children from both marriages.

== Further reading (in Russian) ==
- Радченко Е. С. Истринский краеведческий музей // Очерки истории музейного дела в СССР. Вып. 7. М., 1971. С.177-244 — статья, подробно освещающая деятельность Н. А. Шнеерсона на посту директора музея.
- Александра Орлова. Мой отец — Шнеерсон: каким он был, что сделал и что мог бы еще…. The Lechaim (in Russian).
- Гузеева, Ирина Андреевна. Евгения Степановна Радченко (1895–1986). Биография в документах: читая неопубликованные архивные материалы / И. А. Гузеева // 150 лет на службе науки и просвещения: сборник материалов Юбилейной международной научной конференции, Москва, 5-6 декабря 2013 г.. — Москва : Гос. публичная историческая б-ка России, 2014. — С. 341–353. — [13] с
- Биографическая справка: «Шнеерсон, Натан Александрович». В сборнике: Шулепова. Э. А. (ред.) Музееведческая мысль в России XVIII-XX веков: Сборник документов и материалов, 2010, Этерна, 957 с.
- Завадский А., Склез В., Суверина К., Политика аффекта. Музей как пространство публичной истории. Новое Литературное Обозрение, 2019, 398 с.
- Письмо к товарищу о наших организационных задачах // Ленин В. И. Полное собрание сочинений : в 55 т. / В. И. Ленин; Ин-т марксизма-ленинизма при ЦК КПСС — 5-е изд. — М.: Гос. изд-во полит. лит., 1967. — Т. 7. Сентябрь 1902 ~ сентябрь 1903. — С. 1—32.
- Ленинский сборник. Том VI. Москва-Ленинград, 1927 г. — С. 271
- Страница «Шнеерсон А. А.» в электронном Справочнике по истории Коммунистической партии и Советского Союза.
- Александра Шнееерсон-Орлова, Мария Шнеерсон. Потревоженные тени.
- Александра Шнееерсон-Орлова, Мария Шнеерсон. Потревоженные тени. Часть II.
