= Lyubavichi =

Lyubavichi (Russian: Любавичи) is the name of several rural localities in Russia:

- Lyubavichi, Monastyrshchinsky District, Smolensk Oblast, a village in Lyubavichskoye Rural Settlement of Monastyrshchinsky District in Smolensk Oblast
- Lyubavichi, Rudnyansky District, Smolensk Oblast, a village in Lyubavichskoye Rural Settlement of Rudnyansky District in Smolensk Oblast
