= Shmuel Schneersohn =

Fourth Chabad Rebbe

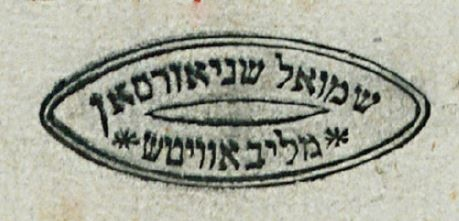
- Stamp of Shmuel Schneerson
- Title: Lubavitcher Rebbe

Personal life
- Born: Shmuel Schneersohn; 29 April 1834 OS Lyubavichi, Russian Empire
- Died: 14 September 1882 OS Lyubavichi, Russian Empire
- Buried: Lyubavichi
- Spouse: Sterna (daughter of his brother Chaim Shneur Zalman), Rivkah (granddaughter of Dovber Schneuri)
- Parents: Menachem Mendel Schneersohn (father); Chaya Mushka (daughter of Dovber Schneuri) (mother)
- Dynasty: Chabad Lubavitch

Religious life
- Religion: Judaism

Jewish leader
- Predecessor: Menachem Mendel Schneersohn
- Successor: Sholom Dovber Schneersohn
- Began: 17 March 1866
- Ended: 14 September 1882 OS
- Main work: Likutei Torah - Toras Shmuel
- Dynasty: Chabad Lubavitch

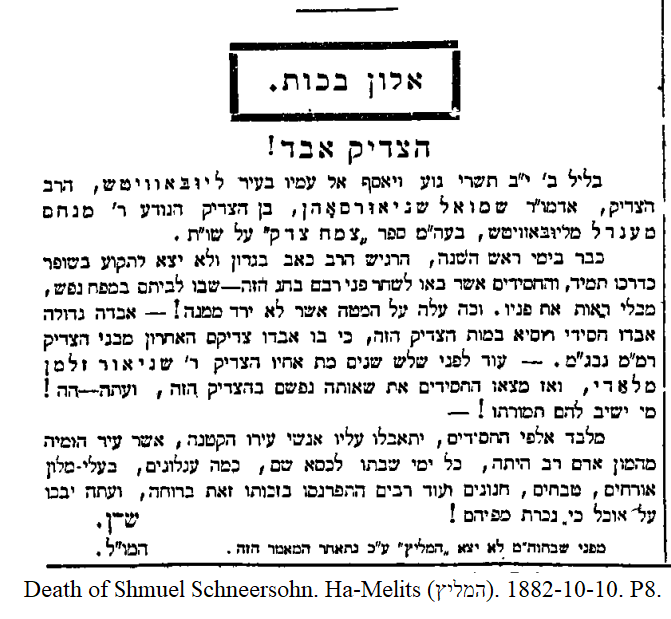
Death of Shmuel Schneersohn. Ha-Melits. 1882-10-10. P8.

Shmuel Schneersohn (29 April 1834 – 14 September 1882 OS), otherwise known as Rabbi Shmuel of Lubavitch or Maharash, was an Orthodox Jewish rabbi and the fourth Rebbe (spiritual leader) of the Hasidic movement of Chabad Lubavitch.

== Biography ==
Shmuel Schneersohn was born in Lyubavichi, on 2 Iyar 5594 (1834), the seventh son of Menachem Mendel Schneersohn. He faced competition from three of his brothers, primarily from Yehuda Leib Schneersohn who established a dynasty in Kapust upon their father's death. Other brothers also established dynasties in Lyady, Nizhyn, and Ovruch.

In 1848, Schneersohn was married to the daughter of his brother, Chaim Shneur Zalman Schneersohn. After several months she died, and in 1849 he married Rivkah, a granddaughter of Dovber Schneuri, the second Chabad Rebbe. Their children included Schneur Zalman Aharon, Shalom Dovber, Avraham Sender, Menachem Mendel, Devorah Leah and Chaya Mushka; Avraham Sender died in childhood.

Schneersohn was said to have had chariots on call for the evacuation of books in time of fire.

Besides his communal activism, he had wide intellectual interests. He spoke several languages, including Latin. He wrote widely on a range of religious and secular topics, and much of his writing has never been published and remains in manuscript form alone. His discourses began to be published for the first time under the title Likkutei Torat Shmuel in 1945 by Kehot, and 27 volumes have so far been printed.

Schneersohn was the first of the leaders of Chabad to compose Hemshechim. Previously a Chasidic discourse related directly to the occasion of its delivery, a Shabbat, holiday, etc.

He died in Lyubavichi, on 13 Tishrei 5643 (1882), leaving three sons and two daughters, and was succeeded by his son Sholom Dovber.

Schneersohn urged the study of Kabbalah as a prerequisite for one's humanity:

A person who is capable of comprehending the seder hishtalshelus (kabbalistic secrets concerning the coming-into-being of all existence every moment) - and fails to do so - cannot be considered a human being. At every moment and time one must know where his soul stands. It is a mitzvah (commandment) and an obligation to know the seder hishtalshelus.

== Works ==
- "Likkutei Torah L'Sholosh Parshiyos" - Discourses based on the first three parshiyos in Torah Ohr of the Alter Rebbe
- "Likkutei Torah - Toras Shmuel 5626-5642" 35 volumes - discourses in order of the parshiyos and festivals
- "Sefer hasichos Toras Shmuel"
- "Igros Kodesh" A collection of over 70 surviving letters and Halachik responsa

== Aphorisms ==
"The world says, 'If you can't crawl under, climb over.' But I say, Lechatchilah Ariber--'At the outset, one should climb over.'"

"You cannot fool God; ultimately, you cannot fool others either. The only one you can fool is yourself. And to fool a fool is no great achievement."

"because better is better, is good not good? rather good is good, and better is better!"

"Why are you demanding of me? Demand of yourself! If you toil and fill your mind with Torah there won't be any space for foreign thoughts! break your desires and you will feel great pleasure in prayer!"

Preceded by Menachem Mendel Schneersohn	Rebbe of Lubavitch; 1866—1882	Succeeded by Sholom Dovber Schneersohn
