= Yehuda Leib Schneersohn =

Ukrainian Habad Hasidic rabbi

Rabbi Yehuda Leib Schneersohn (1808–1866) was a Ukrainian Habad Hasidic rabbi, the second son of Menachem Mendel Schneersohn, and founder and first leader of Kopust Hasidism.

== Life and career ==
Known as the Maharil (an acronym for "Moreinu HaRav Yehuda Leib"), he settled in Kopust a few months after the death of his father, when he and his brothers were not able to reach an agreement about the succession. He died two months later. He had three sons:

- Rabbi Shlomo Zalman Schneersohn (1830–1900), oldest son of Rabbi Yehuda Leib, assumed his father's position in Kopust. He is the author of a work on Hasidism titled "Magen Avot" ("Shield of the Fathers"). Two months after the death of his father, Ha'Tzemach Tzedek, settled in the city of Kapust, located south of Vitebsk (today in Belarus), and began to lead the presidency there. Maharil was the oldest son who agreed to lead the rebbe, and even during his father's lifetime he led the rebbe, so most of the Hasidim flocked to him. Shmuel Schneerson is the one who is supposed to fill his father's place
- Rabbi Shalom Dovber Schneersohn of Rechitsa (died 1908), known as the Rashab of Rechitsa. Succeeding his brother, Rabbi Shlomo Zalman, Rabbi Shalom Dovber served as the Kopuster movement's rebbe in the town of Rechitsa. Rabbi Shalom Dovber seems to have died without a successor.
- Rabbi Shmaryahu Noah Schneersohn (1842–1924), known as Shmaryahu Noah of Babruysk. Succeeding his brother, Rabbi Shlomo Zalman, Rabbi Shmaryahu Noah served as the Kopuster movement's rebbe in the town of Babruysk. He was rav of the chasidim in Babruysk from 1872, and founded a yeshiva there in 1901. He authored a two volume work on Hasidism, titled "Shemen LaMaor" ("Light for the Luminary").
