= Menachem Mendel Schneersohn =

Third Chabad Rebbe (1789–1866)

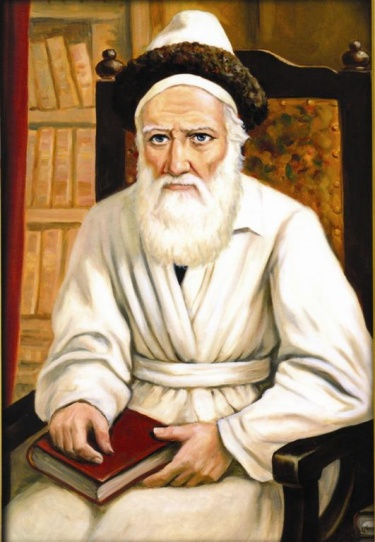
- The 3rd Lubavitcher Rebbe - the Tzemach Tzedek in his room wearing Shabbat garments
- Title: Lubavitcher Rebbe

Personal life
- Born: Menachem Mendel Schneersohn; September 9, 1789 OS Liozna, Russian Empire
- Died: March 17, 1866 (aged 76) OS Lyubavichi, Russian Empire
- Buried: Lyubavichi
- Spouse: Chaya Mushka Schneersohn
- Children: Baruch Shalom; Yehudah Leib; Chaim Shneur Zalman; Yisroel Noach; Yosef Yitzchak; Yaacov; Shmuel Schneersohn
- Parents: Shalom Shachna (father); Devorah Leah (mother)
- Dynasty: Chabad Lubavitch

Religious life
- Religion: Judaism

Jewish leader
- Predecessor: Dovber Schneuri
- Successor: Shmuel Schneersohn
- Began: May 5, 1831
- Ended: March 17, 1866 OS
- Main work: Derech Mitzvotecha (Sefer Hamitzvot)
- Dynasty: Chabad Lubavitch

Rabbi Menachem Mendel Schneersohn (Yiddish: מנחם מענדל שניאורסאהן; September 20, 1789 – March 17, 1866), also known as the Tzemach Tzedek (Hebrew: "Righteous Sprout" or "Righteous Scion"), was an Orthodox rabbi, leading 19th-century posek, and the third Rebbe (spiritual leader) of the Chabad Lubavitch Hasidic movement.

== Biography ==
Menachem Mendel Schneersohn was born in Liozna, on September 20, 1789 (September 9 OS). His mother Devorah Leah died three years later, and her father Rabbi Shneur Zalman of Liadi raised him as his own son. He married his first cousin Chaya Mushka Schneersohn, daughter of Rabbi Dovber Schneuri. After his father-in-law/uncle's death, and a three-year interregnum during which he tried to persuade the Hasidim to accept his brother-in-law Menachem-Nachum Schneuri or his uncle Chaim-Avraham as their leader, he assumed the leadership of Lubavitch on the eve of Shavuot 5591 (May 5, 1831, OS).

He was known as the Tzemach Tzedek after the title of a voluminous compendium of Halakha (Jewish law) that he authored. He also authored Derech Mitzvotecha ("Way of Your Commandments"), a mystical exposition of the Mitzvos. He compiled major works of Rabbi Shneur Zalman of Liadi for publication, including the Siddur L'Kol Ha'Shanah (commonly known as Siddur Im Dach), Likutei Torah and Torah Ohr. He also authored a philosophical text entitled Sefer HaChakira: Derech Emunah (Book of Philosophy: The Way of Faith).

He enjoyed close ties with other Jewish leaders. In the course of his battle against the Haskalah in Russia, he forged a close alliance with Rabbi Yitzchak of Valozhyn, a major leader of the misnagdim, which led to warmer relations between them and the Hasidim.

According to Baruch Epstein, his father Rabbi Yechiel Michel Epstein spent six months under the Schneersohn's tutelage, and learned most of his mystical knowledge during that time. This story is disputed by Hassidic historian Yehoshua Mondshine. Historian Eitam Henkin suggests that Rabbi Y. M. Epstein did meet with him, but only a few visits over a week or two, noting the testimony of Rabbi Yehuda Leib Maimon that he heard about this directly from his teacher.

His close friendship with Professor J Berstenson, the Czar's court physician, often helped the delicate negotiations relating to the welfare of the community. He set up an organisation called Hevras Techiyas Hameisim to assist Jewish boy-soldiers who were being recruited and converted to Christianity by the Russian army. These soldiers known as Cantonists were taken away from the Jewish community to other villages. Schneersohn arranged for his students to pay them regular visits to keep up their spirits and discourage them from converting.

In 1844–45 he took steps to increase the enrollment and viability of the Lubavitch yeshivas in Dubroŭna, Pasana, Lyozno, and Kalisz, expanding their enrollment to around 600 students in total. Repeated attempts by the authorities to entrap him using informers such as Hershel Hodesh, Benjamin the Apostate and Lipman Feldman failed.

== Death and legacy ==
He died in Lubavitch on March 17, 1866, at the age of 76, leaving seven sons. He was succeeded by his youngest son, Shmuel as the Rebbe of Lubavitch, while several other sons established separate Chabad branches, including Kopust, Liadi, Niezhin and Avrutch.

Several of his sons established Chasidic dynasties.

== Sons ==
He had seven sons:

1. Rabbi Baruch Shalom (1805–1869) did not become a rebbe in his own right; he chose to remain in Lubavitch and become a chasid of his youngest brother. Rabbi Menachem Mendel Schneerson, the seventh Rebbe of Chabad-Lubavitch, was his great-great-grandson.

2. Rabbi Yehuda Leib Schneersohn (Maharil) (1808–1866) settled in Kopys a few months after the death of his father, where he founded the Kopust branch of Chabad. He died two months later. He had three sons:

- Rabbi Shlomo Zalman Schneersohn (1830–1900), oldest son of Rabbi Yehuda Leib, assumed his father's position in Kopust. He is the author of a work on Hasidism titled "Magen Avot" ("Shield of the Fathers").
- Rabbi Shalom Dovber Schneersohn of Rechitsa (d. 1908), known as the Rashab of Rechitsa. Succeeding his brother, Rabbi Shlomo Zalman, Rabbi Shalom Dovber served as the Kopuster movement's rebbe in the town of Rechitsa. Rabbi Shalom Dovber seems to have died without a successor.
- Rabbi Shmaryahu Noah Schneersohn (1842–1924), known as Shmaryahu Noah of Babruysk. Succeeding his brother, Rabbi Shlomo Zalman, Rabbi Shmaryahu Noah served as the Kopuster movement's rebbe in the town of Babruysk. He was rav of the chasidim in Babruysk from 1872, and founded a yeshiva there in 1901. He authored a two volume work on Hasidism, titled "Shemen LaMaor" ("Light for the Luminary").

3. Rabbi Chaim Schneur Zalman (1814–1880) was Rebbe in Lyady after his father died. He founded the Liadi branch of Chabad. He was succeeded by his son, Rabbi Yitzchak Dovber (1835–1910) of Liadi, author of Siddur Maharid, and his son-in-law, Rabbi Levi Yitzchak (d. 1905) of Siratin, a scion of the Rebbe of Radzimin.

4. Rabbi Yisroel Noach (1815–1883) of Nizhyn founded the Niezhin branch of Chabad. Although officially a Rebbe, he had only a small following. He had no successor. His son was Rabbi Avraham Schneerson of Kischinev, whose daughter, Nechama Dina Schneersohn, married Rabbi Yosef Yitzchak Schneersohn, the sixth Rebbe of Chabad-Lubavitch.

5. Rabbi Yosef Yitzchak (1822–1876) was a Rebbe in Ovruch. He founded the Avrutch branch of Chabad. He was compelled to assume this position by his father-in-law, Rabbi Yaakov Yisroel of Cherkas (son of Rabbi Mordechai of Chernobyl and son-in-law of the Mitteler Rebbe) against his father's wishes. His daughter, Shterna Sarah, married the Rebbe Rashab. Thus, he was the maternal grandfather and namesake of Rabbi Yosef Yitzchak Schneersohn, the sixth Rebbe of Chabad-Lubavitch.

6. Rabbi Yaakov, although leaving descendants, died at quite a young age. He lived in Orsha. Little is known about him.

7. Rabbi Shmuel Schneersohn (Maharash) (1834–1882) of Lubavitch, his youngest son, succeeded him as the Rebbe of Lubavitch.

== Shu"t L'Tzemach Tzedek ==
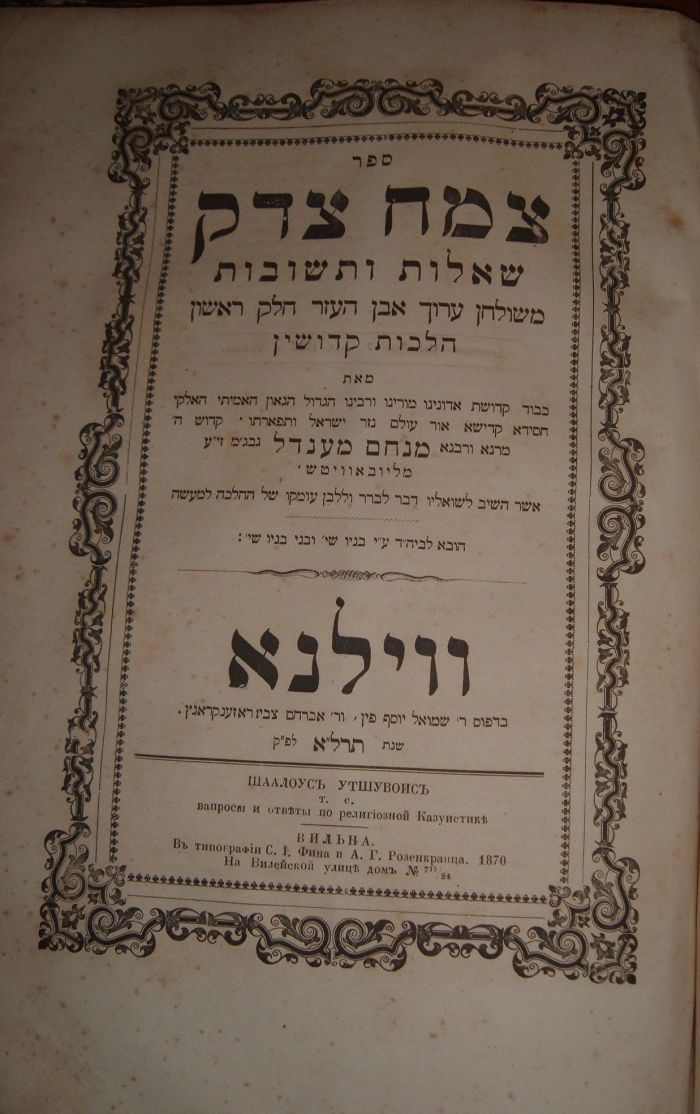
Tzemach Tzedek Responsa

== Notable students ==
- Rabbi Hillel Paritcher
- Rabbi Shneur Zalman Fradkin of Lublin

== Works ==
- Ohr HaTorah – a vast compendium of Chassidic discourses on the weekly torah portion, Tanach, and Jewish holidays (41 volumes)
- Sefer HaLikkutim – anthology of topics in Chassidic philosophy, organized alphabetically (27 volumes)
- Maamarei Admur HaTzemach Tzedek – Chassidic discourses (4 volumes)
- Biurei HaZohar Tzemach Tzedek – Chassidic discourses and explanations on the Zohar (3 volumes)
- Yahel Ohr – Chassidic commentary on the book of Psalms
- Derech Mitzvosecha – An explanation of the reasons for the Mitzvos according to Chassidic philosophy
- Tzemach Tzedek Shailos Uteshuvos – Halachik Responsa (7 volumes)
- Tzemach Tzedek Chiddushim Al HaShas – novellae on the Talmud
- Nesivos Tzemach Tzedek – a compilation of Halachic rulings and mystical insights focused specifically on the Talmudic tractate, Berachot
- Igros Kodesh – personal correspondence addressing Chassidic philosophy, and physical and spiritual guidance
- Sefer HaChakira: Derech Emunah – A philosophical text defending traditional Jewish faith through the lens of rational inquiry
- Kitzurim V'Haoros LeTanya – analytical notes, explanations, and structured summaries clarifying the Tanya

== Notes ==
Preceded by Dovber Schneuri	Rebbe of Lubavitch; 1831–1866	Succeeded by Shmuel Schneersohn
