= Shlomo Zalman Schneersohn =

Ukrainian Habad Hasidic rabbi

Admur Rabbi Shlomo Schneur Zalman Schneersohn
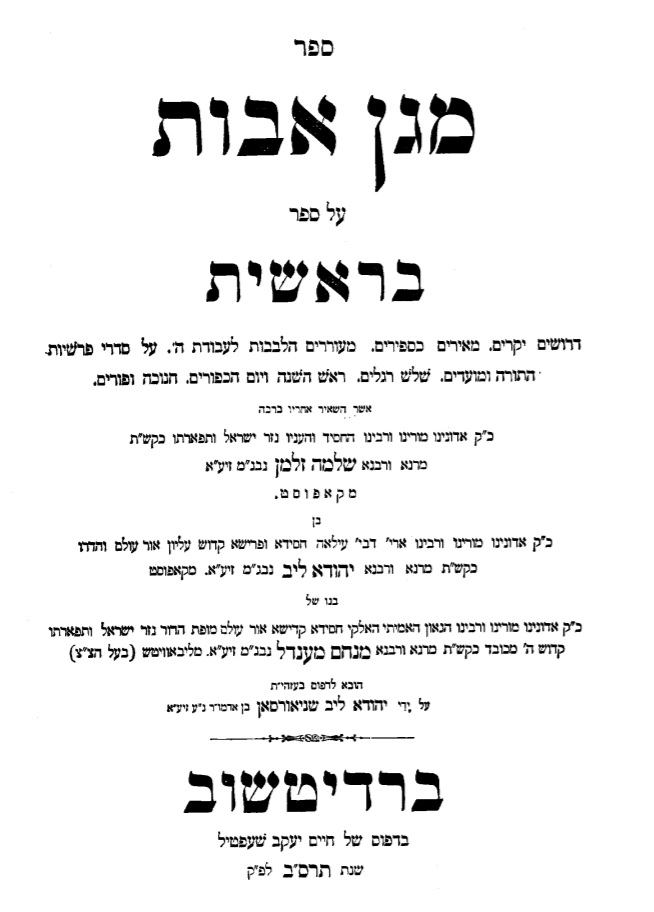
- Magen Avos (1902) by Shlomo Schneur Zalman Schneersohn

Personal life
- Born: Shlomo Schneur Zalman Schneersohn (שלמה שניאור זלמן שניאורסאן); 1830
- Died: 1900 (aged 69–70)
- Children: Yehuda Leib Schneersohn
- Parent: Rabbi Yehuda Leib Scheersohn (father)
- Dynasty: Kopust

Religious life
- Religion: Judaism

Jewish leader
- Predecessor: Rabbi Yehuda Leib Schneersohn of Kopust
- Dynasty: Kopust

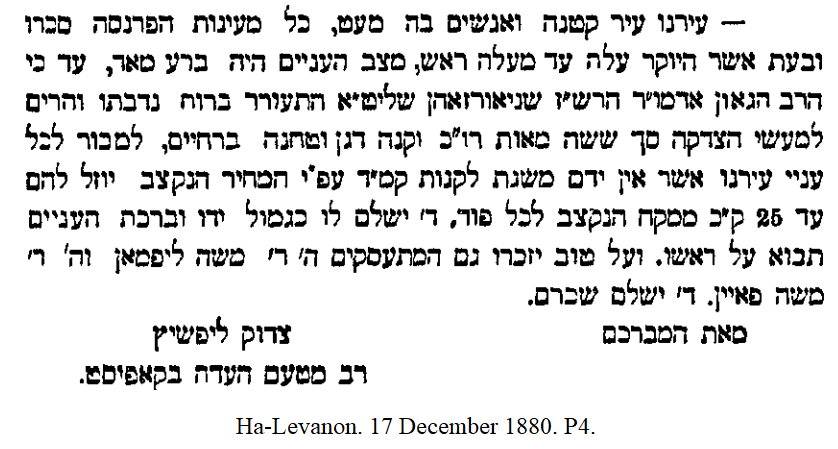
S. Z. Schneersohn discussed in Ha-Levanon. 17 December 1880. P4.

Shlomo Schneur Zalman Schneersohn (1830 – 1900) was a Ukrainian Habad Hasidic rabbi who was the second leader of Kopust Hasidism from 1866 to his death in 1900.

He was the son of Yehuda Leib Schneersohn, who founded the Kopust dynasty and was a grandson of the Menachem Mendel Schneersohn (the third Chabad Rebbe). He succeeded his father immediately following his death in 1866. He is the author of the 1902 text Magen Avot. He had a son Yehuda Leib.

Shlomo Zalman Schneersohn placed a portrait of his grandfather in his courtyard for his followers to see. The move is understood to help lend legitimacy to the Kapust branch of Chabad Hasidism.

== See also ==
- Chabad offshoot groups
