= Kopys =

Kopys Копысь
- Urban-type settlement
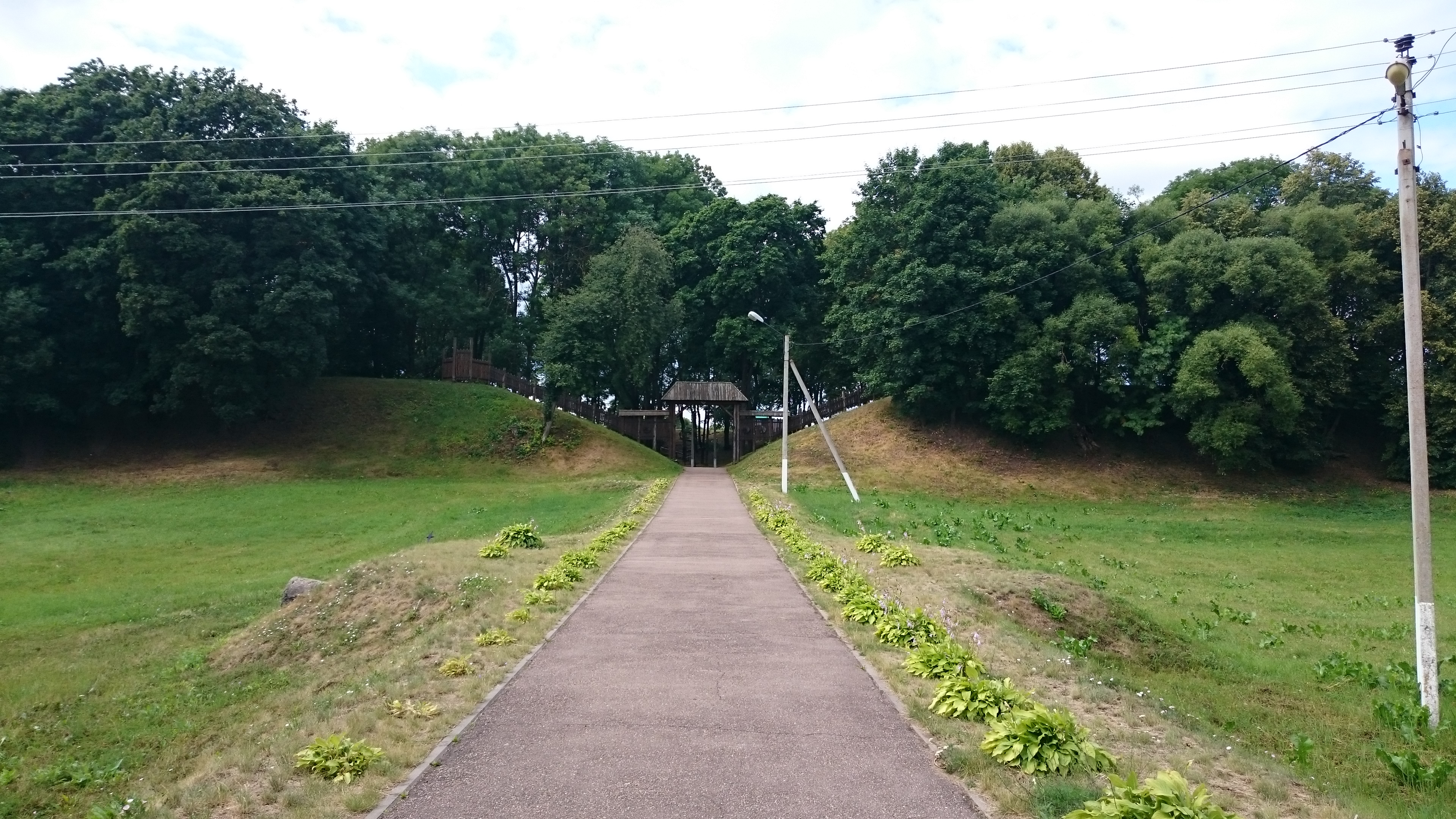
- Site of the former castle

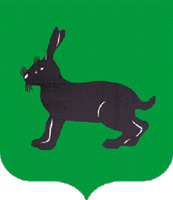
- Flag Coat of arms

- Location within Belarus
- Coordinates: 54°19′40″N 30°18′05″E
- Country: Belarus
- Region: Vitebsk Region
- District: Orsha District
- Population (2025): 600
- Time zone: UTC+3 (MSK)
- Area code: +375 216

Kopys (Note: Belarusian: Копысь; Russian: Копысь, IPA: [ˈkopɨsʲ]; Polish: Kopyś; Yiddish: קאָפּוסט, romanized: Kopust.) is an urban-type settlement in Orsha District, Vitebsk Region, Belarus. As of 2025, it has a population of 600.

== History ==
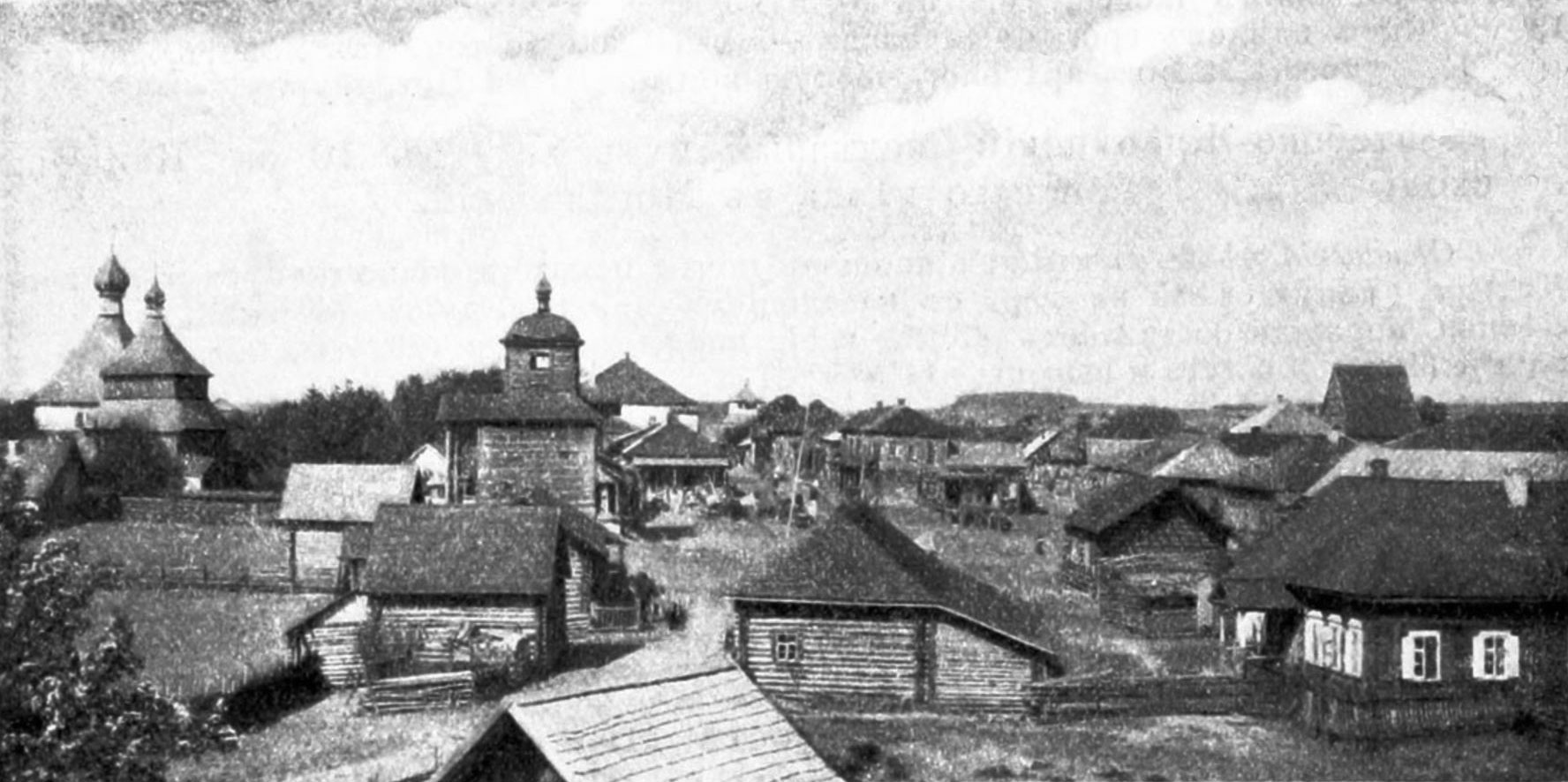
Early 20th-century view of Kopys

The first references to Kopys are dated at 1059. From the 14th century, it was part of the Grand Duchy of Lithuania and subsequently the Polish–Lithuanian Union after the Union of Krewo (1385). Administratively, it was part of the Vitebsk Voivodeship. It was granted town rights in the 16th century. It was a private town owned by the Ostrogski family and, after 1594, the Radziwiłł family. A castle stood in the town of Kopys and a Calvinist church was founded by Krzysztof Mikołaj Radziwiłł. During the Great Northern War, in 1707, Kopys was destroyed by Russian troops. In 1772, it became a part of the Russian Empire in the course of the First Partition of Poland.

The Kapust Hasidic dynasty originates in Kopys. By the end of the 18th century, there was a Jewish typography in the town.

== Notable people ==
- Alexander Lukashenko (born 1954), president of Belarus
- David Remez (1886–1951), Israeli politician
- Veniamin Blazhenny (1921–1999), poet
