= Lyubavichi, Rudnyansky District, Smolensk Oblast =

Lyubavichi Любавичи ליובאוויטש (Yiddish)
- Village
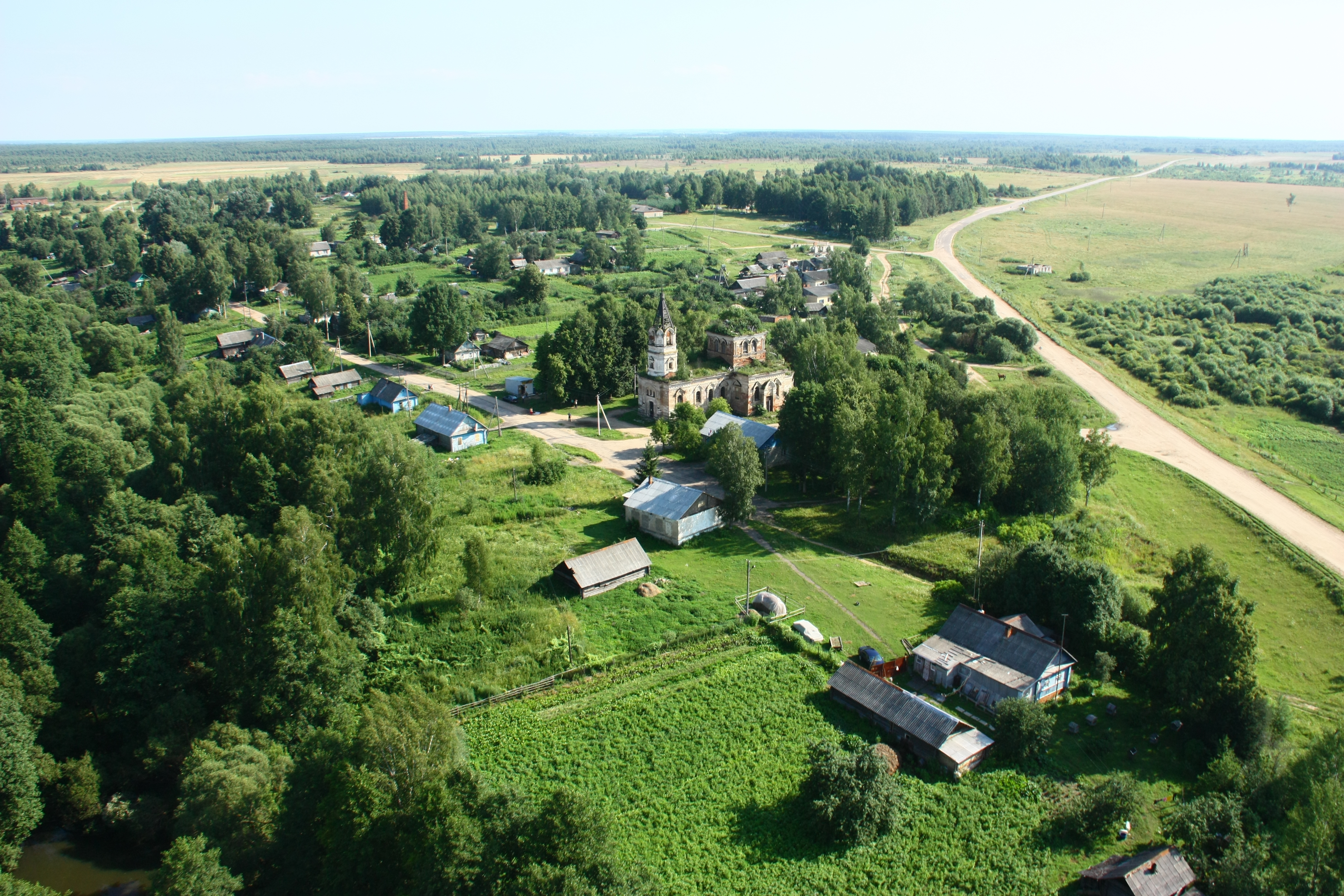
- Aerial view of Lyubavichi
- Interactive map of Lyubavichi
- Location of Lyubavichi Lyubavichi (Smolensk Oblast)
- Coordinates: 54°50′N 30°58′E
- Country: Russia
- Federal subject: Smolensk Oblast
- Administrative district: Rudnyansky District
- Rural settlementSelsoviet: Lyubavichskoye Rural Settlement
- First mentioned: c. 1654

Area
  - Total: 1.44 km^{2} (0.56 sq mi)

Population
  - Estimate (2007): 460 )
  - Density: 319.44/km^{2} (827.3/sq mi)

Administrative status
  - Capital of: Lyubavichskoye Rural Settlement

Municipal status
  - Municipal district: Rudnyansky Municipal District
  - Rural settlement: Lyubavichskoye Rural Settlement
  - Capital of: Lyubavichskoye Rural Settlement
- Time zone: UTC+3 (MSK)
- Postal code: 216774
- Dialing code: +7 48141
- OKTMO ID: 66638450101

Lyubavichi (Russian: Любавичи; Belarusian: Любавічы, romanized: Lyubavichy; Yiddish: ליובאַװיטש, Lyubavitsh) is a rural locality (a village) in Rudnyansky District of Smolensk Oblast, Russia.

== History ==
The village existed in what was the Polish–Lithuanian Commonwealth since at least 1654. In 1784, it was mentioned as a small town, then a possession of the Polish princely family the Lubomirski. According to Chabad-Lubavitch tradition the settlement was originally founded by a Jew named Meir. After the partitions of the Polish–Lithuanian Commonwealth, the village was annexed by the Russian Empire. During the French invasion of Russia in 1812, the village was occupied by Napoleonic troops for two weeks.

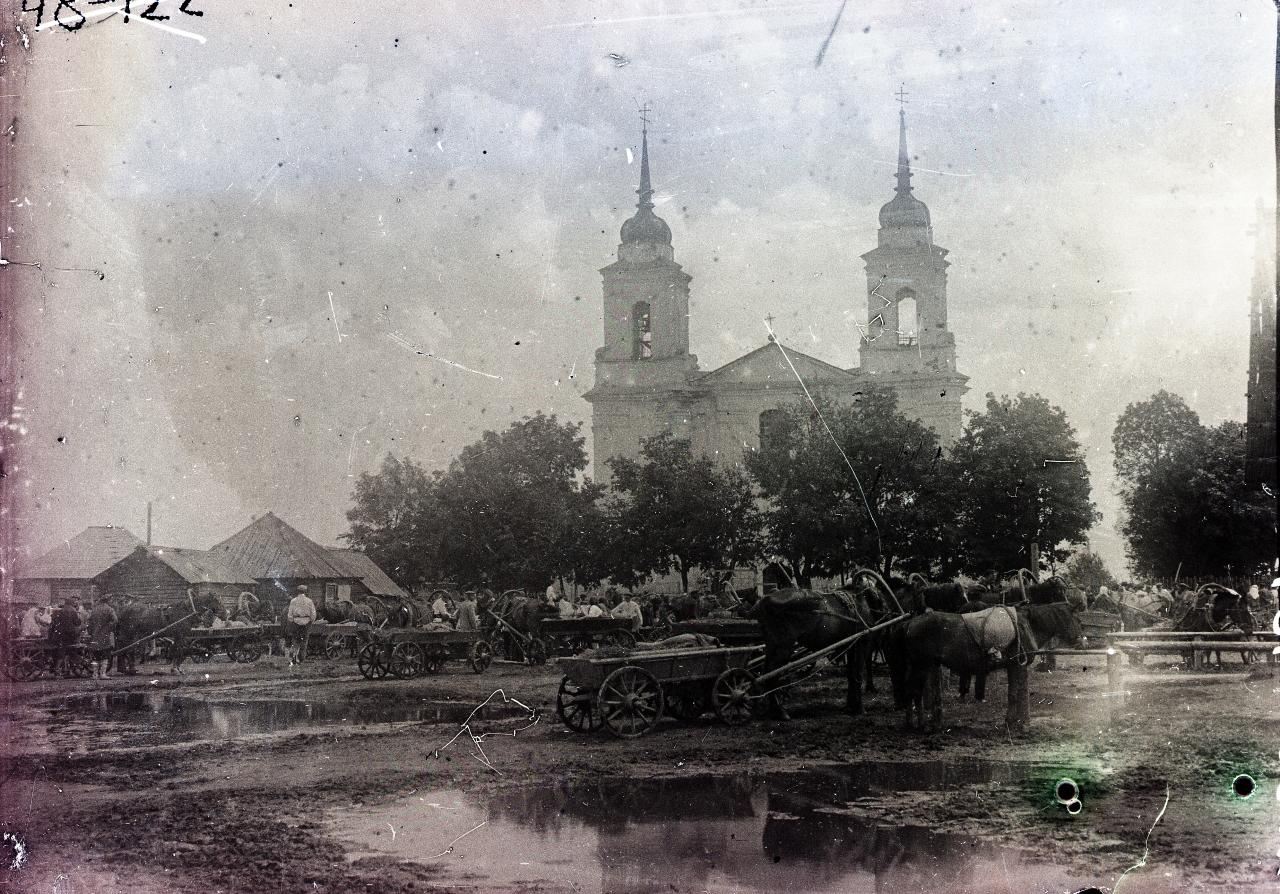
Church and market in Lyubavichi (December 1929)

During the reign of the Russian Empire, the village was in Orshansky Uyezd of Mogilev Governorate. In 1857, it had a population of 2,500. Another source from approximately 1880 reports a total of 1,516 inhabitants (978 Jews) with 313 houses, two Russian Orthodox churches, and two Jewish synagogues.

In the late 19th and early 20th centuries, Lyubavichi was the largest market within the Mogilev Governorate, with annual sales of more than 1.5 million rubles.

== Jewish community ==
The Jewish population of Lyubavichi was 1,164 in 1847 and 1,660 in 1897. The village's economy declined after the 1917 Russian Revolution and religious Jews were persecuted by the Yevsektsiya. The Jewish population was 967 in 1926, half of the total population. During the German invasion of Russia, the German military entered Lyubavichi in August 1941, established a ghetto, and massacred the 483 remaining Jews on November 4, 1941.

== Chabad-Lubavitch dynasty ==
The village lends its name to the Chabad-Lubavitch branch of Hasidic Judaism, where its leadership established a court and was the seat of four generations of Chabad Rebbes between 1813 and 1915.

The second Chabad Rebbe, Dovber Schneuri (1773–1827), moved from Lyady to Lyubavichi in 1813. The third Rebbe of Chabad, Menachem Mendel Schneersohn (1789–1866), and the fourth Rebbe, Shmuel Schneersohn (1834–1882) are buried in Lyubavichi.

The fifth Rebbe, Sholom Dovber Schneersohn (1860–1920), established the Yeshivah Tomchei Temimim Lubavitch in the village in the summer of 1897. In the fall of 1915, the rebbe evacuated his Hassidic court to Rostov, Russia with the onset of World War I. The central yeshivah was disbanded in 1917, and its students went into exile before its reestablishment by the Rebbe in Rostov.

The Chabad movement opened an information center in the village in 2008 called Hatzer Raboteinu Nesieinu Belubavitch. The center is in the former Jewish area of the village, and close to the graves of the two Rebbes. The European Conference of Shluchim brought 500 Chabad rabbis to the village in August 2016 to visit the graves and tour the village.

== Gallery ==
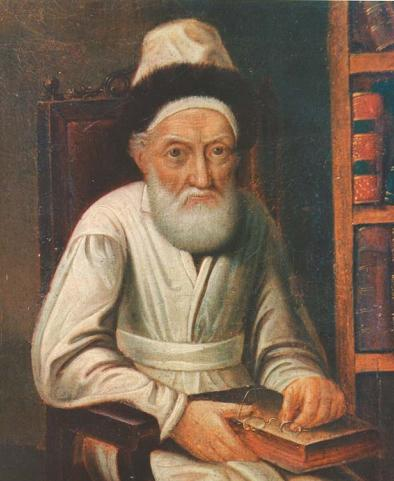
Menachem Mendel Schneersohn (1789–1866), 3rd Rebbe of Chabad Hasidism is buried in Lyubavichi, along with his successor Shmuel Schneersohn (1834–1882)

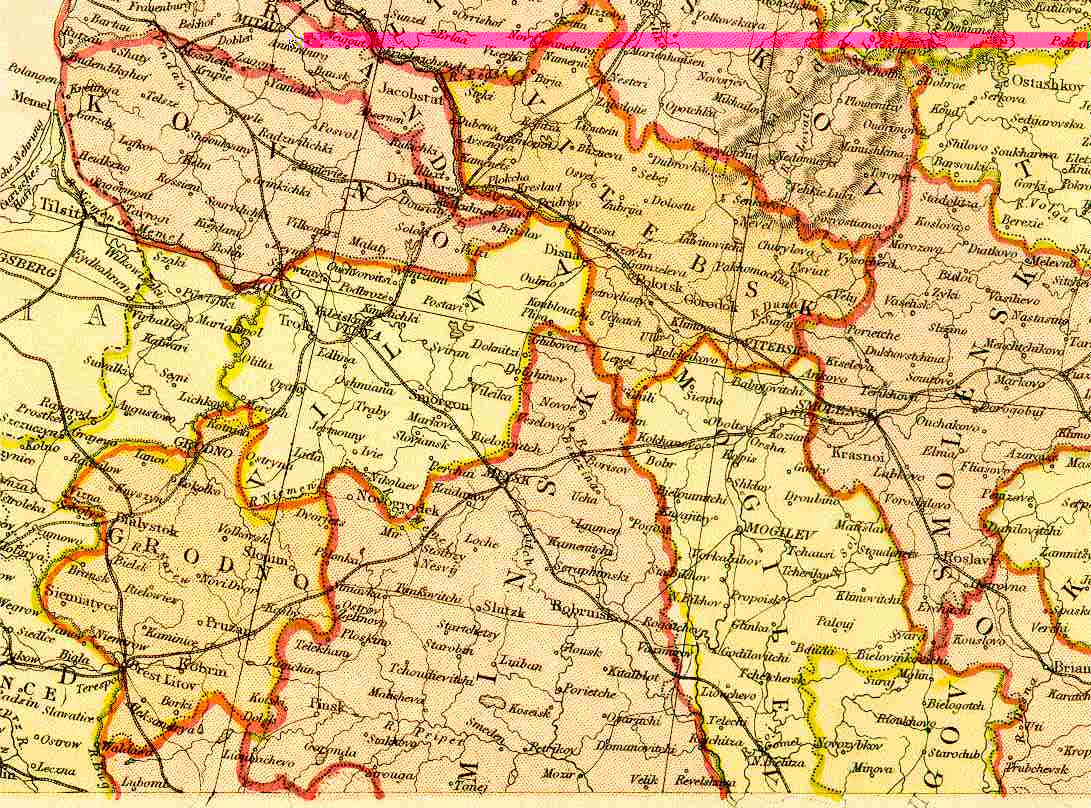
1882 map of White Russia regions. In the Russian Empire, Lyubavichi was a part of Mogilev Governorate (present-day Belarus)

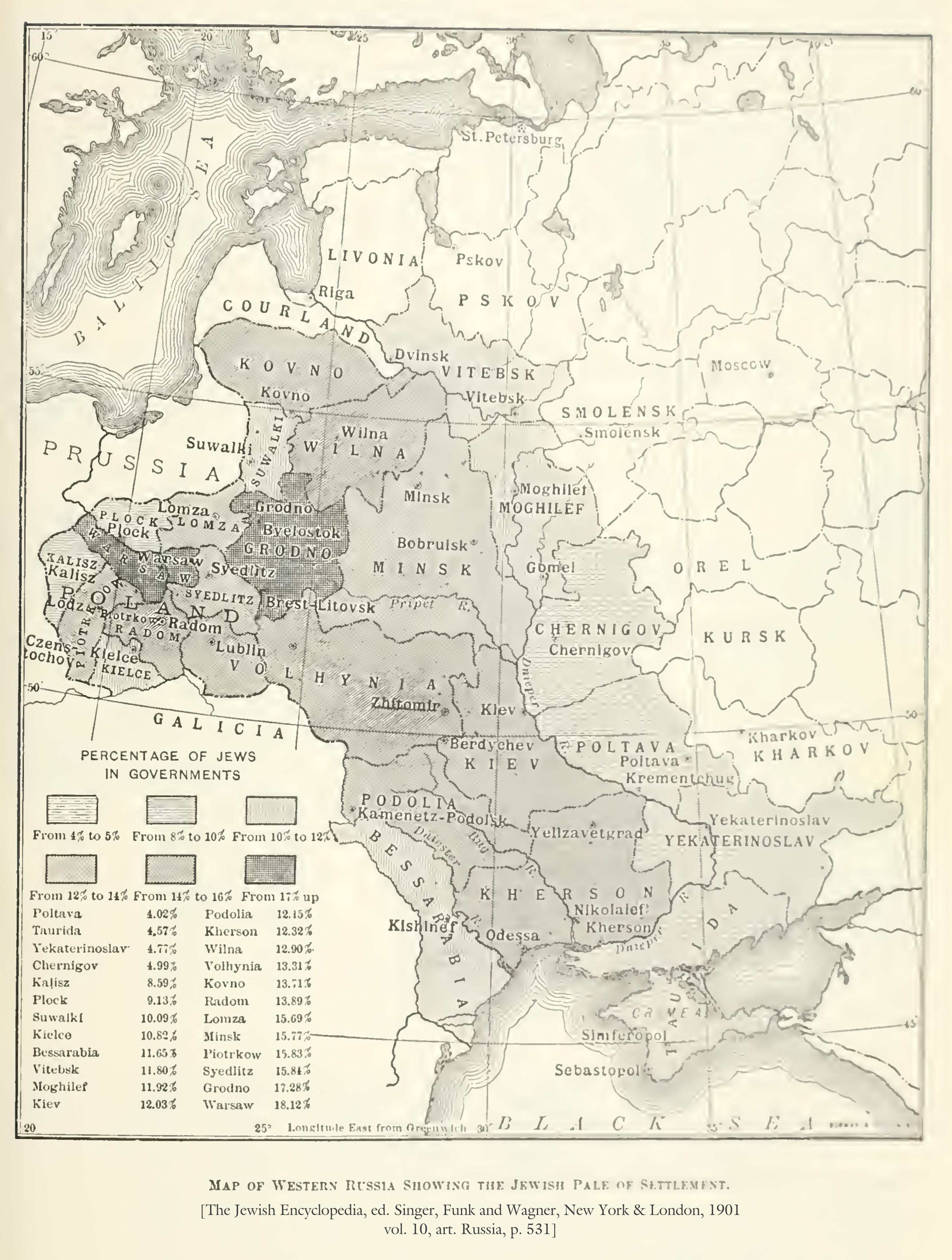
The Russian Empire Pale of Settlement where Jews were permitted to live. Shows Mogilev Governorate at the northeastern edge

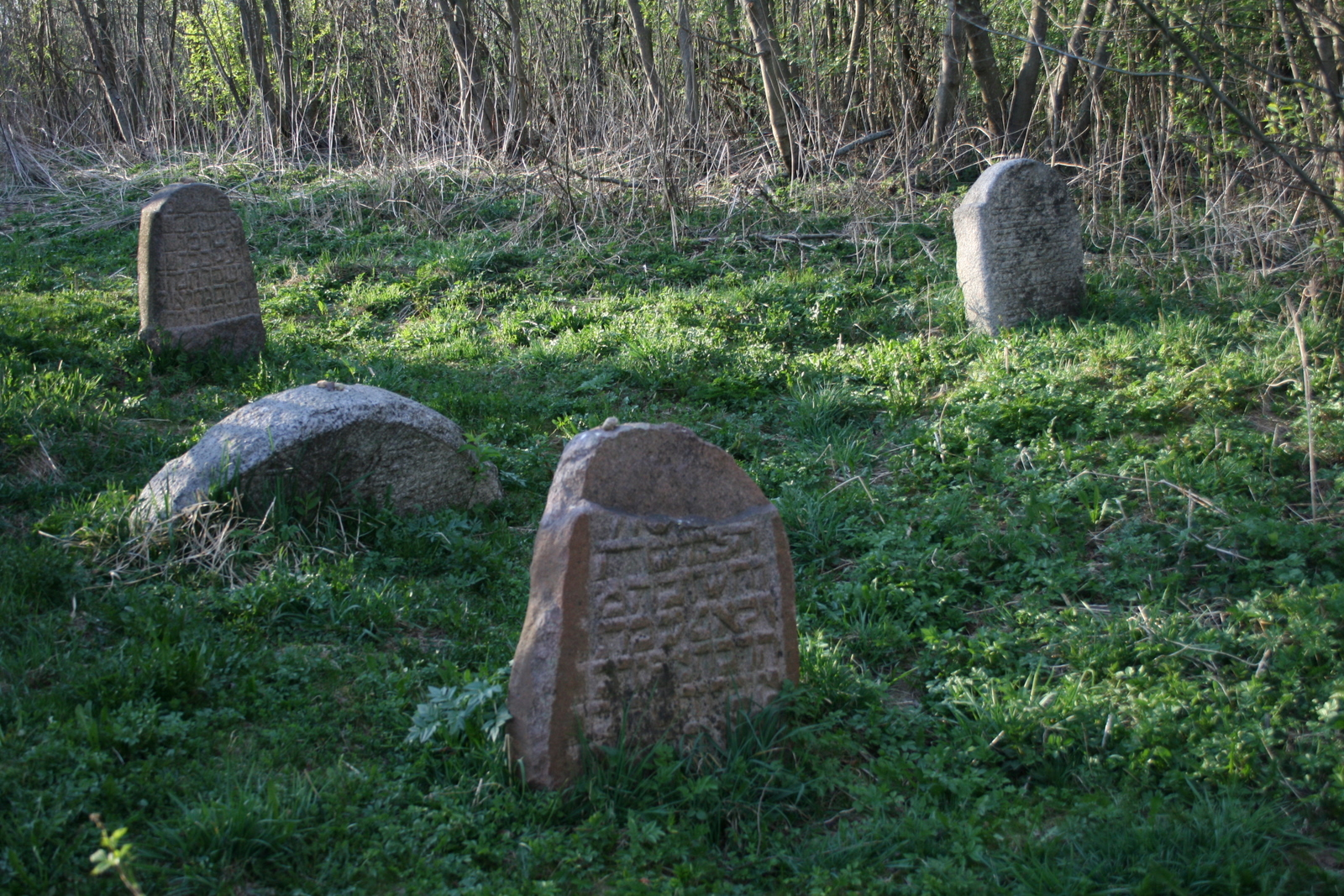
Jewish cemetery in Lyubavichi

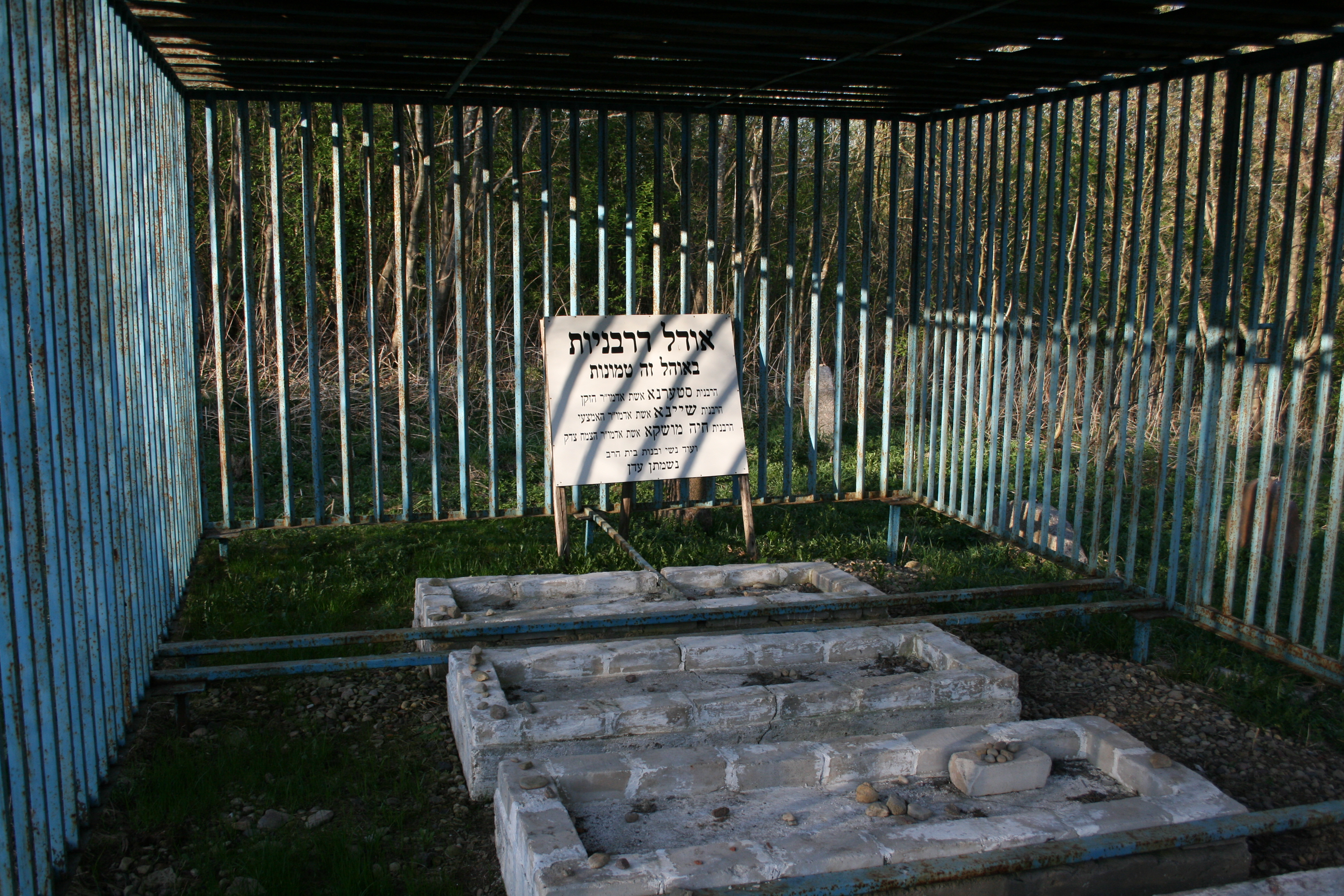
Ohel graves of Wives in the Chabad dynasty in Lyubavichi

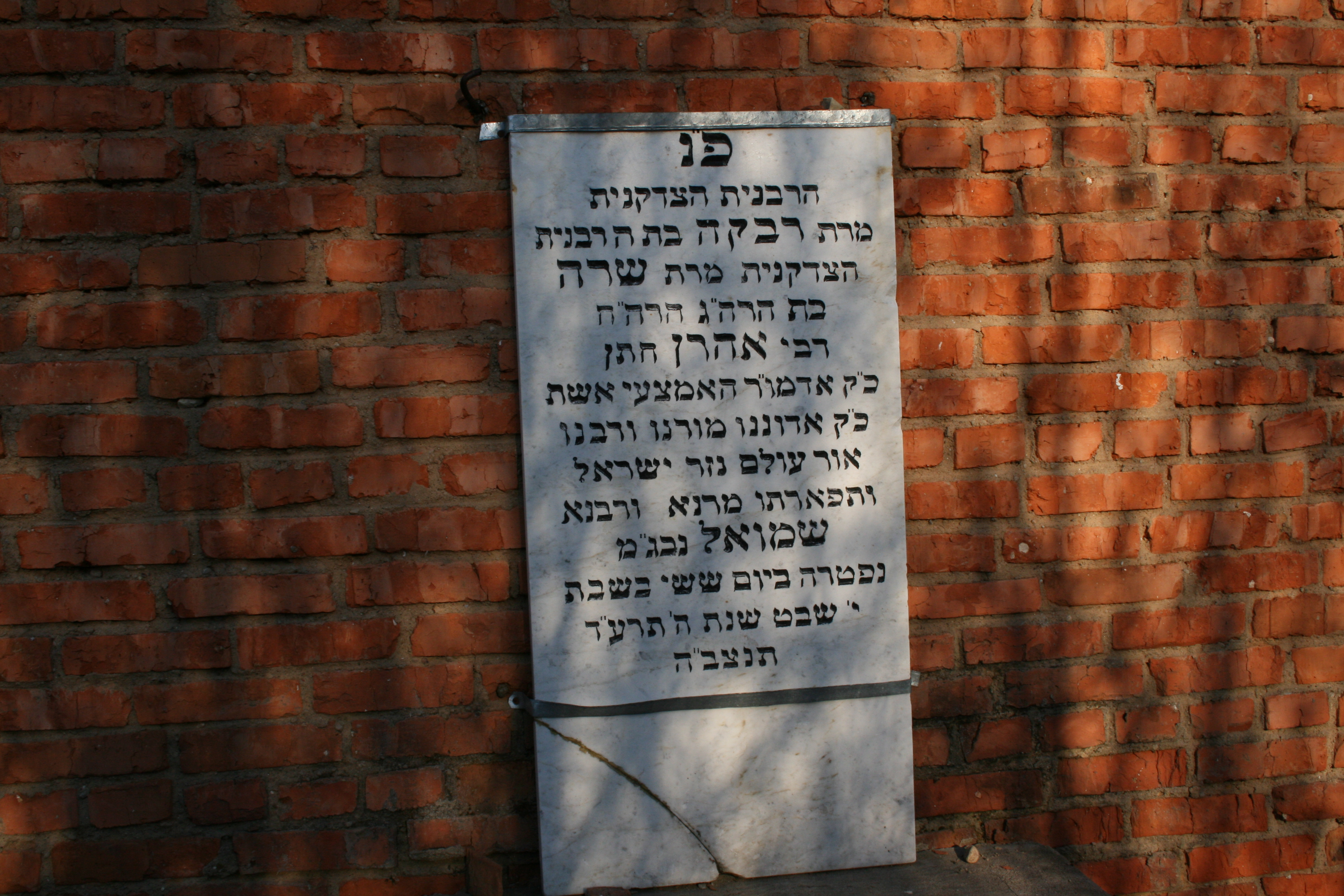
Chabad dynasty grave headstone

== Climate ==
Lyubavichi has a warm-summer humid continental climate (Dfb in the Köppen climate classification).

Climate data for Lyubavichi
Month	Jan	Feb	Mar	Apr	May	Jun	Jul	Aug	Sep	Oct	Nov	Dec	Year
Mean daily maximum °C (°F)	−4.0 (24.8)	−3.1 (26.4)	2.4 (36.3)	11.2 (52.2)	17.2 (63.0)	20.5 (68.9)	22.9 (73.2)	21.6 (70.9)	16.0 (60.8)	8.7 (47.7)	2.7 (36.9)	−1.2 (29.8)	9.6 (49.2)
Daily mean °C (°F)	−6.0 (21.2)	−5.6 (21.9)	−0.9 (30.4)	6.7 (44.1)	13.0 (55.4)	16.7 (62.1)	19.1 (66.4)	17.8 (64.0)	12.5 (54.5)	6.2 (43.2)	1.0 (33.8)	−2.9 (26.8)	6.5 (43.7)
Mean daily minimum °C (°F)	−8.3 (17.1)	−8.5 (16.7)	−4.5 (23.9)	1.8 (35.2)	7.9 (46.2)	11.9 (53.4)	14.6 (58.3)	13.7 (56.7)	8.8 (47.8)	3.6 (38.5)	−0.8 (30.6)	−4.9 (23.2)	2.9 (37.3)
Average precipitation mm (inches)	53 (2.1)	48 (1.9)	46 (1.8)	47 (1.9)	72 (2.8)	80 (3.1)	96 (3.8)	79 (3.1)	64 (2.5)	66 (2.6)	57 (2.2)	51 (2.0)	759 (29.8)
Source: https://en.climate-data.org/asia/russian-federation/smolensk-oblast/lyubavichi-745753/

== Sources ==
- Администрация Смоленской области. Постановление №261 от 30 апреля 2008 г. «Об утверждении реестра административно-территориальных единиц и территориальных единиц Смоленской области», в ред. Постановления №464 от 27 июня 2014 г. «О внесении изменений в реестр административно-территориальных единиц и территориальных единиц Смоленской области». Опубликован: База данных "Консультант-плюс". (Administration of Smolensk Oblast. Resolution #261 of April 30, 2008 On the Adoption of the Registry of the Administrative-Territorial Units and Territorial Units of Smolensk Oblast, as amended by the Resolution #464 of June 27, 2014 On Amending the Registry of the Administrative-Territorial Units and Territorial Units of Smolensk Oblast. ).
- Смоленская областная Дума. Закон №76-з от 1 декабря 2004 г. «О наделении статусом муниципального района муниципального образования Руднянский район Смоленской области, об установлении границ муниципальных образований, территории которых входят в его состав, и наделении их соответствующим статусом», в ред. Закона №111-з от 23 ноября 2011 г. «О внесении изменений в областной Закон "О наделении статусом муниципального района муниципального образования Руднянский район Смоленской области, об установлении границ муниципальных образований, территории которых входят в его состав, и наделении их соответствующим статусом"». Вступил в силу со дня официального опубликования. Опубликован: "Вестник Смоленской областной Думы и Администрации Смоленской области", №12, часть II, стр. 104, 5 декабря 2004 г. (Smolensk Oblast Duma. Law #76-z of December 1, 2004 On Granting the Status of the Municipal District to the Municipal Formation of Rudnyansky District of Smolensk Oblast, on Establishing the Borders of the Municipal Formations Whose Territories It Comprises, and on Granting Them Appropriate Status, as amended by the Law #111-z of November 23, 2011 On Amending the Oblast Law "On Granting the Status of the Municipal District to the Municipal Formation of Rudnyansky District of Smolensk Oblast, on Establishing the Borders of the Municipal Formations Whose Territories It Comprises, and on Granting Them Appropriate Status". Effective as of the official publication date.).
