= Shmaryahu Noah Schneersohn =

Russian rabbi (1842–1923)

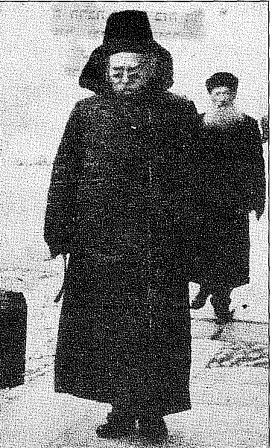
Schneersohn

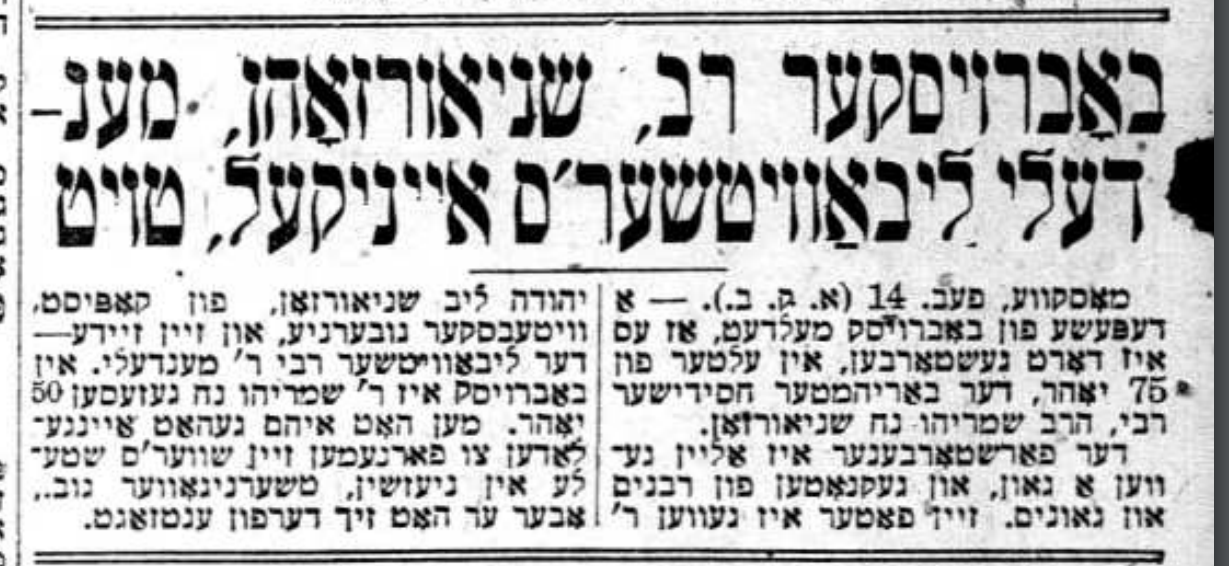
Article reporting Scheersohn's death, 14 February 1923

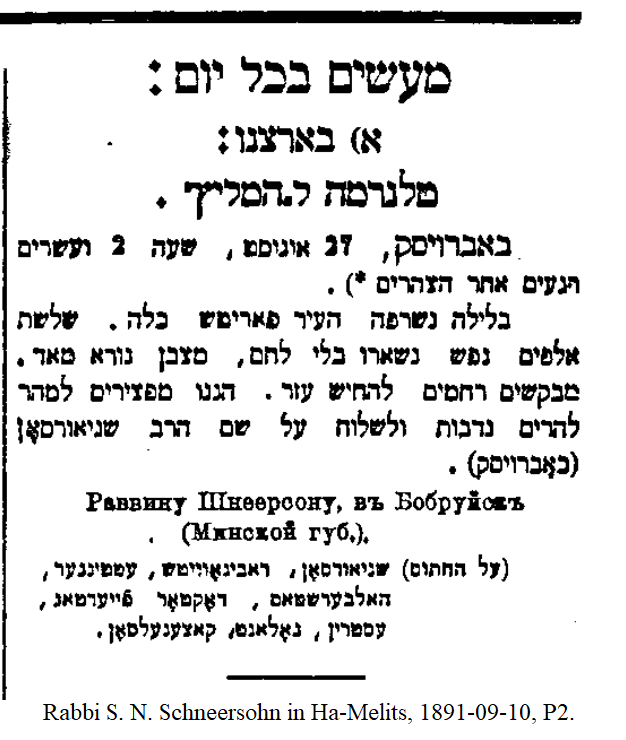
S. N. Schneersohn in Ha-Melits, 1891-09-10, P2.

Shmaryahu Noah Schneersohn (1842–1923) was the fourth and last rebbe of Kopust, a branch of the Chabad dynasty of Hasidism. He succeeded as 4th leader of the group after his brother, Shalom Dovber Schneersohn, died. Other sources say he succeeded his brother, Shlomo Zalman Schneersohn, as leader of the group in 1900 after Shlomo Zalman died. He served as the Kopuster movement's rebbe in the town of Babruysk. He was rabbi of the chasidim in Babruysk from 1872, and founded a yeshiva there in 1901. He authored a two-volume work on Hasidism, titled "Shemen LaMaor" ("Light for the Luminary").

== Works ==
Schneersohn is the author of a two-volume work on Hasidic thought, titled Shemen LaMaor ("Oil for the Luminary").
