= Judaism in Nepal =

In 1986, the Israeli embassy in Kathmandu organized a Passover celebration as a service to the 7,000 Israelis who visit Nepal annually. The celebration was taken over in 1999 by the Chabad (/ħabad/) movement, a Hassidic Jewish movement that specializes in outreach to nonobservant Jews. Prior to 1986, there was no organized practice of Judaism in Nepal, and there is no native Jewish community.

The Nepalese Chabad center has achieved notability for the Passover celebration which is noted to be the largest such celebration in the world, with 1500 participants. The couple who run the center were models for a television series in Israel.

The Jerusalem-based NGO Tevel B'Tzedek ('The world with Justice'), under its orthodox head Micha Odenheimer has organized many Israeli youths to travel to Nepalese villages and provide help to handle modernization, teaching efficient forms of irrigation and agriculture to outlying villages. The organization maintains a local staff of 50 Nepalese.

== Passover seders ==
In 1986, the Israeli embassy in the Thamel section of Kathmandu started the tradition of holding a Passover Seder for Israeli travelers. In 1999, the Chabad house took over the event.

By 2006, the annual Passover seder sponsored by Chabad hosted 1,500 participants. It has been called the "world's largest seder", requiring 1,100 pounds of Matzo, the ritual unleavened bread of the festival. By 2014 the event drew 1,700 attendees, though the ceremony was threatened by a strike that delayed a shipment of Matzo.

== Growth of Chabad house in Nepal ==
The Chabad movement maintains houses throughout the world, to provide services to the local Jewish communities and to Jewish travellers. The Chabad house in Kathmandu was opened in 2000 by Rabbi Chezki Lifshitz and his wife Chani.

According to Chani, the movement had difficulty finding shlichim (emissaries) to go to Nepal. "They couldn’t find shluchim [emissaries] willing to go to such a third-world country,” she said in an interview. “We were the crazy couple willing to do it."

The house was a success, and the movement opened two satellite houses in Nepal, one in the city of Pokhara in November 2007, and a third in Manang in April 2010.

In May 2012, the Israeli television network Reshet launched the miniseries Kathmandu, starring Israeli actor Michael ("Moni") Moshonov, based on true events from Chabad house Nepal. The series ran for 13 episodes.

Besides being the model for the television series, Chabad house has often made news. In October 2013, Rabbi Lifshitz prevented the cremation of a religious Jewish woman from Australia who was killed in a traffic accident. Cremation, customary in Nepal, is forbidden by orthodox Judaism. The organization was also involved in recovery of the remains of a New Jersey woman killed in a plane crash in the Himalayas. The house has been featured in numerous magazines, including The Atlantic, the Jerusalem Post, and other media.

== Israeli tourism in Nepal ==
According to the Nepal Ministry of Tourism, 7,151 Israelis visited Nepal in 2012, staying an average of 16 days. Although Israelis comprise only about one percent of total tourism in Nepal, their mark is noticeable. "Any visitor to Nepal is guaranteed to hear Hebrew being spoken in the streets and to see Hebrew signs and T-shirts in the main tourist locations," writes Rabbi Ben in his travel blog "The Travelling Rabbi".

Jewish religious leaders have expressed concern that many Israeli and American Jews visit Nepal in a spiritual quest that distances them from their Jewish roots. "The antipathy to religious ritual that many Israeli Jews have inherited from that early generation of founding Zionists, leads many of them to search for spiritual fulfillment in Nepal or India...," writes Rabbi Daniel Gordis. "Ashrams in Nepal and India are filled with young Jewish people, mostly American and Israeli." In fact, however, very few Israelis go to Nepal for spiritual reasons – 62 in 2012, or less than one percent of all Israeli visitors to the country, and far below the average of 14 percent for all nationalities. It is unknown how many Americans of Jewish extraction visit Nepal for spiritual reasons.

== Other Jewish links to Nepal ==
The French Jewish scholar Sylvain Lévi visited Nepal in 1898 and published a three-volume historical study (Le Népal: Étude historique d’un royaume hindou, 1905–1908), considered the authoritative Western account of the country for most of the 20th century. Lévi later wrote a comparative study of the Jewish and Hindu religions, based on his Nepalese researches

The Hong Kong–based Jewish Kadoorie family has been involved with philanthropy in Nepal (as elsewhere in Asia), particularly serving Gurkha communities, and Horace Kadoorie was awarded the Order of Gorkha Dakshina Bahu (First Class) by the Nepalese government.

== Security concerns ==
The U.S. State Department has found antisemitism to be "not an issue of any significance" in Nepal, and has reported no antisemitic acts in annual reports on the country.

Haaretz reported in 2013 that an Iranian suspected of planning terror attack on the Israeli embassy was arrested by embassy security personnel and handed over to the police in Kathmandu, Nepal.

The Times of India reported in 2014 that Indian security forces had foiled a plot by the Indian Mujahideen to kidnap Jewish tourists in Nepal to be used in exchange for the female Pakistani scientist Aafia Siddiqui held in a US jail, and that the organization had rented a hiding place in the hills of Nepal to hold their hostages captive.

== Israel–Nepal relations ==
Israel–Nepal relations, established on 1 June 1960, are the relations between Israel and Nepal. This makes Nepal one of the first Asian countries to have diplomatic ties with Israel.
