= Mitzvah tank =

Mobile Chabad outreach center

A Mitzvah tank is a vehicle used by the Orthodox Jewish practitioners of Chabad-Lubavitch Hasidism as a portable "educational and outreach center" and "mini-synagogue" (or "minagogue") to reach out to non-observant and alienated Jews. Mitzvah tanks have been commonplace on the streets of New York City since 1974. Today they are found all over the globe in countries where Chabad is active.

== Terminology ==
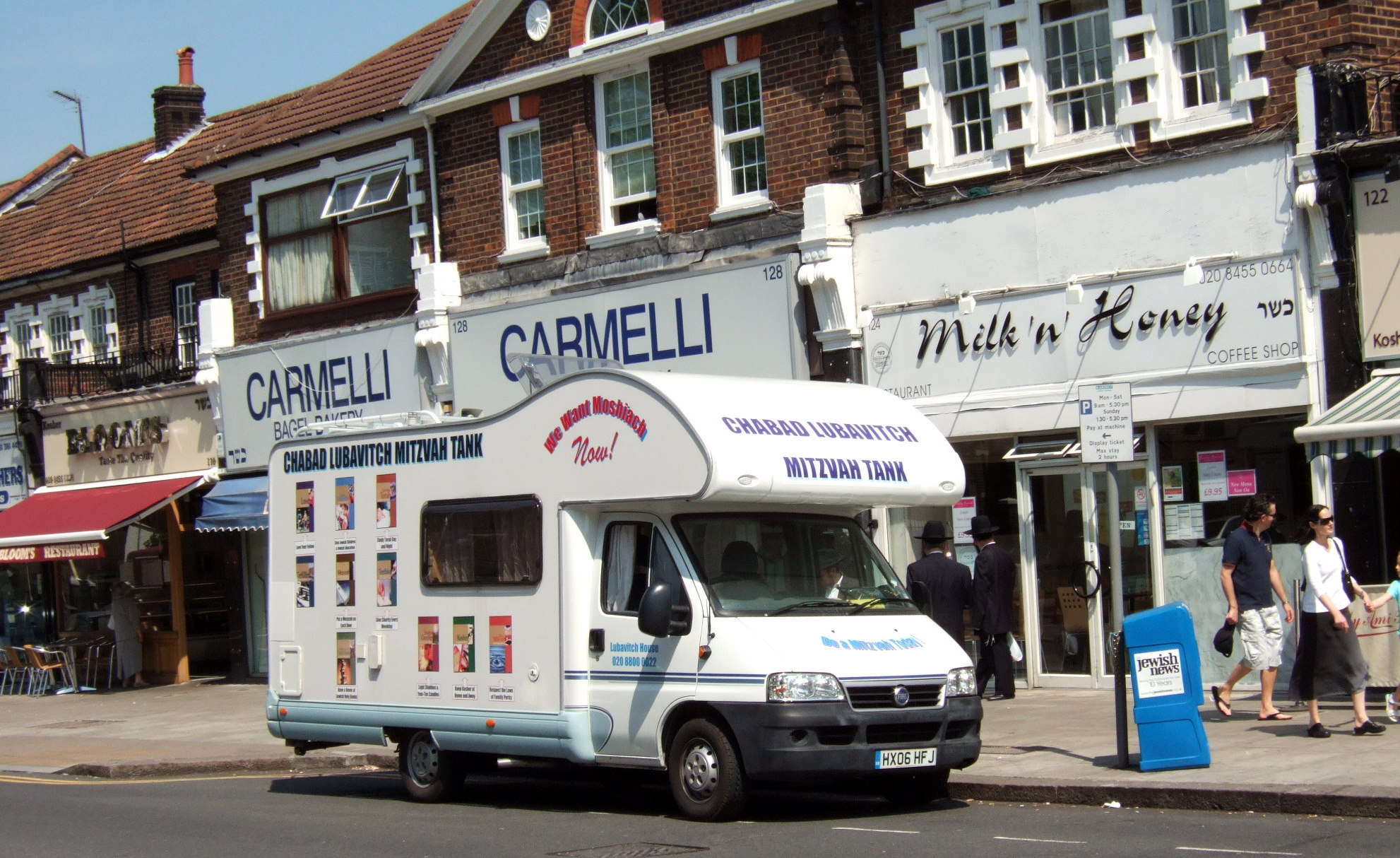
Chabad Lubavitch Mitzvah tank in Golders Green, London

The word mitzvah means a "commandment" of the Torah in Judaism, but also carries with it the connotation of a good deed. Lubavitchers use these vehicles to spread the teachings of Judaism to the Jewish masses in "military fashion" in which "campaigns" and battles are fought, hence naming the vans and trucks "tanks".

The strategy behind the Mitzvah tank "campaigns" was designed and encouraged by the seventh rebbe of Chabad Lubavitch, Rabbi Menachem Mendel Schneerson .

== Appearance and description ==
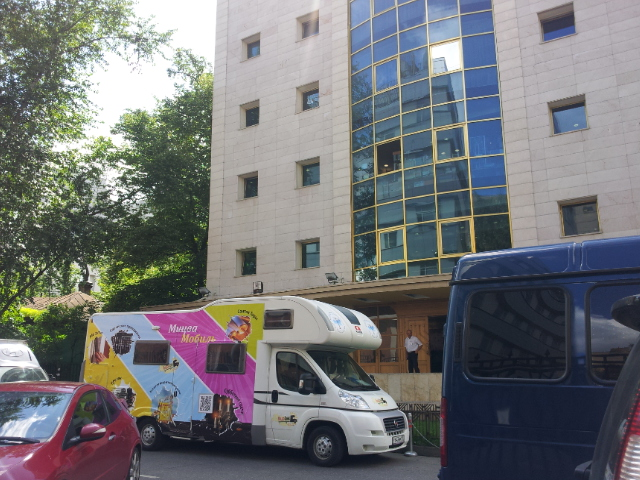
A Mitzvah Tank at the entrance of the Moscow Jewish community center – Chabad Lubavitch, June 2013

Mitzvah tanks can be vans, travel trailers, recreational vehicles, campervan or pickup trucks. On Sukkot, vehicles may be fitted with a portable Sukkah (the Sukkah-mobile). Mitzvah tanks are put into operation on the eve of major Jewish holidays and Fridays prior to Shabbat. The vehicles often have large banners or logos on them, extolling some aspect of Judaism or displaying images of Rabbi Schneerson and about Moshiach's imminent arrival. Some Mitzvah Tanks have external speakers attached which are used to play klezmer-style music. The tanks, usually manned by young male Lubavitch students in the Yeshiva of Tomchei Temimim, park in areas with heavy people-traffic and seek Jews to perform Mitzvahs by asking passers-by: "Are you Jewish?"

A contemporary variation began in 2026, when Hasidic journalist Shloime Zionce launched a planned 50-state outreach journey in a Jewish-themed Tesla Cybertruck stocked with tefillin and Shabbat candles.

== Purpose ==
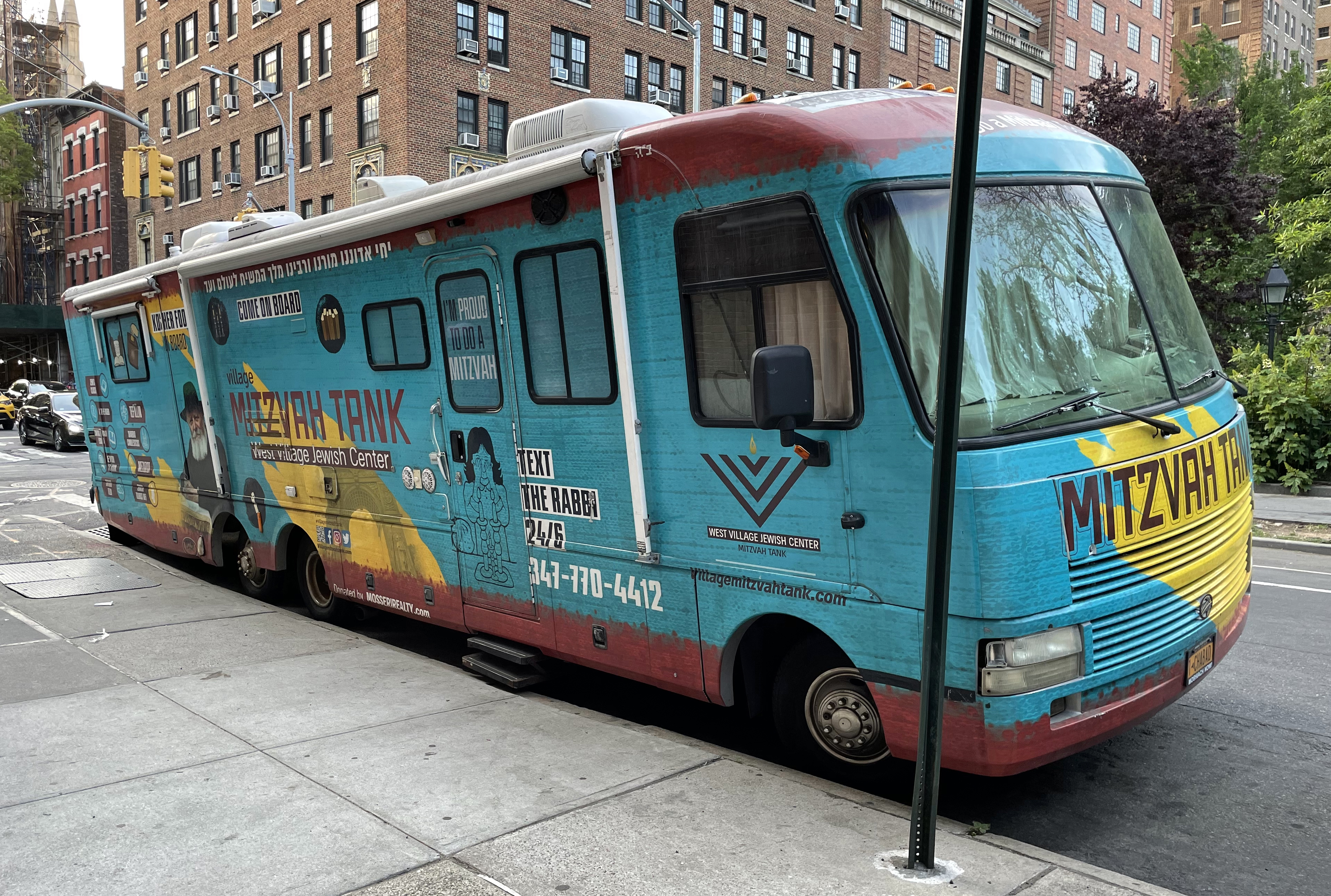
The Mitzvah Tank, Manhattan

Lubavitchers manning the tank will usually hand out brochures or cards with information about performing mitzvot and about the coming of Moshiach. They encourage passersby to perform mitzvot with an emphasis on those part of the Chabad mitzvah campaigns, and assist those who are willing to perform religious rituals, such as the putting on of Tefillin (phylacteries) with men and boys over Bar and bat mitzvah, and hand out candles and candle-lighting information to women and girls to light in honor of the Shabbat. In addition, during the holiday of Chanukah many Menorahs with candles are given out allowing people to bring the light of Chanukah into their own home, all in bringing the ultimate Moshiach closer. Some Mitzvah Tanks have traditional foods, like doughnuts, on board during that holiday as well.

== Australia ==
Around Pesach time in 2024, a few Rabbinic Chabad students in Melbourne, Australia founded the Mitzva tank office Melbourne. Every year, by Chanuka and Yud Aleph Nissan, the Lubavitcher Rebbe Melech Hamoshiach's birthday, they send out Mitzva tanks throughout Melbourne to spread Judaism. On Chanuka 2025, Sholom Shcreiber, Yosef Yitzchok Lipskier and Mendel Aron were officially appointed directors of the office. The office also runs weekly Dvar Malchus Shiurim and early morning "Hashkeim" events to learn the Rebbe's Sichos.

== See also ==
- Orthodox Judaism outreach
