= King of Crown Heights =

Documentary film about the Chabad-Lubavitch movement

King of Crown Heights is a 1992 American documentary film on the Chabad-Lubavitch Hasidic movement of Brooklyn, New York. The film was directed by Ruggero Gabbai. The film was aired by PBS.

== See also ==
- The Return: A Hasidic Experience
