= Outback Rabbis =

Australian documentary film about Chabad Hasidic rabbis

Outback Rabbis is a 2017 Australian documentary film on the Chabad Hasidic rabbis who seek out Jewish people living in regional and rural Australia. The documentary was directed by filmmaker Danny Ben-Moshe and aired on the SBS Australian television channel as part of its "Untold Australia" series in 2018.

The format of the film follows two rabbis and their wives who explain their mission and activities.

== See also ==
- The Rabbi Goes West
- Gut Shabbes Vietnam
