= Kathmandu (disambiguation) =

Kathmandu is the capital of and largest city in Nepal.

Kathmandu or Katmandu may also refer to:

== Places ==
- Kathmandu District, administrative division of Nepal that includes the city
- Kathmandu Valley, geographic division which includes the district

== Arts, entertainment and media ==
- Katmandu (band), a short-lived British blues supergroup
- "Katmandu" (song), by Bob Seger, 1975
- "Katmandu", a song by Cat Stevens from the 1970 album Mona Bone Jakon
- Katmandu (comics), a comic book by Carole Curtis
- Kathmandu (TV series), a 2012 Israeli miniseries

== Other uses ==
- Kathmandu, a brand of KMD Brands, formerly Kathmandu Holdings

== See also ==
- Catmando, a cat and joint leader of the Official Monster Raving Loony Party in the United Kingdom
- Katmundu, a 2015 Indian film
