= Michoel Muchnik =

American Jewish artist

Michoel Muchnik is an artist associated with the Chabad-Lubavitch Hasidic movement. Muchnik resides in Crown Heights, Brooklyn; his art is noted for its joyful, story book renderings of Jewish and Hasidic themes in water colors and acrylics, and for original lithographs.

== Personal life ==
Michoel Muchnik was born in Philadelphia in 1952. Muchnik received his artistic training at the Rhode Island School of Design. He later studied Jewish and Talmudic studies at the Rabbinical College of America in Morristown, New Jersey.

== Art ==
Michoel Muchnik's art focuses on imaginative and joyful depictions of traditional and mystical Jewish and Hasidic themes. Muchnik has exhibited his work and lectured on Hasidic art throughout the United States as well as abroad. In 1977, Muchnik was selected alongside four other Hasidic artists, including Hendel Lieberman, to be featured at a special Hasidic art exhibition at the Brooklyn Museum. Muchnik has written and illustrated a number of children's books and illustrated a collector's edition of Pirke Avot (Ethics of the Fathers), published by Behrman House in 1986. Muchnik has painted scenes of the Mitzvah Campaigns, a particular, unique set of images associated with Chabad's outreach activities.

=== The Creative Soul ===
Muchnik has joined "The Creative Soul," a network of Chabad Chasidic artists founded by artist and shaliach Yitzchok Moully.

== See also ==
- Hendel Lieberman
- Yitzchok Moully
