= Kathmandu (TV series) =

2012 television series by Yair Raveh and Esther Vander

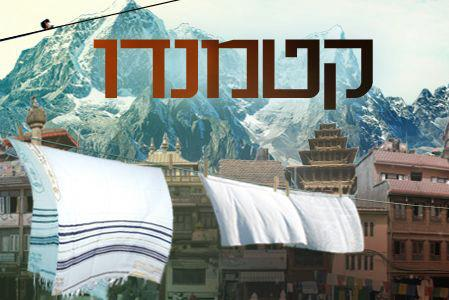
Kathmandu (TV series)

Kathmandu is a 2012 Israeli television miniseries depicting the lives of a Chabad Hasidic Jewish family living in Kathmandu, Nepal. The 13-episode series was produced by the Israeli company Reshet.

The main characters of the series, "Shmulik" (Michael Moshonov) and "Mushkie" (Nitzan Levartovsky), are based on the lives of Rabbi Chezki Lifshitz and Rebbetzin Chani Lifshitz who are the Chabad emissaries in Nepal.

== See also ==
- Gut Shabbes Vietnam
- Judaism in Nepal
