= Hendel Lieberman =

American artist

Chenoch Hendel Lieberman (29 March 1900 OS – 15 March 1976), born Chenoch Hendel Futerfas, was an Orthodox Jewish Russian-born, Chabad hasidic American artist. He was the brother of the famed Mashpia Rabbi Menachem Mendel Futerfas. Lieberman was known in the Chabad community as Feter Hendel ("Uncle Hendel").

== Biography ==
Hendel was born in Plyeshchanitsy, Belarus (then part of the Russian Empire) as Chenoch Hendel Futerfas. In 1925 he married Breina Freidman, with whom he had two daughters. Breina and the two girls were killed by a Nazi Einsatzgruppe in 1941, in Brahin, Belarus, while Hendel was serving in the Red Army.

In 1946, Hendel left the USSR using forged Polish papers; afraid that the KGB would track him down, he changed his surname to Lieberman. After short stays in Paris and London, in 1951 he settled in Brooklyn, New York, where he became a devoted Hasid, follower of Rabbi Menachem Mendel Schneerson, the seventh Lubavitcher Rebbe.

== Art ==
Hendel Lieberman's art is noted for its depiction of Jewish and Hasidic life and customs. His paintings hang in a number of museums including the New York Metropolitan Museum of Art, London's Tate Gallery, and museums in Paris.

== Legacy ==
The Chabad rock band Feter Hendel ("Uncle Hendel") is named after Hendel Lieberman.

== See also ==
- Michoel Muchnik
- Yitzchok Moully
