= Project 2x1 =

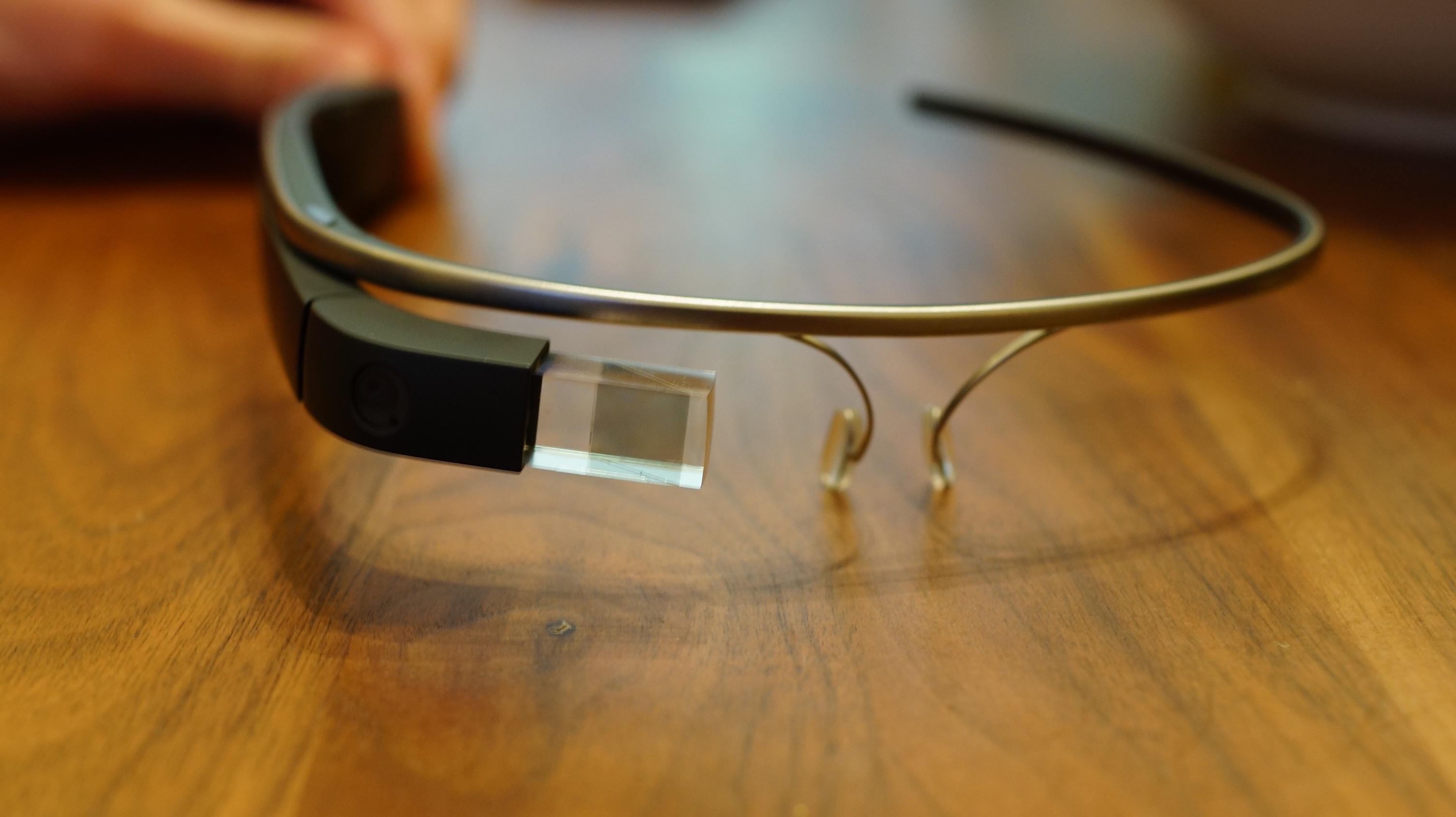
- Directed by: Hannah Roodman
- Produced by: Hannah Roodman, Ben Millstein, Celso White, Mendy Seldowitz
- Cinematography: Ian Moubayad and Ben Millstein
- Edited by: Emmett Adler
- Release dates: December 8, 2013; December 13, 2013 (Brooklyn Film & Arts Festival)
- Running time: 30 minutes
- Country: United States
- Language: English
- Budget: $6000 USD

Project 2x1 is a 2013 American documentary film about the Hasidic and West Indian residents of Crown Heights, Brooklyn. It is shot in part using Google Glass. Project 2x1 is directed by Hannah Roodman, and produced by Lisa Campbell and Jaqueline Ratner Stauber. The film is produced by a diverse group of Crown Heights residents; the Project 2×1 film project was initially founded by Mendy Seldowitz, Hannah Roodman, Celso White and Ben Millstein.

The use of Google Glass in the production of Project 2x1 allowed the film to harness the medium's storytelling capacities. The two distinctive cultural communities inhabiting the Crown Heights neighborhood (Hasidic and West Indian) and are each represented by the perspectives of community members. Both differences and similarities between the two communities are presented to the viewer, who is tasked with assuming multiple perspectives regarding culture, communal issues, and civic engagement.

== Film ==
Project 2x1 is styled as a documentary film covering the daily lives of the Chabad Hasidic and West Indian residents of Crown Heights, Brooklyn. Both cultural as well as religious events are captured in the film. Footage is shot, in part, using Google Glass. The film project is named "2x1" after the two mile by one mile radius of the Crown Heights neighbourhood.

The film focuses primarily on the iconic Hasidic and Caribbean residents, to the exclusion of other demographic groups living in the area.

Aside from the film "documenting [a] day within the neighborhood", the film examines "the way interpersonal relationships form between members of divergent communities all living within blocks of each other." The makers of the film have stated that their aim and stated goal is to promote tolerance and understanding between the Caribbean and Hasidic residents, by releasing a documentary of the day-to-day lives of Crown Heights locals from their respective communities.

== Use of Google Glass ==
The film is shot in part using Google Glass, a pair of glasses frames with video capturing film in a kind of "first-person point of view". The film is cut from scenes shot by residents themselves. The scenes are collected by filmmakers who "[walk] around the neighborhood of Crown Heights, giving Google Glass to people to record what they see."

The Google Glass concept for use in the film was conceived by project co-founder Mendy Seldowitz who was chosen as a "Google Glass Explorer". Google Glass is not available to the general public, instead, there are 10,000 "Google Glass Explorers" who received the device for initial use. Prior to the film project, Seldowitz had experimented filming local scenes in Crown Heights using his pair of Google Glass. Seldowitz cited the advantage of using Glass as it "removes the influence of the filmmaker".

The Crown Heights documentary claims to be the first ever to be shot with Google Glass. However, the documentary is not filmed exclusively on Google Glass; some scenes were filmed with DSLR videography in an interview format.

The battery life on Google Glass was a "major issue" for the filmmakers, forcing them to shoot for short periods before recharging Glass.

== Screening ==
The film was initially screened in Crown Heights, on December 8, 2013. The Brooklyn Historical Society and Brooklyn Film & Arts Festival partnered in a later screening the film, on December 13, 2013.

== See also ==
- Chabad in film and television
