= Blacks and Jews (film) =

1997 documentary film

- Directed by: Deborah Kaufman, Alan Snitow
- Written by: Deborah Kaufman, Alan Snitow
- Produced by: Deborah Kaufman, Bari Scott, Alan Snitow
- Cinematography: Ashley James
- Edited by: Veronica Selver
- Music by: David Slusser
- Release date: 1997
- Running time: 85 min.
- Language: English

Blacks and Jews is a 1997 documentary film that examines the relationships and conflicts between Black and Jewish activists, from the 1991 Crown Heights Riot to Steven Spielberg's controversial visit to the predominantly Black Castlemont High School after some students laughed during a screening of Schindler's List.

The film focused on incidents such as the 1960s blockbusting of the then-largely Jewish Lawndale neighborhood on the West Side of Chicago and a rabbi's efforts to maintain stability in the community and of a Hasidic father and son who were protected by a Black journalist during the 1991 riots in Brooklyn that took place in the wake of the death of Gavin Cato by a Hasidic driver.

Blacks and Jews was directed by Deborah Kaufman and Alan Snitow. The 90-minute film was aired as part of PBS's Point of View series.

The film was shown as part of the 1997 Sundance Film Festival in Park City, Utah.

== See also ==
- Chabad in film and television
- Fires in the Mirror
- The Secret Relationship Between Blacks and Jews
