= Niezhin (Hasidic dynasty) =

Branch of the Chabad movement

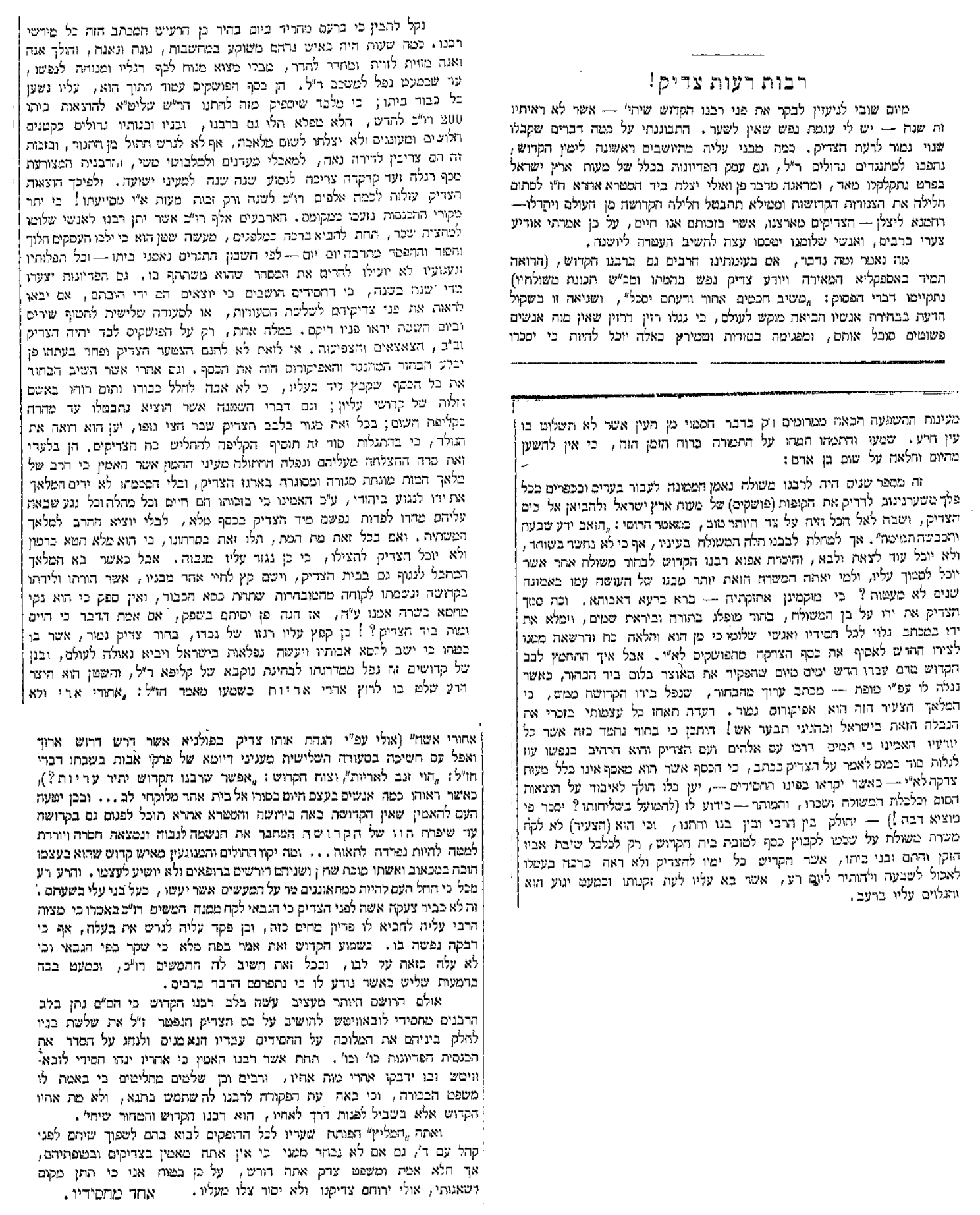
Niezhin (Chabad) Letter in HaMelitz 23 Feb 1883 pp.3-4

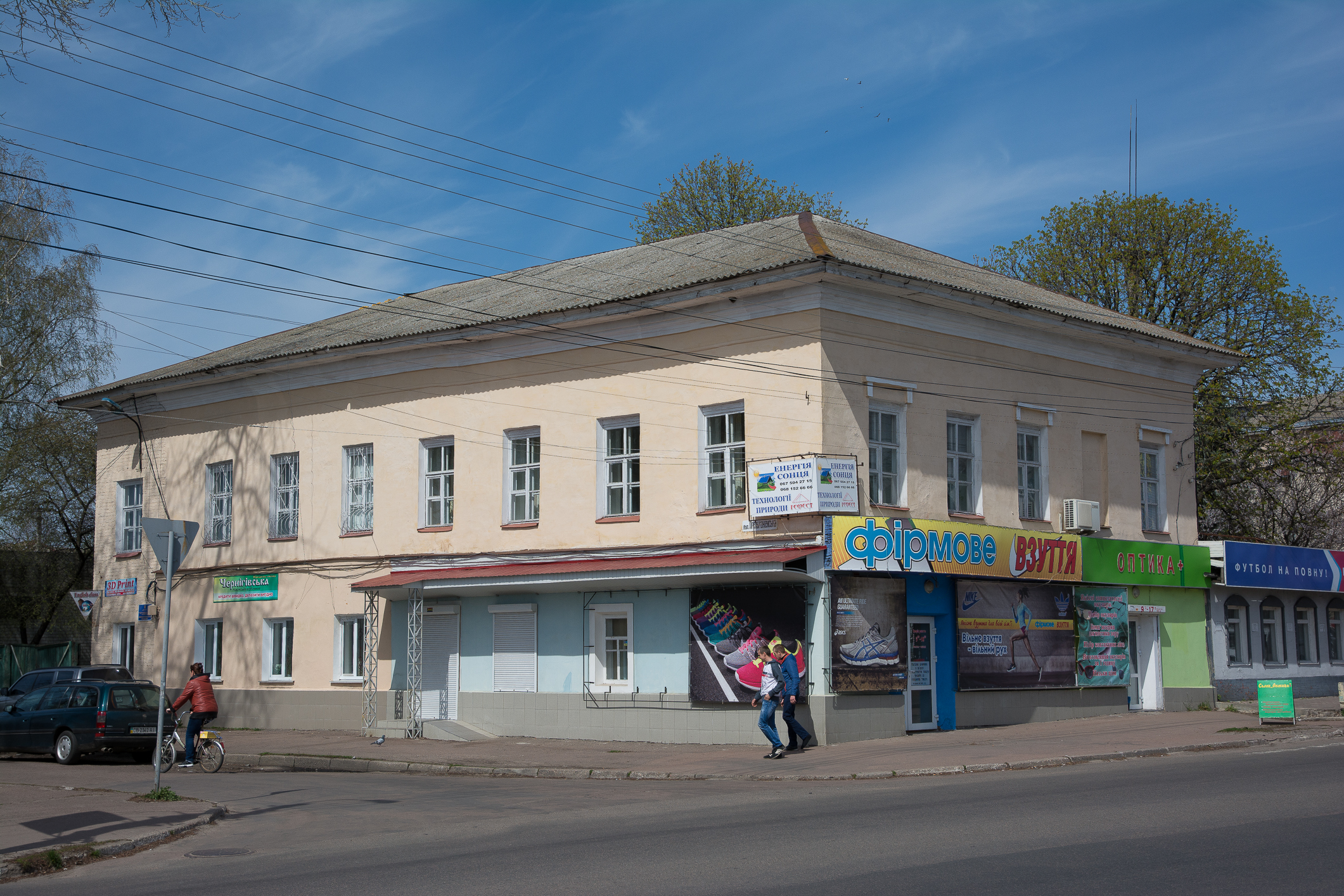
The Schneerson Synagogue of the Niezhin Hasidim

The Niezhin branch of the Chabad Hasidic movement was founded after the death of the third rebbe of Chabad, Rabbi Menachem Mendel Schneersohn. The group was one of several that sought to succeed Rabbi Menachem Mendel, whose death created a dispute over his succession. The group was led by its founder, Rabbi Yisroel Noach of Niezhin, a son of Rabbi Menachem Mendel.

== A branch of Chabad ==
After the death of Rabbi Menachem Mendel Schneersohn, several of his sons independently assumed the role of rebbe. Rabbi Yisroel Noach of Niezhin assumed the role of rebbe in the town of Nizhyn, the same town his grandfather, Rabbi Dovber Schneuri (the second rebbe of Chabad-Lubavitch), was buried. He died without a successor, thus ending the Niezhin dynasty. His son was Rabbi Avraham Schneerson of Kischinev, whose daughter, Nechama Dina Schneersohn, married Rabbi Yosef Yitzchok Schneersohn, the sixth Rebbe of Chabad-Lubavitch.
