= Yitzchok Moully =

Australian-American Jewish artist and rabbi

Yitzchok Moully (born 1979) is an Australian-American Orthodox rabbi and artist associated with the Chabad-Lubavitch Hasidic movement, and is known for his "Chasidic Pop Art" painting style. Moully served as a Chabad emissary (shaliach) in Basking Ridge, New Jersey.

Moully's combination of rabbinic work and art is expressed in a piece "Orange Socks." The piece, according to Moully, contrasts what people think of as a homogeneous Chassidic experience.

== Personal life ==
Yitzchok Moully was born in Queensland, Australia, but moved to Melbourne, Victoria, at the age of three. At the age of five, Moully and his mother moved to Crown Heights, Brooklyn and joined the Chabad community there. Moully later studied at Chabad yeshivoth, married, and became the assistant rabbi at the Chabad Jewish Center of Basking Ridge, New Jersey.

== Art ==
Moully has produced works by using the silkscreen process; his art contrasts strong Jewish and Chasidic images with vibrant bold colors creating what he describes as "Chassidic Pop Art." Moully uses color and styles similar to the work of Andy Warhol, using popular images from Jewish Chasidic culture including dreidels, Kiddush cups and praying rabbis. Moully also works in abstract art, and has been heavily influenced by artists such as by the French Canadian artist Jean Pierre Lafrance

In 2006, Moully began exhibiting his art in galleries and community centers in New Jersey, New York, and Pennsylvania. His work has been on exhibit at the gallery ArtisZen Arts in Lambertville, New Jersey. In the summer of 2022, he was the art teacher of ckids gan Israel camp

He also started a podcast called orange socks

== The Creative Soul ==
Moully founded a network of Orthodox Jewish artists called "The Creative Soul." The group has sought to bring together local Chasidic artists, responding to the community's need for a greater focus on creativity. The Creative Soul has organized an annual exhibition in Crown Heights during the Jewish holiday of Sukkot. The exhibition has included submissions from local Chabad artists including Yitzchok Moully and Michoel Muchnik

== See also ==
- Hendel Lieberman
- Michoel Muchnik
