= Tevel B'Tzedek =

Israeli non-governmental organization

Tevel b’Tzedek (in Hebrew: תבל בצדק) is a non-governmental organization (NGO) based in Israel that promotes sustainable development in developing countries through the formation of thematic-based groups and community mobilization. It was established in 2007 by Rabbi Micha Odenheimer, who wanted to provide young Jewish people with meaningful social justice experience abroad with the intention of creating strong Jewish leaders invested in the idea of Tikkun Olam (repairing the world). Since 2007, hundreds of Jewish volunteers from communities in Israel, the United States, Germany, Ukraine, South Africa, Australia and other countries have traveled to Nepal and Haiti to participate in community development projects.

== History ==
Tevel was formed in 2007 and began with 15 Israeli volunteers living communally in the Swayambhu neighborhood of Kathmandu and volunteering with local NGOs. In 2009 Tevel partnered with Nyayik Sansar to establish a unified organizational model that places highly qualified professional Nepali staff as leaders of projects in various communities working alongside international volunteers. Volunteers are recruited from Jewish communities in various parts of the world to live and work as part of the communities they are helping to develop.

== Mission ==
Tevel b'Tzedek has two synergetic, equally important goals. They strive to create Israeli and Jewish leadership involved in "Tikkun Olam" (repairing the world) locally and globally. Additionally, they aim to work together with impoverished communities to enhance their livelihood, capacity and wellbeing.

== Methodology ==
=== Community development ===
Tevel/ Nyayik Sansar's community development model emphasizes sustainable development and long lasting socio-economic changes in five main thematic areas: Women, Youth, Agriculture, Education and Media. The duration of Tevel volunteers’ stay varies by program including a one-month, four-month or ten-month service learning program. The ten month fellowship program pairs international volunteers with Nepali volunteers both of whom have educational or vocational background in related areas.

=== Agriculture ===
Tevel establishes community demonstration farms in remote villages to teach new growing techniques and water conservation methods. Twenty-five demonstration farms are now maintained by local group members with the aim of developing a more communal approach to food security in the villages. Tevel's agriculture groups have helped villagers build better water and rain-harvesting collection methods, drip irrigation systems and off-season vegetable nurseries. Since the earthquake in Nepal, 500 female farmers have received over 4,000 kilos of ginger roots and training to create commercial cooperatives in their villages, 100 rural entrepreneurs in small scale mushroom farming are being supported and trained, and 1,300,000 square feet of land has been irrigated with concrete irrigation pools.

=== Education ===
Tevel works with over 20 public schools serving students from ages three and above. Tevel focuses on establishing early childhood development classes and training teachers in child-friendly, child-centered teaching methodologies. Tevel aims to bridge educational theory and policy with practical implementation in schools with very limited resources. Tevel's education groups have trained teachers in child-centered pedagogy and project-based education and have formed programs to increase attendance and enrollment. Since the earthquake, Tevel has also brought in trauma experts to teach village teachers how to help their students cope with the loss of family members and their homes.

=== Youth empowerment ===
Tevel establishes community- and school-based youth groups that focus on increasing leadership skills for village youth. In Nepal, the movement is known as “Hami Yuva” (We are the Youth). Four months after the earthquake, Tevel started a groundbreaking Youth Service Program in Nepal where 40 village youths are learning to become agents of change in their devastated communities. The program, run in partnership with the American Jewish Joint Distribution Committee (JDC), focuses on giving the participants tools and skills to implement community recovery programs and how to continue the economic development of the villages in the future.

=== Women’s groups ===
Tevel's groups give women the opportunity to discuss and try to solve community-based problems that specifically affect women such as domestic violence and parenting as well as empower women economically through income-generation projects such as ginger-growing cooperatives. Tevel's women's program also provides training and support to village female community health volunteers. In April 2016, over 500 women were scanned and treated for uterine prolapse in Nepal in partnership with Manmohan Memorial Hospital.

=== Media ===
Tevel aims to help community members living in rural, remote areas to utilize media and technology available to them, such as mobile phones to improve their access to information and education. Tevel's media group have worked with community-based groups to develop journalist clubs for youth and computer trainings for teachers.

== Geographic locations ==
=== Africa ===
==== Burundi ====
Tevel began working in Burundi in 2014 in Makamba, Burundi's southernmost province, which has seen an influx of returnees over the past years. Tevel works in the rural Vugizo district, an area which suffers from a complete lack of infrastructure needed to advance development activity. The main projects in Vugizo include 2 community farms, teacher's training and income generation programs for village women.

=== America ===
==== Haiti ====
One month after a powerful earthquake devastated the nation of Haiti on January 12, 2010, in which more than 100,000 people were killed, and over another million were left homeless, the joint IsraAid and Tevel delegation began its work in the Republic of Haiti, providing immediate psycho-social humanitarian aid, education and community empowerment in three displaced persons’ camps in Port-au-Prince. Tevel's efforts in Haiti were fully supported and funded by IsraAid, the Israeli forum for international humanitarian aid. Tevel finished its participation in the Haiti project in 2014.

=== Asia ===
==== Israel ====
Tevel runs programs in Israel through which Tevel alumni address key social issues in Israeli society related to the global context. Projects include: promoting labor rights for Nepali, other foreign workers and disadvantaged Israelis in Israel, developing environmentally-friendly communities and educating the consumer market about fair trade and the supply chain.

==== Nepal ====
Tevel and its local partner Nyayik Sansar employ over 60 Nepalese staff members who work with Jewish volunteers in eleven communities in 5 districts in Nepal: Ramechhap, Dhading, Dholaka, Kavre and Kathmandu serving over 25,000 underprivileged and marginalized villagers. Tevel works on building agricultural capacity, strengthening the existing community structures, and giving the communities tools to adapt to the challenges of globalization and climate change.

All of the communities that Tevel works in now or worked in during previous intervention cycles, are in areas that were hardest hit by the April 2015 earthquake. To meet post earthquake needs, in 2015 Tevel distributed 4,245 temporary housing support packages, food support to needy families and also expanded income generation projects in the community.

Nyayik Sansar is a Nepalese non-governmental, non-profit organization established in 2009 with the belief that working together can strengthen and improve the most disadvantaged and socially marginalized communities.

The organization is registered in Kathmandu and is affiliated with the social welfare council. Since its inception, Nyayik Sansar has worked in partnership with the Israeli non-governmental organization Tevel B'Tzedek.

Nyayik Sansar works towards a just society, where people are empowered; socially, economically, politically, culturally and legally. The organization emphasizes a holistic approach to community development and therefore focuses on all the major problems and challenges faced by the communities where the NGO works. Nyayik Sansar's programmes focus on skills development training, capacity development training, teamwork, awareness raising, sensitization and behaviour change. The main beneficiaries of the NGO are marginalized ethnic communities and the most disadvantaged caste groups.

Its mission is to seek a peaceful, inclusive and harmonious society, full of opportunities in which all people are treated equally, regardless of caste, gender or social and economic status, and can live their lives with dignity. Empower farmers, women, youth and children in disadvantaged communities to ensure social justice, through increased opportunities and a sense of belonging and commitment to their respective communities. Its objective is to create an enabling environment where socially excluded communities can enjoy their rights.

The NGO has intervened directly in rural communities and slums of the city for a period of 3–5 years. During this time the staff lived in the community 24 hours a day, 7 days a week, and developed strong bonds with the community.

Initially, the organization's staff led women's and youth groups, as well as community projects such as biogas sanitation. However, as soon as the groups were well established, members of the organization began to train members of the local community to lead the activity. In this way, the development of the activity can be carried out by the local community leaders when the staff of the foreign NGO leaves the country after the period of direct intervention, although the foreign staff will continue to supervise the local NGO for some years.

Agricultural intervention is based on the same idea. At first, the agricultural experts conducted the training sessions on a demonstration farm that they opened in the areas where they were located. After introducing the basic concepts and methods, the NGO experts advised the farmers to implement the agricultural techniques in their own rural communities.

== Completed projects ==
Mahdav Besi – Tevel began working in Mahdav Besi, Dhading District, Nepal in 2009. According to Tevel founder Micha Oddenheimer, "Our intervention with the Danuwar Rai in Mahadev Besi has been an amazing success. It's mind-boggling to look at the village today and remember what it was like four years ago. Our first youth leaders are now in college, there are women from our women's group in local government, villagers are using toilets and cooking with biogas and most important PEOPLE HAVE ENOUGH TO EAT. Our challenge now is to take the Mahadev Besi model and scale it up to benefit other communities in Nepal and around the globe."

== See also ==
- IsraAid
