= Zvi Yair =

Hungarian-American Orthodox Rabbi

Zvi Yair (Hebrew: צבי יאיר) is the pen-name of the Jewish poet and Chassidic scholar Rabbi Zvi Meir Steinmetz (Hebrew: צבי מאיר שטיינמץ; 20 March 1915 – 16 September 2005). Zvi Yair wrote poetry in Hebrew.

== Early life ==
His father Shlomo Dov Steinmetz lived in the village of Brister in the Carpathian Mountains, on the border of Galicia, but Zvi Yair was born in Budapest (1915), where the family was living temporarily because of the upheavals caused by the First World War.

== Career ==
In 1940 he married Devorah Isenberg and was hiding in Budapest during World War II thanks to a family friend, Eleonóra Sipos, which he later awarded a tree in the Yad Vashem museum.

After the war he lived in Vienna, Austria, till 1952 when he migrated to New York. He began as a teacher in a Yeshiva University affiliated high school and then entered the real estate business as a mortgage broker and small investor.

== Works ==
He published his first book, "Gesharim" [Bridges], (Herskovitz Miklós, Debrecen, Hungary) under the name Ben Shlomo [the son of Shlomo] in 1942 during World War II. In 1951, he published in Vienna "Netiv" [Path]. He moved to New York and published a booklet in Israel in 1968 "Al Hachof" [On the Beach]. In 1973 he published "Merosh Zurim" (Eked, Tel Aviv), in 1981 "Miknaf Haaretz" (Eked, Tel Aviv) and in 1997 "Bechevion Hanefesh" (Heichal Menachem, Jerusalem).
