= Avrutch (Hasidic dynasty) =

Branch of the Chabad movement

The Avrutch branch of the Chernobyl Hasidic movement was founded by Rabbi Yosef Yitzchak of Avrutch (1822–1876) a son of Rabbi Menachem Mendel, who assumed the role of rebbe in the town of Ovruch, Ukraine, at the urging of his father-in-law, Rabbi Yisroel Yaakov Twersky, the Rebbe of Hornosteipel-Cherkkass. During the lifetime of his father, the third Rebbe of Chabad, Rabbi Menachem Mendel Schneersohn. The group was not one of several that sought to succeed Rabbi Menachem Mendel, whose death created a dispute over his succession, as it was conducted in the style of the Chernobyl dynasty and did not attract adherents of Chabad methodology. The Avrutch Rebbe's daughter, Shterna Sara Schneersohn, married her cousin, the fifth Chabad Rebbe, Sholom Dovber Schneersohn; through whom the Avrutch Rebbe became the maternal grandfather of the sixth Chabad Rebbe, Yosef Yitzchak Schneersohn.
