= The Return: A Hasidic Experience =

Documentary film on the Chabad-Lubavitch movement

The Return: A Hasidic Experience is a 1979 American documentary film on the Chabad-Lubavitch Hasidic movement and the American Jews who become Hasidic. The film was entered in the 1981 American Film Festival where it was a awards finalist. The film was directed by Barry Ralbag and Yisrael Lifshutz. The film's narrator was Isaac Bashevis Singer.

== Awards ==
- American Film Festival Red Ribbon Lifestyle Award (1981)

== See also ==
- A Life Apart: Hasidism in America (1997)
- Chabad in film and television
