= Gut Shabbes Vietnam =

Documentary film

Gut Shabbes Vietnam (Hebrew: גוט שאבעס וייטנאם) is a 2008 documentary on a Chabad Hasidic family living in Vietnam. The film was written and directed by Ido and Yael Zand, and aired on Israeli television.

The film follows Rabbi Menachem Hartman of Chabad of Vietnam as he assists Jews travelling to Southeast Asia with religious services.

== See also ==
- Chabad in film and television
