= Chabad mitzvah campaigns =

Chabad mitzvah campaign

Chabad mitzvah campaigns, or Mivtzo'im (Hebrew: מבצעים) refer to several campaigns launched by the Lubavitcher Rebbe, Menachem Mendel Schneerson. From 1967 to 1976, Schneerson said all Jews should observe ten basic "beginner's mitzvot" (commandments) . In the years that followed there were campaigns for additional mitzvot as well.

== The ten campaigns ==
- Tefillin: Men (age 13 and up) are encouraged to wear the tefillin every morning excluding Shabbat (the sabbath, from late Friday afternoon to early Saturday evening) and festivals. Started in 1967.
- Shabbat Candles: Women and girls (age 3 and up) are encouraged to light candles 18 minutes before sunset on Friday afternoon to start the sabbath, and also to start festivals.
- Mezuzah: Says that every Jewish home should have a mezuzah on its doorposts. Started in the year 1974.
- Torah Study: Says to study a portion of Torah daily.
- Tzedakah (Charity): Says to give charity daily.
- Holy Books: Encouraged furnishing homes with as many holy books as possible. At a minimum, a Chumash (Judaism) (Torah with Haftarahs), the Psalms, and a Prayer Book.
- Kosher dietary laws: Says to eat only kosher foods. Launched in 1975.
- Love Your Fellow: Says that Rabbi Akiva's injunction to "Love your fellow as yourself" should be applied by Jews to fellow Jews and that this is among the greatest commandments a Jew can fulfill.
- Education: Says that every Jewish child should receive a Jewish education.
- Family Purity: Encourages observance of Jewish menstrual laws.

== Seasonal campaigns ==
Additionally, Schneerson called for numerous other campaigns, some related to holidays:

- the Shofar campaign, that all Jews to hear the Shofar on Rosh Hashanah;
- the Four Species campaign, that all Jews to perform this Mitzvah on Sukkot;
- the Hanukkah campaign, to encourage Jews to light the Hanukkah Menorah, started in 1973 when 60,000 menorahs were given out. As of 2024 more than 700,000 were distributed around the world; this campaign also promotes erecting and lighting large public Menorahs, and as of 2024 there were more than 15,000 public Menorah lightings.
- the Purim campaign, to encourage Jews to fulfil the commandments of Purim;
- the campaign encouraging all Jews to use Shmurah Matza for the night of the Passover Seder;
- the Lag Ba'Omer campaign, to organize Lag Ba'Omer parades for Jewish children;
- the campaign encouraging all Jewish children to hear the ten commandments on Shavuot;
- the campaign for all Jews to study Torah on topics related to the Bet HaMikdash during the Three Weeks of mourning before Tisha b'Av.

== Other year round campaigns ==
Others campaigns applied all year round:

- the campaign for all Jews to study Chasidic philosophy;
- the campaign for all Jews to recite before morning prayer the phrase, "I hereby take upon myself to fulfill the positive [Mitzvah], 'Love your fellow as yourself,'" and after prayer to recite the verse, "Indeed, the righteous will extol Your Name; the upright will dwell in Your presence."
- the campaigns in support of large families;
- the campaign for a Moment of silence in public schools;
- the campaign that every Jew (including and especially children) "purchase" a letter to be inscribed in a Torah scroll;
- the campaign for all Jews to celebrate their Jewish birthdays with a festive gathering, and to undertake to increase in Torah, prayer, and good deeds in the coming year;
- the campaign for all Jews to study Torah on topics related to belief in the Moshiach and the Jewish redemption; and many more.
- the campaign calling on every Jew to reach out to non-Jews to teach and encourage them to adopt the Noahide laws.

== History of Mitzvah Campaigns ==
Schneerson encapsulated his outreach activity in the slogan of "Uforatzto" (Heb. ופרצת) "you shall spread out." The origin of this phrase is in God's words to Ya'akov, "You shall spread out to the west, to the east, to the north, and to the south." Schneerson would use it in a borrowed sense to refer to the global scale of the outreach activities that he was calling for.

Schneerson's general outreach activity began already in the early years of leadership, but was accelerated with the call for encouraging these specific practices.

=== Tefillin campaign ===
The first Mitzvah Campaign was the Tefillin campaign, an international campaign by Chabad Hasidim to influence all male Jews, regardless of their level of religious observance, to fulfill the mitzvah of Tefillin (phylacteries) daily. Schneerson announced this campaign two days before the outbreak of the Six-Day War, on June 3, 1967. After the victory of the Six Day War and the seizure of the Western Wall, Schneerson intensified this call, and his Hasidim gave hundreds of thousands of Jews the opportunity to don tefillin, many for the first time.

The campaign received some opposition at first. Over the course of that summer, some torah observant Jews raised halakhic questions about the propriety of the campaign. In the fall, Schneerson publicly addressed these issues at the farbrengen of parashat bereshit that year, later published in the rabbi's books of Likkutei Sichos. Shortly afterward, the yearly conference of the heads of the World Agudath Israel took place, at which one of the speakers publicly criticized Schneerson and the tefillin campaign. Schneerson responded to this criticism at the farbrengen of parashat toledot that year.

On one occasion Schneerson gave two reasons for his particular choice of campaign, saying, "The first reason is that there is a passage in the Talmudic tractate of Rosh Hashanah which says that once a Jew wears Tefillin on his head—even one time in his life—he falls into a different category as a Jew." Secondly, "When a Jew in Miami sees pictures of Jews at the Western Wall wearing Tefillin, he gets an urge to put on Tefillin himself."

=== Torah Study campaign ===
- the Torah campaign, that all Jews: men, women, and children, engage in regular Torah study. Of this Schneerson said:

One should strive as much as possible, and more, to influence every single Jew, regardless of his location or circumstances, to designate a set time for Torah study. When one encounters a Jew in the street, one should ask him if he has already set a time for Torah study. If he has, one should influence him to increase further—ideally, by influencing him to become a teacher himself.

=== Method ===
Schneerson would refer to these outreach activities as "the ten Mitzvah Campaigns." He emphasised their importance, saying:

In practical terms, each Jew must proceed in Torah and Mitzvos, the channels for his growth being the Ten Mivtzoim, beginning with oneself, and then spreading forth Torah and Jewishness to the fullest extent of his influence ... As stated on the cover page of “Tanya” — “this service is not far removed from you, in the heavens or across the sea, but rather close to you and within your potential, with your mouth and heart, and able to be accomplished in deed”. And as our Sages emphasized, “deed is the most essential.”

Furthermore, he stressed a joyful approach to outreach:

The Mivtzoim should be spread with joy. Just as we fulfill the Mitzvos with joy, so too, must we try to share that joy with others... However, we realize that “serve God with joy,” is a fundamental Torah principle. All our efforts in the Miztzoim must be carried out with joy. This joy, in turn will bring greater success to the Mivtzoim. Our inner joy will light up our faces, and light up our approach toward another Jew. And then, the joy will break down barriers, including the barriers of the person whom we are trying to influence. The happiness will bring us to a complete unity, without any separations.

He also stressed warmth and friendliness:

When he starts to speak with another Jew he might think that the way to bring him to complete fulfillment of the Mitzvos is to show him a sour face, and to let him know that he is unhappy to have to deal with him. We must realize that such actions are contrary to the relations that must exist between one Jew and another. “Love your neighbor as yourself” is a fundamental principle of Torah, as the Talmud declares: “the fulfillment of this Mitzvah is the entire Torah and the others are merely an explanation.”

He taught that the Jewish education and love your fellow Jew campaigns are all-encompassing campaigns, of which all the other campaigns are a subset.
