= Chabad offshoot groups =

Religious groups spawned from the Chabad-Lubavitch Hasidic Jewish movement

Chabad offshoot groups are those spawned from the Chabad Hasidic Jewish movement. Many of these groups were founded to succeed previous Chabad leaders, acting as rivals to some of the dynastic rebbes of Chabad. Others were founded by former students of the movement, who, in forming their own groups, drew upon their experiences at Chabad.

Since the founding of Chabad in 1775, the movement has had seven leaders, or rebbes. There were at least eleven leaders of the offshoot groups, who were either relatives or students of the Chabad rebbes.

== Major offshoots ==
The major groups to have split from the Chabad movement, forming their own Chabad-styled Chasidic groups, often positioned themselves as legitimate successors of previous Chabad leaders. Major offshoot groups of the Chabad movement include:

=== Strashelye ===
Strashelye was founded after the death of Rabbi Shneur Zalman of Liadi, founder of the Chabad movement. The Strashelye branch was formed as the result of a dispute over Rabbi Shneur Zalman's succession. The group also advocated an alternate approach to Chabad thought, rivaling both the leadership as well as the teachings of Rabbi Dovber Schneuri, the second rebbe of Chabad, and Rabbi Shneur Zalman's son. Though the group was founded by a former student of Chabad, it is commonly referred to as "Strashelye" after the town in the Mohilev Province of present-day Belarus where its leaders lived. The Strashelye group had two rebbes:

- Rabbi Aaron ha-Levi ben Moses of Staroselye (1766−1828), the founder of the group. Rabbi Aaron was a student of Rabbi Shneur Zalman of Liadi, and a friend of Dovber Shneuri. The main theological issues dividing Rabbi Aaron and Rabbi Dovber were their differing attitudes and approaches to mystical concepts explained in Hasidic thought and Chabad philosophy.
- Rabbi Haim Raphael ha-Levi ben Aaron of Staroselye (d. 1842), son of Rabbi Aaron. Rabbi Haim Raphael was the second and last rebbe of the Strashelye group.

=== Kopust (Kopys') ===
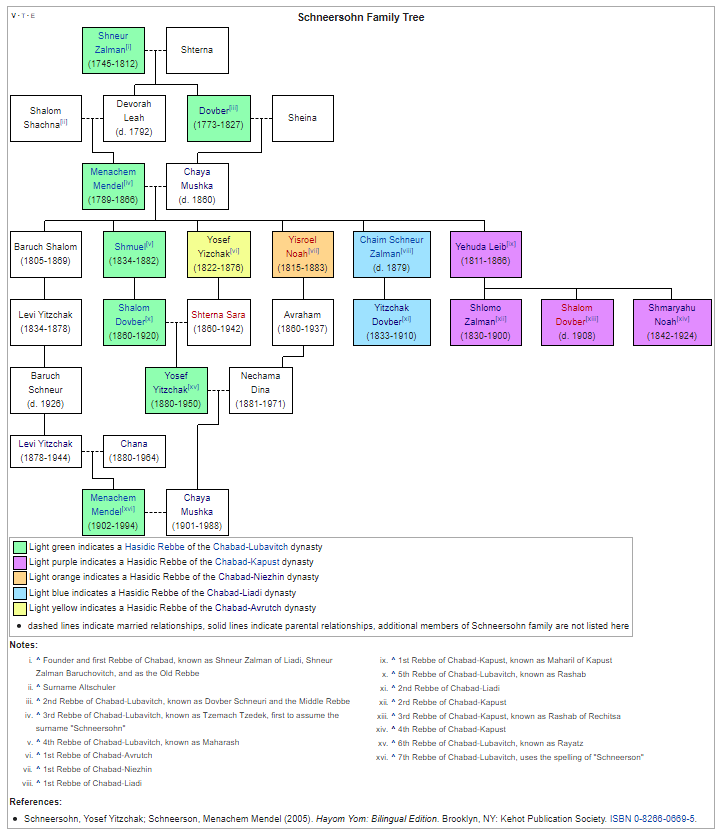
Schneersohn Family

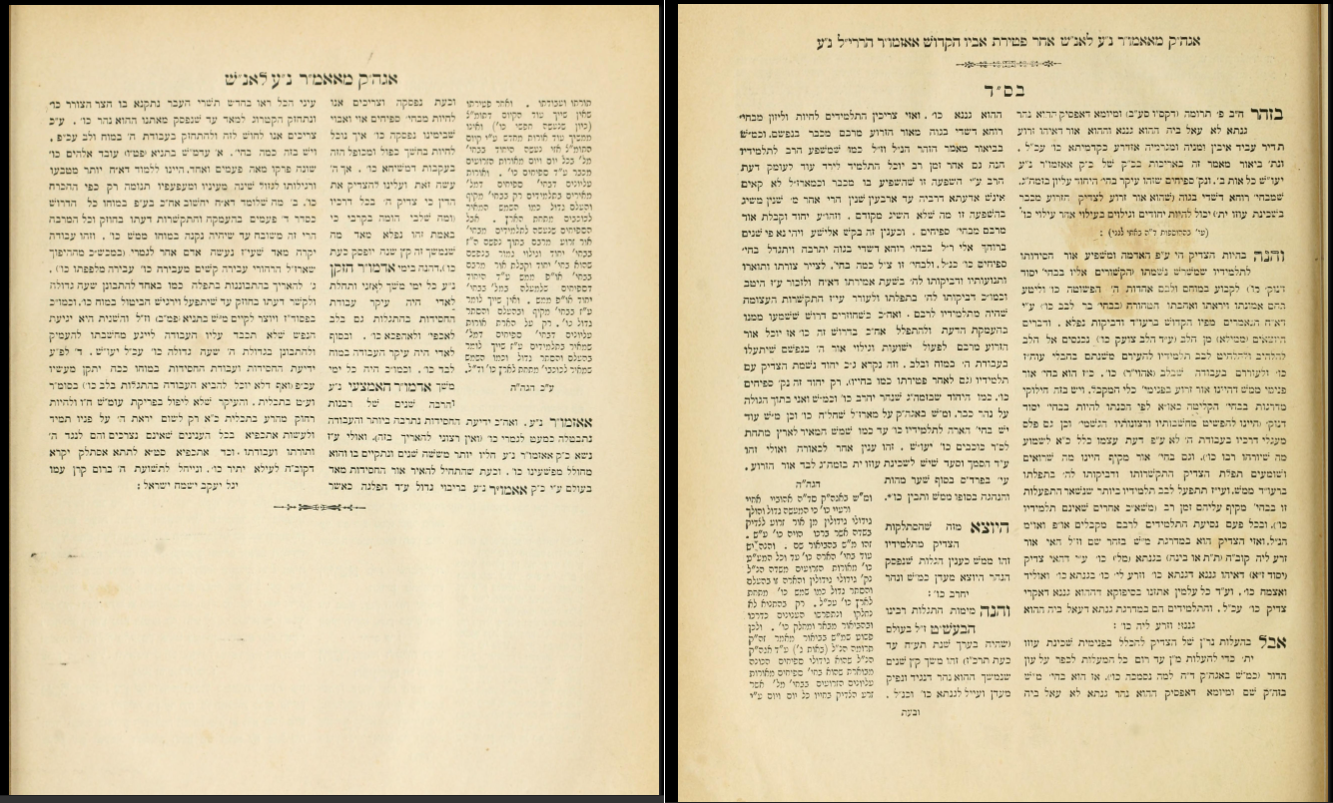
Letter from the Rebbe of Kapust outlining some of the history of Chabad

The Kopust group was founded following the death of the third rebbe of Chabad, Rabbi Menachem Mendel Schneersohn, the Tzemach Tzedek. At the time of Rabbi Menachem Mendel's death, several of his sons assumed the title of rebbe, splitting the movement into several groups. Following Chabad-Lubavitch, the Kapust group was the longest surviving group. Kapust appears not to have any major theological disputes with the leaders of Chabad. The group had four rebbes:

- Rabbi Yehuda Leib Schneersohn of Kopys, the Maharil, (1811–1866), son of Rabbi Menachem Mendel Schneersohn, founder of the Kapust group. Rabbi Yehuda Leib died within the year of his founding of the group.
- Rabbi Shlomo Zalman Schneersohn of Kopys (1830–1900), son of Rabbi Yehuda Leib. Rabbi Shlomo Zalman assumed the title of rebbe following his father's death, a title he held until his own death in 1900. In Chabad circles he is often referred to simply as "the Kapuster". Shlomo Zalman authored a volume on Hasidism, titled Magen Avos ("Shield of the Fathers").
- Rabbi Shmaryahu Noah Schneersohn of Kopys and Bobruisk (1846–1926), the brother of Rabbi Shlomo Zalman and Shalom Dovber. Following Rabbi Shalom Dovber's death, he took the lead in the Kopust group. Not later than 1901, he became the rebbe in the town of Bobruisk. He authored Shemen La'Maor on Hasidism.
- Rabbi Shalom Dovber Schneersohn (Rechitser) of Rechitsa (1841-1908), brother of Rabbis Shmaryahu Noah and Shlomo Zalman. Following the death of his brother, Rabbi Shlomo Zalman, Shalom Dovber took the lead in the Chabad. In 1880 he became the rebbe in the town of Rechitsa.

=== Liadi ===
Liadi was founded after the death of the third Chabad rebbe, Rabbi Menachem Mendel Schneersohn. The group was one of several groups that sought to succeed Rabbi Menachem Mendel, whose death created a dispute over his succession. Liadi had two rebbes:

- Rabbi Chaim Schneur Zalman of Liadi (d. 1879), son of Rabbi Menachem Mendel Schneersohn, and founder of the group.
- Rabbi Yitzchak Dovber of Liadi, son of Rabbi Chaim Schneur Zalman.

=== Niezhin ===
Niezhin was founded after the death of the third Chabad rebbe, Rabbi Menachem Mendel Schneersohn. The group was one of several groups that sought to succeed Rabbi Menachem Mendel, whose death created a dispute over his succession. The group had one rebbe, Rabbi Yisroel Noach of Niezhin, son of Rabbi Menachem Mendel Schneersohn, who founded the group.

=== Avrutch ===
Avrutch was founded after the death of the third Chabad rebbe, Rabbi Menachem Mendel Schneersohn. The group was one of several groups that sought to succeed Rabbi Menachem Mendel, whose death created a dispute over his succession. The group had one rebbe, Rabbi Yosef Yitzchak of Avrutch, son of Rabbi Menachem Mendel Schneersohn, who founded the group.

== Other offshoot efforts and groups ==
Other offshoot efforts in Chabad have occurred in the movement's history and some groups have branched from the Chabad movement. One group was formed to succeed the seventh Chabad rebbe, Rabbi Menachem Mendel Schneerson.

=== Malachim ===
The Malachim were formed as a quasi-Hasidic group. The group claims to recognize the teachings of the first four rebbes of Chabad, thus rivaling the later Chabad rebbes. It is claimed that a personal dispute between its founder and the fifth Chabad rebbe, Shalom DovBer Schneersohn, was a prime factor affecting its split with Chabad.

The Malachim had one rebbe, Rabbi Chaim Avraham Dov Ber Levine (1859/1860–1938), also known as "The Malach" (lit. "the angel"). He was a follower of Rabbis Shmuel Schneersohn and Shalom Dovber Schneersohn, the fourth and fifth rebbes of Chabad. He was also the tutor of Rabbi Yosef Yitzchok Schneersohn, the sixth rebbe of Chabad. While Levine did not leave a successor, the Malachim group continues to maintain a yeshiva and minyan in Williamsburg, Brooklyn.

=== Liozna ===
Following the death of the seventh Chabad rebbe, Rabbi Menachem Mendel Schneerson, Rabbi Shaul Shimon Deutch, a member of Chabad, attempted to found a group of his own. Deutch took the title "Liozna Rebbe", after the town of Liozna where Chabad founder Rabbi Shneur Zalman served as rebbe for a number of years. Deutch failed to gain broad support and was subsequently derided within the Chabad movement for the move.

== Leaders of Jewish movements inspired by Chabad ==
Some Jewish groups were founded by former followers of Chabad. These founders did not intend to succeed or rival the leaders of Chabad. Instead, these former followers of Chabad formed their own groups, drawing from their prior experiences as former Chabad adherents, transmitting Chabad teachings to their own followers.

=== Jewish Renewal ===
Zalman Schachter-Shalomi was affiliated with Chabad at the start of his career. He later left the Chabad movement and was instrumental in founding the Jewish Renewal movement. Schechter frequently cites Chabad teachings in his writings, and gives credit to Chabad for teaching him "davenology", a guide to Jewish prayer and meditation.

=== Carlebach ===
Rabbi Shlomo Carlebach, singer-songwriter and rabbi, was originally affiliated with Chabad at the start of his career. He later left the movement and attracted a following of his own.
