= Michael Levi Rodkinson =

American publisher (1845–1904)

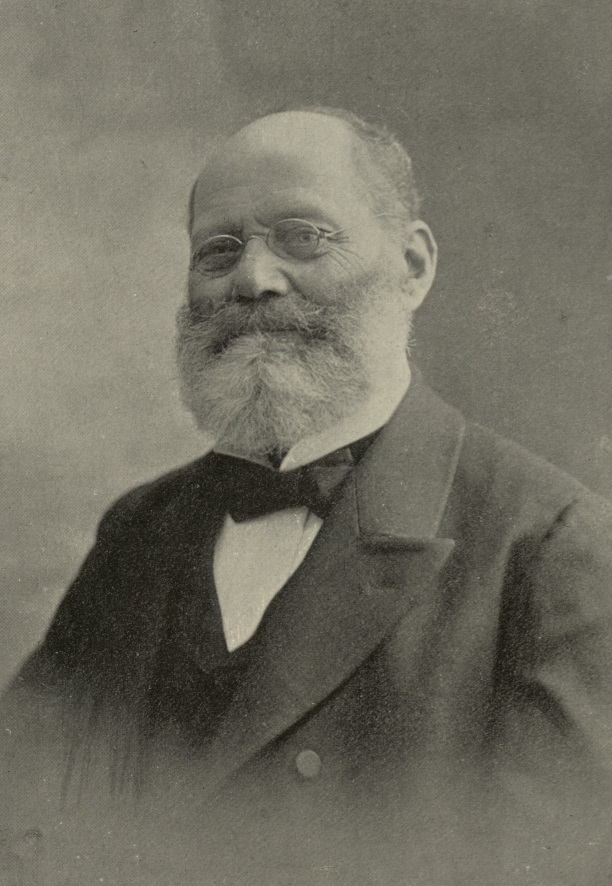
- Born: Michael Levi Frumkin; 1845; Dubrovno, Russian Empire
- Died: 4 January 1904 (aged 58–59); New York City, New York, United States
- Relatives: Aaron HaLevi ben Moses of Staroselye (grandfather); Israel Dov Frumkin (half-brother)
- Writing career
- Pen name: Shulem Varhaft (שלום ווארהאפט)

Michael Levi Rodkinson (1845 – January 4, 1904) was a Jewish scholar, an early Hasidic historiographer and an American publisher. Rodkinson is known for being the first to translate the Babylonian Talmud to English. Rodkinson’s literary works cover topics in Hasidic historiography as well as Judaic studies associated with the Haskalah movement.

== Biography ==
Born in the Russian Empire with the surname "Frumkin", Michael Levi was the son of Alexander Sender Frumkin and half brother of Israel Dov Bär Frumkin, the editor of The Havatzeleth newspaper in Jerusalem, Arieh Tzvi Hirsch Frumkin and Guishe Frumkin-Navon. Rodkinson's mother was Radka Chayah Horowitz (1802–47) who died at an early age when he was still young. Michael Levi was named after his grandfather, Aaron ha-Levi ben Moses of Staroselye, a prominent rabbi of the Chabad movement, who created his own Hasidic group in Usha and then in Starosjle. Michael grew up in a Hasidic Chabad atmosphere.

He changed his name to Rodkinson (after his mother's name "Radka") for unknown reasons. He lived in Germany for a period of time where he published some of his books, then moved to the United States and settled in New York City, where he worked as a publisher. Among his works is an uncompleted translation of the Babylonian Talmud to English. The translation was harshly reviewed, eliciting the derision of talmudists such as Kaufmann Kohler, who labeled Rodkinson a "sham scholar" for the many apparently misinformed or naive translations of common talmudical terms.

Ephraim Deinard was a critic of Rodkinson and is described as a literary adversary.

Rabbi Isaac M. Wise publicly defended Rodkinson after he faced criticism in the pages of the American Jewish press.

Rodkinson collected many stories from his childhood amongst the Hassidim, and compiled these into books that he later published. These were among the first books to tell stories in Hebrew and Yiddish. (Until then, Hebrew was mostly used as a kind of Jewish and Rabbinic lingua franca for works of scholarship in letters, Talmud, halakha, philosophy, ethics, Kabbalah, and hassidut while Yiddish was used as a spoken language by Jews across Ashkenaz.)

Rodkinson married three times; his oldest child with his first wife was Rosamond Rodkinson. She helped her father translate the Talmud and also traveled the world to gather support. His next child with his second wife was his son Max Rodkinson, a famous actor of the Yiddish theater in New York. Max changed his name to "Rudolph Marks" because his father did not want him to use the "Rodkinson" name as a Yiddish actor. After a few years of acting he left the stage and became a lawyer, taking back his original name. His third child also from his second wife was Norbert Mortimer Rodkinson, who also helped his father translate the Talmud into English. Michael Levi Rodkinson had another son and two daughters with his third wife.

== Published works ==
- Sefer Adas Tzaddikim (Lemberg 1869)
- Toldot Baalei Shem Tov (Konigsberg, 1876)
- Toldot Amudei HaChabad [History of the Pillars of Chabad] (Konigsberg, 1876)
- Tefilah le-Mosheh (mi-Kutsi): Toldot ha-tefillin ve-korotehen (Pressburg 1883)
- Eben Haroscha: Verschiedene Ausichten betreffs der Reform des Jüdischen ritualgesetzes der "Judenfrage" und deren Lösung [Different views on the reform of the Jewish ritual law of the "Jewish question" and its solution] (Berlin 1884)
- Der Shulchan Aruch und seine Beziehungen zu den Juden und nichtJuden (Vienna, 1883–87)
- History of amulets, charms, and talismans : a historical investigation into their nature and origin (New York: 1893)
- The Pentateuch, its Languages and its Characters: A Treatise Upon the Original Language and the Early Translations of the Pentateuch into Greek and Aramaic (Chicago: Bloch and Co., 1894)
- New edition of the Babylonian Talmud (New York, New Talmud Pub. Co., 1901)

== Gallery ==
Newspaper clippings relating to M. L. Rodkinson
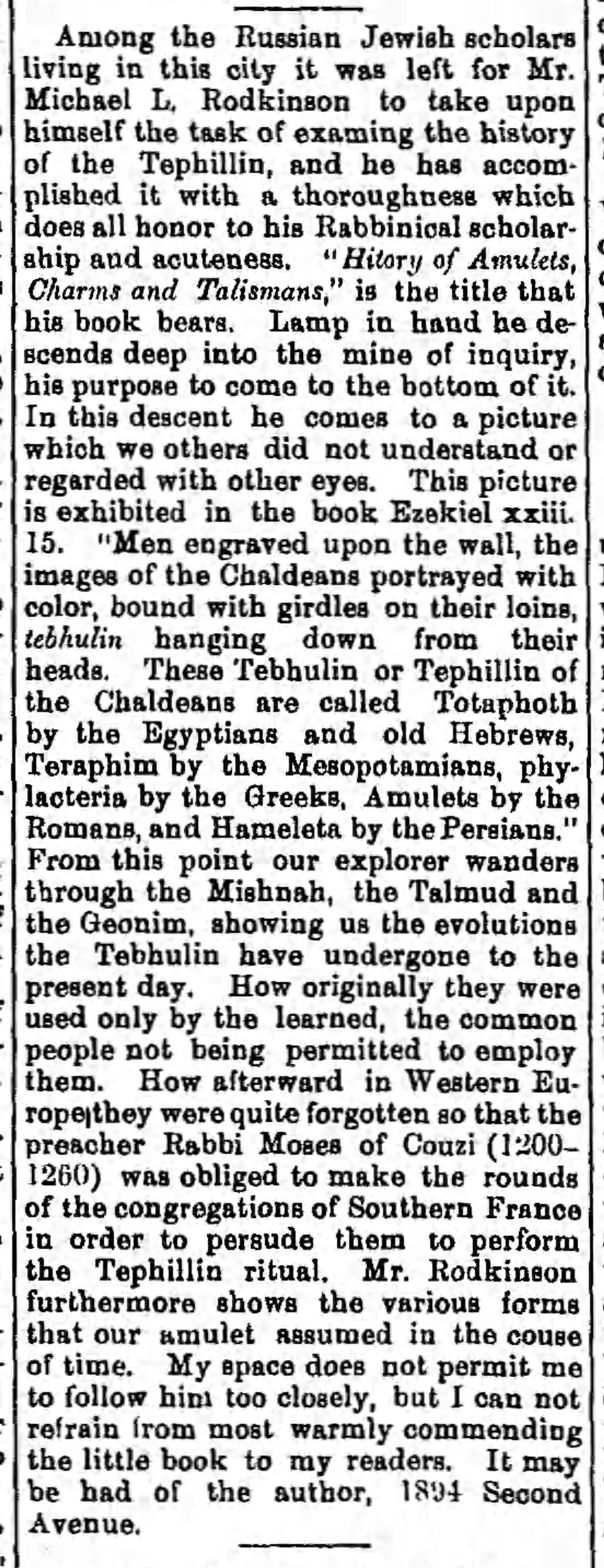
1892 article on Rodkinson in The American Israelite

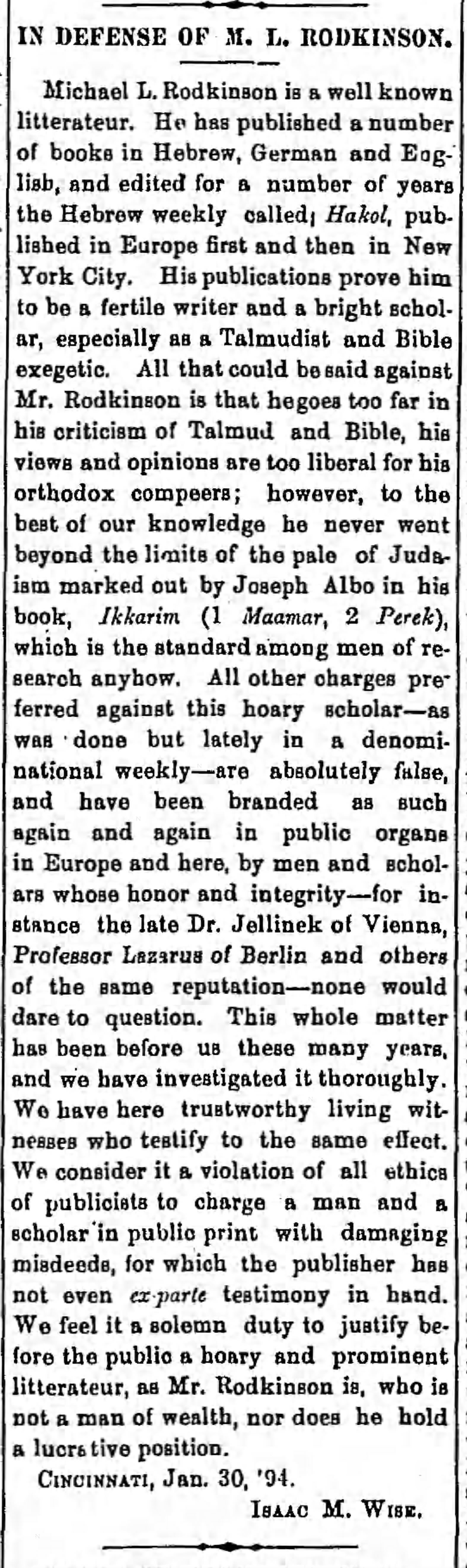
1894 letter by Rabbi Isaac M. Wise defending Rodkinson

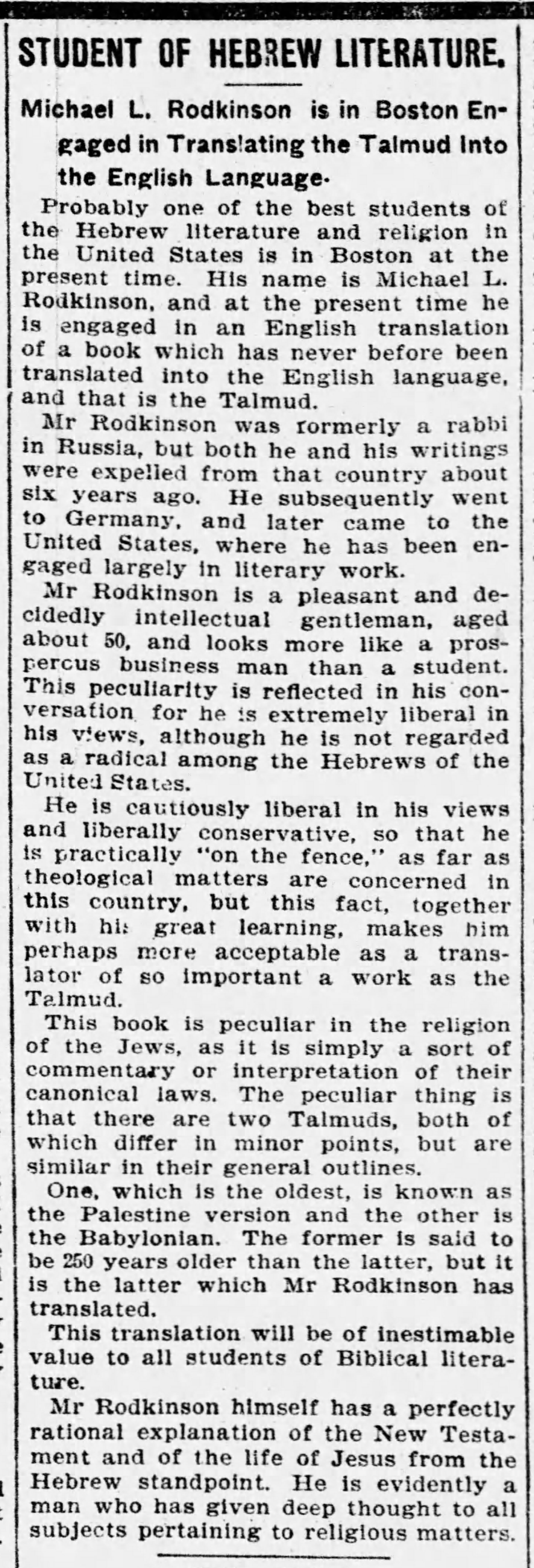
1895 article on Rodkinson in The Boston Globe

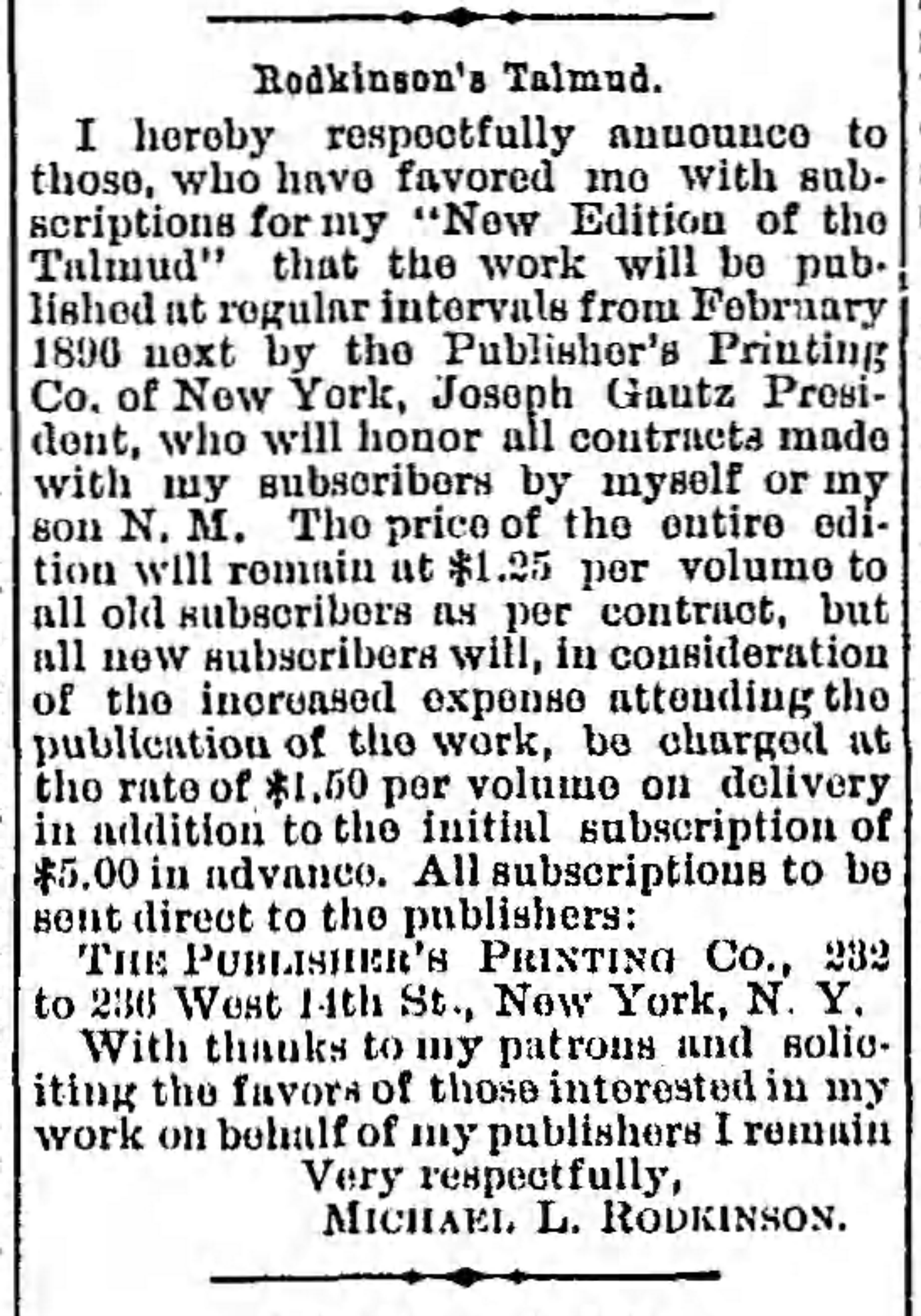
1895 announcement of "Rodkinson's Talmud" in The American Israelite

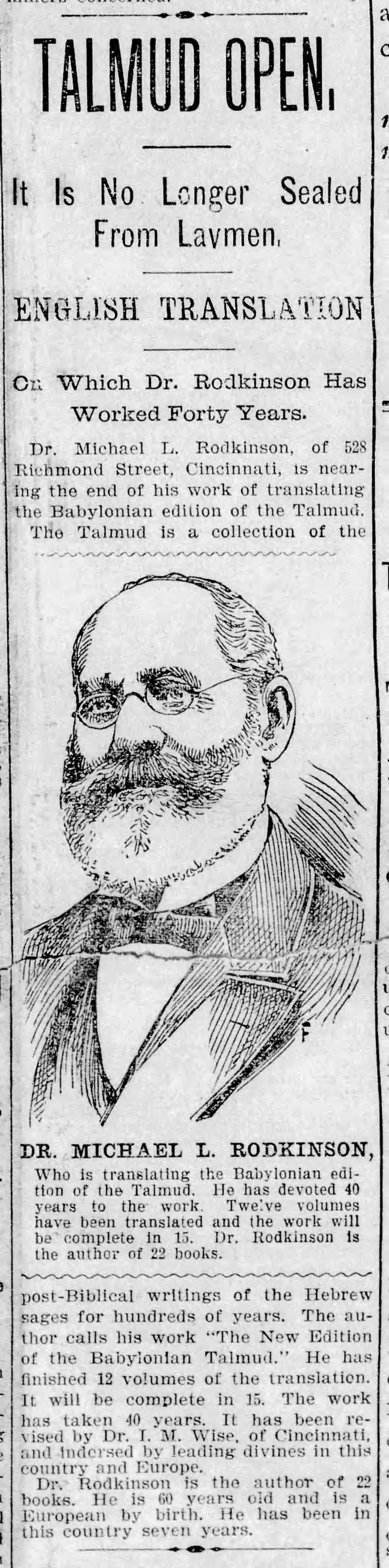
1896 article and sketch of Rodkinson in The Kentucky Post and Times-Star

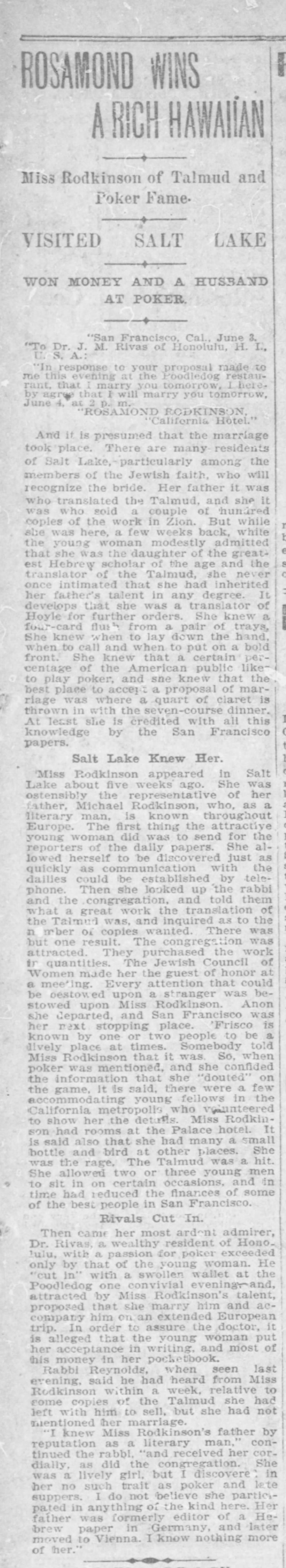
1901 report concerning Rodkinson's daughter's efforts to promote his English Talmud edition

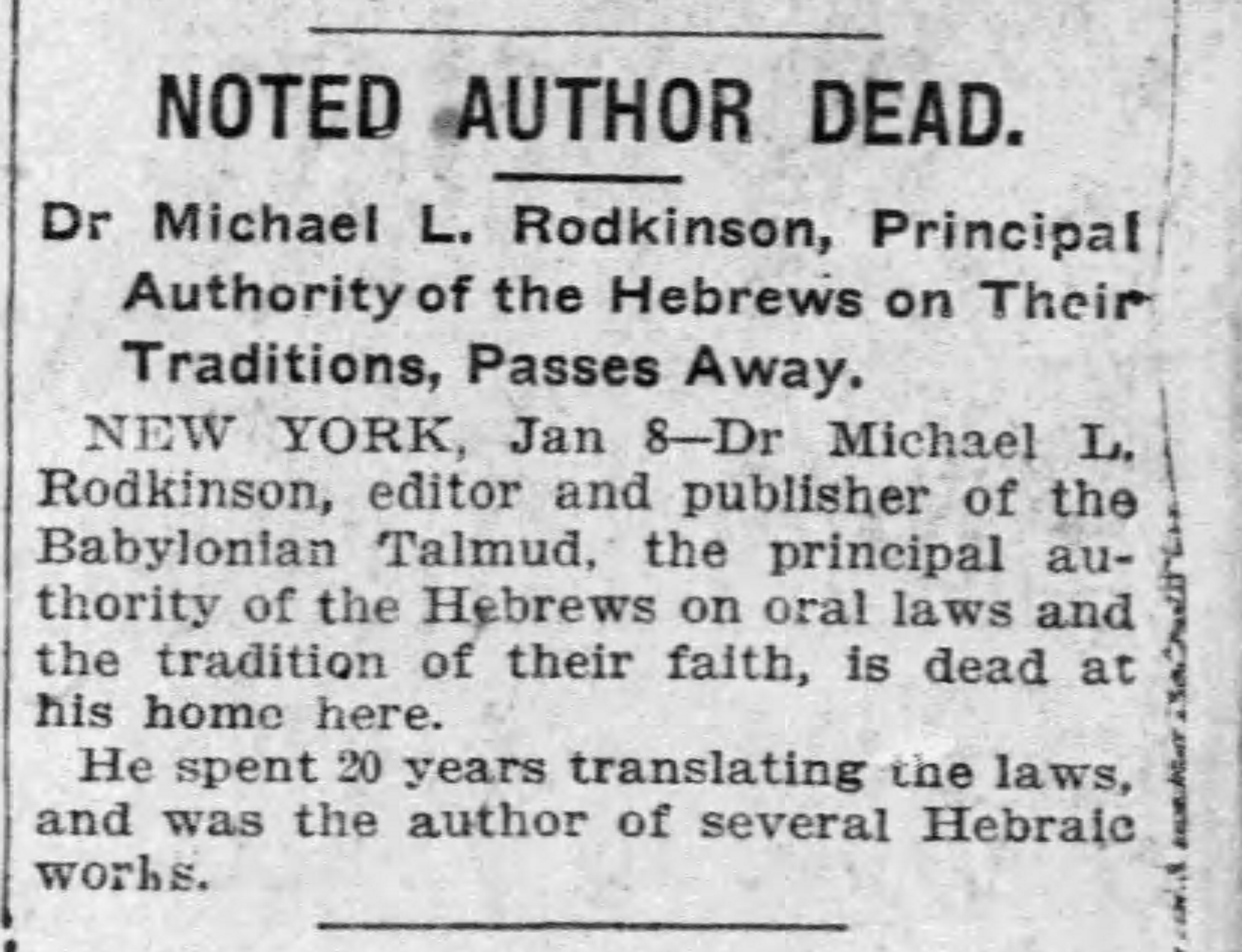
1904 obituary in The Boston Globe

== See also ==
- Beit Rebbe, a 1902 work on Chabad history
