= Israel Dov Frumkin =

Hebrew journalist

- ישראל דב פרומקין
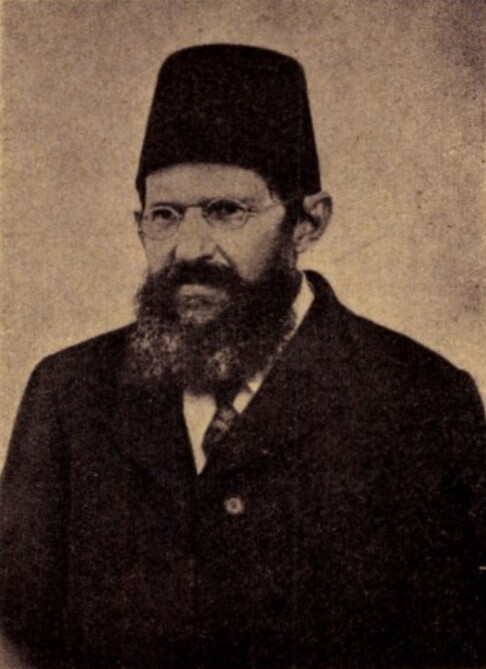
- Israel Dov Frumkin
- Born: October 29, 1850; Dubrovno, Russian Empire
- Died: May 10, 1914 (aged 63); Jerusalem, Mutasarrifate of Jerusalem
- Occupations: Author, journalist
- Children: Abraham Frumkin, Gad Frumkin
- Relatives: Carmi Gillon (great-grandson)
- Writing career
- Notable work: Havatzelet

Israel Dov Frumkin (Hebrew: ישראל דב פרומקין; 29 October 1850 – 10 May 1914) was an author and pioneer of Hebrew journalism.

== Family ==
He was born into a Chabad family in Dubrovno, in the Russian Empire. Frumkin's step-grandfather was Aaron ha-Levi ben Moses of Staroselye, a close disciple of Rabbi Shneur Zalman of Liadi. He emigrated to Jerusalem, Damascus Eyalet on 19 December 1859, at the age of nine, with his father, Alexander Sender Frumkin, mother and brother. His half-brother Michael Levi, who assumed the name Rodkinson, published in New York the first translation of the Talmud to English. His sister Guishe Frumkin-Navon married Yosef Navon Bey, who built the Jaffa–Jerusalem railway. His son Abraham Frumkin (1872–1946), a prominent Jewish anarchist, was a contributor to the daily Yiddische Welt, of New York. Another son, Gad Frumkin (1887–1960), was one of the first trained attorneys in Palestine and a member of the supreme court during the British Mandate. Gad Frumkin's grandson—and thus Israel Dov Frumkin's great-grandson—is Carmi Gilon, who was head of the Shabak (Israeli security service).

== Havatzelet ==
In 1869 Frumkin edited the Hebrew semi-monthly newspaper Havatzelet, which had been founded in Jerusalem by his father-in-law, Yisrael Bak, a printer, in 1865, and a few years later he edited a Judæo-German weekly called Die Rose. The latter, owing to lack of support, was soon discontinued. Havatzelet was changed to a weekly with a literary supplement; it was issued between 1868 and 1911. Its publication was spasmodically interrupted through the intrigues and machinations of the zealots of Jerusalem, whom Frumkin constantly denounced for the lack of reform in the "halukkah" system. Eventually, however, he became reconciled to the management.

In 1883, for reflecting upon Gen. Lew Wallace, the American Minister to the Ottoman Empire, in an editorial in Havatzelet (xiii. No. 6), headed "An American and yet a Despot", the Havatzelet was suspended, and Frumkin was imprisoned for forty-five days, by order from Constantinople directed to the pasha of Jerusalem. The incident which caused the editorial was the dismissal of Joseph Kriger, the Jewish secretary and interpreter to the pasha of Jerusalem, at the request of Wallace, who complained that Kriger had failed to receive him with the honor due to his rank, and who refused to issue any apology for the alleged shortcoming. Frumkin claimed that the proceeding was instigated by the missionaries, whom Wallace strongly supported.

== Other activities ==
After his release, Frumkin organized the society 'Ezrat Niddaḥim in honor of Sir Moses and Lady Judith Montefiore and to counteract the influence of the missionaries. 'Ezrat Niddaḥim was active in support and education of Yemeni Jews and in building a village for them at Silwan. Frumkin was the author of several books, mostly translations.

== Death ==
He died in Jerusalem, Mutasarrifate of Jerusalem in 1914.

== See also ==
- Nisan Bak, brother-in-law and associate of Israel Dov Frumkin
