= Abraham Frumkin =

Jewish anarchist (1873–1940)

- אברהם פרומקין
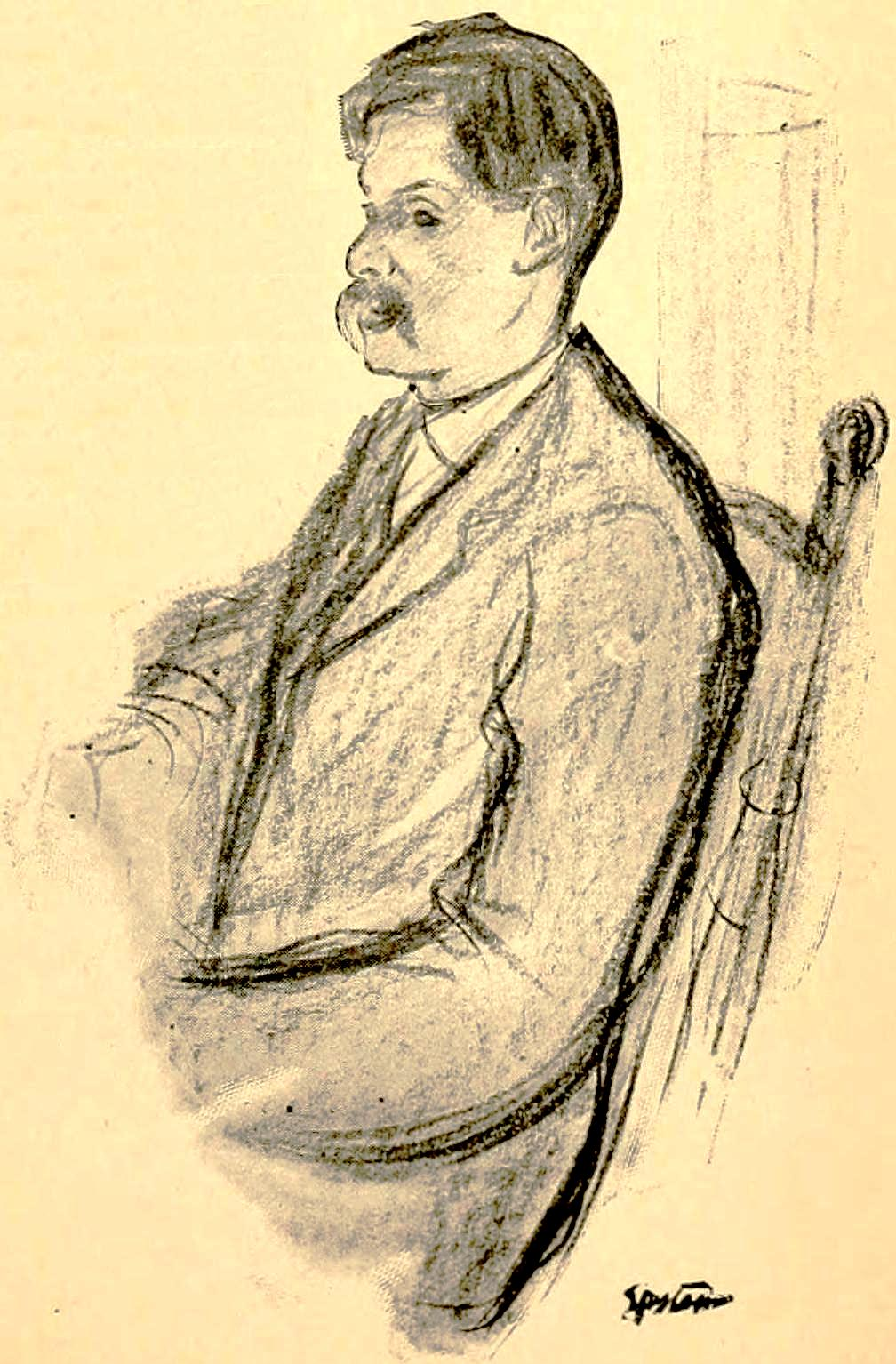
- Illustration of Frumkin by Jacob Epstein
- Born: 1872; Jerusalem, Ottoman Palestine
- Died: 29 April 1940 (aged 67–68); New York, United States
- Occupations: Journalist; Translator
- Movement: Anarchism, Yiddishism
- Father: Israel Dov Frumkin
- Relatives: Gad Frumkin (brother)

Abraham Frumkin (Hebrew: אברהם פרומקין; 1872 – 29 April 1940) was a Jewish journalist, translator and anarchist writer. Raised by a proto-Zionist family in the multicultural and multilingual environment of Jerusalem (then part of Ottoman Palestine), Frumkin became an advocate of transnational Yiddish culture and gravitated towards the political philosophy of anarchism. After spending time in Istanbul, he moved to London, where he edited the Yiddish anarchist newspaper Arbeter Fraint. After the newspaper shuttered, he moved to New York and spent the 1900s translating numerous avant-garde works into Yiddish, while continuing to write for Jewish anarchist and socialist publications.

== Biography ==
Abraham Frumkin was born in Jerusalem, in 1872. Frumkin himself was raised by a Proto-Zionist family, which had settled in Palestine prior to the First Aliyah. He grew up in a multicultural and multilingual Jerusalem, where he learnt to fluently speak the Arabic language at an early age. He later recalled that "the times were different then", as the Israeli–Palestinian conflict had not yet developed. His father Israel Dov published his newspaper Havatzelet in Hebrew, Ladin and Yiddish, in order to reach a wide segment of Jerusalem's Jewish population, and raised his children to speak Yiddish. Abraham himself grew to love Yiddish culture and advocate for Yiddishism. Abraham joined the Lovers of Zion and contributed to the Hebrew newspapers HaMelitz and Ha-Tsfira. He began a career as a journalist, then briefly taught the Arabic language at a school in Jaffa, before moving to Istanbul in 1891 to study law. He had been promised funding for his education, but never received it. He subsequently moved to New York, where he socialised with the city's Jewish community and through them discovered the political philosophy of anarchism.

In 1894, Frumkin returned to Istanbul, where he met the Russian Jewish revolutionaries Moses and Nastia Schapiro. Through the Schapiros, Frumkin learned of and began contributing to the London-based Yiddish anarchist newspaper Arbeter Fraint. In 1896, he and the Schapiros moved to London. There Frumkin became the editor of Arbeter Fraint, taking over from Woolf Wess. Together with Moses Schapiro, he also began translating and publishing radical literature in the Yiddish language. Frumkin quickly became an influential figure in the city's Jewish community. He wrote highly of the city's Jewish anarchist group, praising its working-class members for their spirit of self-sacrifice, as they donated much of their own money to the movement despite their struggles to earn enough for themselves. He also recalled that, during this time, Schapiro had been troubled by the question of whether anarchists were allowed to have bank accounts: "he couldn't understand how an anarchist could save, get interest on his money, while others are in need". Frumkin was himself financially dependent on his spouse during this time and was one of only a few Jewish anarchists that credited his wife for enabling him to spend his time writing.

During his time as editor of Arbeter Fraint, Frumkin met the American anarchist Voltairine de Cleyre and watched her recite poetry in Whitechapel; despite not understanding the English language well, he was transfixed by the "melodic tones" of her voice. His essay about her, initially published in Fraye Arbeter Shtime and later included in his memoirs, was praised by historian Paul Avrich, who described it as one of the best about de Cleyre "in any language". In 1897, after Arbeter Fraint suspended publication, Frumkin established another newspaper, The Propagandist, which put out 11 issues before shuttering. In 1898, he moved to Paris, and then in 1899, he returned to the United States. Rudolf Rocker later took over Arbeter Fraint.

Throughout the early 20th century, Frumkin translated several works of the European avant-garde into Yiddish. These included Maurice Maeterlinck's play The Blind (published in 1906), Henrik Ibsen's play When We Dead Awaken (published in 1908) and Knut Hamsun's novel Mysteries (published in 1911). Due in part to Frumkin's promotion of his works, Hamsun gained a high regard among Yiddish speakers, which lasted until he declared his support for the Quisling regime. In 1911, Frumkin published Multatuli's Love Letters, which received a foreword from Rudolf Rocker. That same year, Frumkin also worked on a translation of Robert Louis Stevenson's The Suicide Club, but it's unclear if it was published. In 1921, Frumkin translated Sergei Stepniak's memoir Underground Russia into Yiddish. The National Library of Israel later incorrectly attributed a number of Frumkin's translations to Esther Frumkin.

Frumkin wrote for a range of Yiddish publications in New York, including the socialist newspaper The Forward. He also continued contributing to Yiddish anarchist newspapers and later wrote a memoir, In the Springtime of Jewish Socialism. In his memoir, he wrote about what he described as a united international community of Yiddish speakers, which existed throughout Europe, the Middle East and North America. Frumkin died in 1940.

== Bibliography ==
- Avrich, Paul (1978). An American Anarchist: The Life of Voltairine de Cleyre. Princeton: Princeton University Press. ISBN 978-0-691-04657-0.
- Bartal, Israel (2020). Tangled Roots: The Emergence of Israeli Culture. SBL Press. ISBN 9781951498740.
- Faigan, Suzanne Sarah (2018). An Annotated Bibliography of Maria Yakovlevna Frumkina (Esther) (PhD thesis). Australian National University.
- Gidley, Ben (2014). "Towards a cosmopolitan account of Jewish socialism: class, identity and immigration in Edwardian London". Socialist History journal. 45: 61–79. ISSN 0969-4331.
- Gidley, Ben (2018). "Spaces of Informal Learning and Cultures of Translation and Marginality in London's Jewish East End". In Nichols, Sue; Dobson, Stephen (eds.). Learning Cities: Multimodal Explorations and Placed Pedagogies. Springer. pp. 169–182. doi:10.1007/978-981-10-8100-2_11. ISBN 978-981-10-8098-2.
- Grave, Jaap (2019). "Multatuli - His Work Through the World". In D'haen, Theo (ed.). Dutch and Flemish Literature as World Literature. Bloomsbury. pp. 82–103. ISBN 9781501340147.
- Hemmerle, Joachim (2009). "A Yiddish Treasure Island and its Cultural Background". In Ambrosini, Richard; Dury, Richard (eds.). European Stevenson. Cambridge Scholars Publishing. pp. 227–240. ISBN 978-1-4438-1436-2.
- Horrox, James (2010). "Frumkin, Abraham (1872–1940)". In Ness, Immanuel (ed.). The International Encyclopedia of Revolution and Protest. doi:10.1002/9781405198073.wbierp1687. ISBN 978-1-4051-8464-9.
- Leftwich, Joseph (1987). "Rudolf Rocker: mentor of the Jewish Anarchists". Jewish Quarterly. 34 (2): 30–33. doi:10.1080/0449010X.1987.10703749.
- Mendel, Yonatan (2014). "Rooting Security in Arabic Soil". The Creation of Israeli Arabic. Palgrave Studies in Languages at War. Palgrave Macmillan. pp. 11–40. doi:10.1057/9781137337375_2.
- Rosenberg, Karen (2001). "The Cult of Self-Sacrifice in Yiddish Anarchism and Saul Yanovsky's The First Years of Jewish Libertarian Socialism". In Estraikh, Gennady; Krutikov, Mikhail (eds.). Yiddish and the Left. Legenda. pp. 178–194. ISBN 1-900755-48-3.
- Shpayer, Haia (1981). British anarchism 1881-1914: reality and appearance (PhD thesis). University of London.
- Zimmer, Kenyon (2015). Immigrants Against the State: Yiddish and Italian Anarchism in America. University of Illinois Press. ISBN 978-0-252-03938-6. LCCN 2015940460.
