= Gad Frumkin =

Israeli jurist (1887–1960)

- גד פרומקין
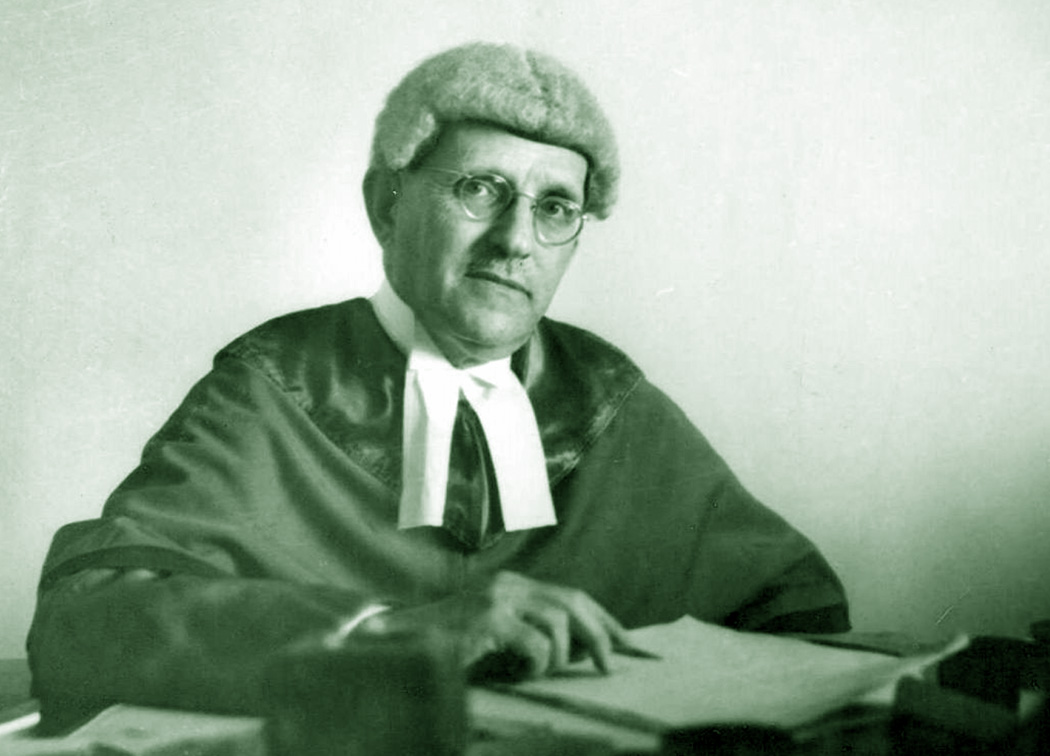
- Gad Frumkin in the 1930s
- Born: August 2, 1887; Jerusalem, Ottoman Empire
- Died: March 10, 1960 (aged 72)
- Occupation: Jurist
- Known for: One of the first trained attorneys in Mandatory Palestine
- Spouse: Hannah Eisenberg
- Children: 4, including Sa'ada Frumkin
- Relatives: Carmi Gillon (grandson)

Gad Frumkin (Hebrew: גד פרומקין; August 2, 1887 – March 10, 1960) was an Israeli jurist. He was one of the first trained attorneys in Palestine prior to Israeli independence and one of the few Jews who served as a judge on the Supreme Court of Mandatory Palestine.

== Early life and family ==
Frumkin was born in Jerusalem in 1887 to a family that was part of Jerusalem's Ashkenazi elite. His father was Israel Dov Frumkin, a pioneer of Hebrew journalism in Palestine who edited and published the Havatzelet newspaper, while his brother Abraham Frumkin was a prominent Jewish anarchist. Frumkin grew up in the Muslim Quarter of Jerusalem's Old City, in a predominantly Arab environment. While Jewish and Arab children at the time typically clashed and threw stones at each other, Frumkin's father had close relations with Arab elites and intellectuals. In his youth he did not attend school, but rather was instructed by private tutors, and worked in his father's newspaper Havatzelet.

Frumkin married Hannah Eisenberg, the daughter of founder of Rehovot, Aharon Eisenberg, and had four children. Their daughter Sa'ada was Deputy Attorney General and their son Yadin was an Israel Defense Forces officer who served as first the commander of the HaKirya military base. One of Frumkin's grandchildren is the Israeli politician, diplomat, and Shin Bet commander Carmi Gillon.

== Legal career ==
In 1908, Frumkin left for Constantinople to study law at the encouragement of his father-in-law and to the dismay of his father. Together with David Ben-Gurion, Yitzhak Ben-Zvi, Moshe Sharett, David Remez, Israel Shochat, and Manya Shochat, who were also studying in Constantinople at that time, he organized an association of Jewish students on behalf of the Ottoman Hebrew Trainees Association. Frumkin headed the organization while Ben-Gurion served as its secretary. In 1914 Frumkin began working as an adviser to the Ottoman Admiralty but returned to Palestine with the outbreak of World War I.

He became the third certified Jewish attorney in Palestine at the time of his return. The other two Jewish attorneys, Eliyahu Faraji and Yom Tov Hamon, dealt mainly with lobbying and land trading, while Frumkin dealt with a variety of legal issues. He represented Jewish settlements in Palestine, the Deutsche-Palestina bank, the Anglo-Palestine bank, as well as defendants accused of Zionism and treachery including Arthur Ruppin. After the British conquest of Palestine in World War I, Norman Bentwich, a legal official in the British administration, remarked that he was the "only qualified Jewish advocate" in Jerusalem.

In 1918, Frumkin was appointed to the Jerusalem Magistrate's Court and in 1920 he was appointed a judge on the Supreme Court of Palestine. He would serve as a Supreme Court judge throughout the British Mandate period up to the termination of the British Mandate in 1948. During this time he also participated in a variety of public activities. He taught civil law at the Mandatory Law School and served as President of the B'nai B'rith Lodge in Palestine. He was also a founder and Chairman of the Friends of the Hebrew University of Jerusalem organization and was a member of the Hebrew University's Board of Governors. In 1941, Frumkin was granted the title of Honorary Commander in Order of the British Empire (OBE).

Upon Israeli independence in 1948, Frumkin, who had been the longest-serving Jewish judge in Palestine and one of only three Jews to have served on the Mandatory Supreme Court, seemed an obvious choice for appointment to the new Supreme Court of Israel but his appointment was blocked. Jurists of the ruling Mapai party worked to block the appointment of judges whose political affiliations they opposed. Israel's first Justice Minister, Pinchas Rosen refused to appoint judges due to political affiliations and worked to appoint fellow "yekkes", or German-born Jews to the court. He appointed his personal business partner Moshe Smoira as President of the Supreme Court and forced Frumkin from the bench in disgrace after claiming that there was "gossip" over Frumkin allegedly having taken a bribe from a client of Rosen's to throw a trial. The accusation was never proven or refuted but a cloud of suspicion hung over Frumkin for the rest of his life.

== Later life ==
In 1950, Frumkin was appointed to head a commission of inquiry into education in the immigrant camps over allegations of anti-religious coercion in the camps. The committee found that while though not a result of a government policy of anti-religious coercion, the uniform education system resulted in the harsh infringement of the new immigrants' freedom of religion. The committee's findings forced the resignation of Education Minister Zalman Shazar and to the fall of Israel's first government, with early elections called for the Second Knesset. After the committee's conclusions, Frumkin was no longer active in public roles. He published his autobiography in 1955 and died in 1960 at the age of 72.
