= Living Torah Museum =

Orthodox Jewish museum group

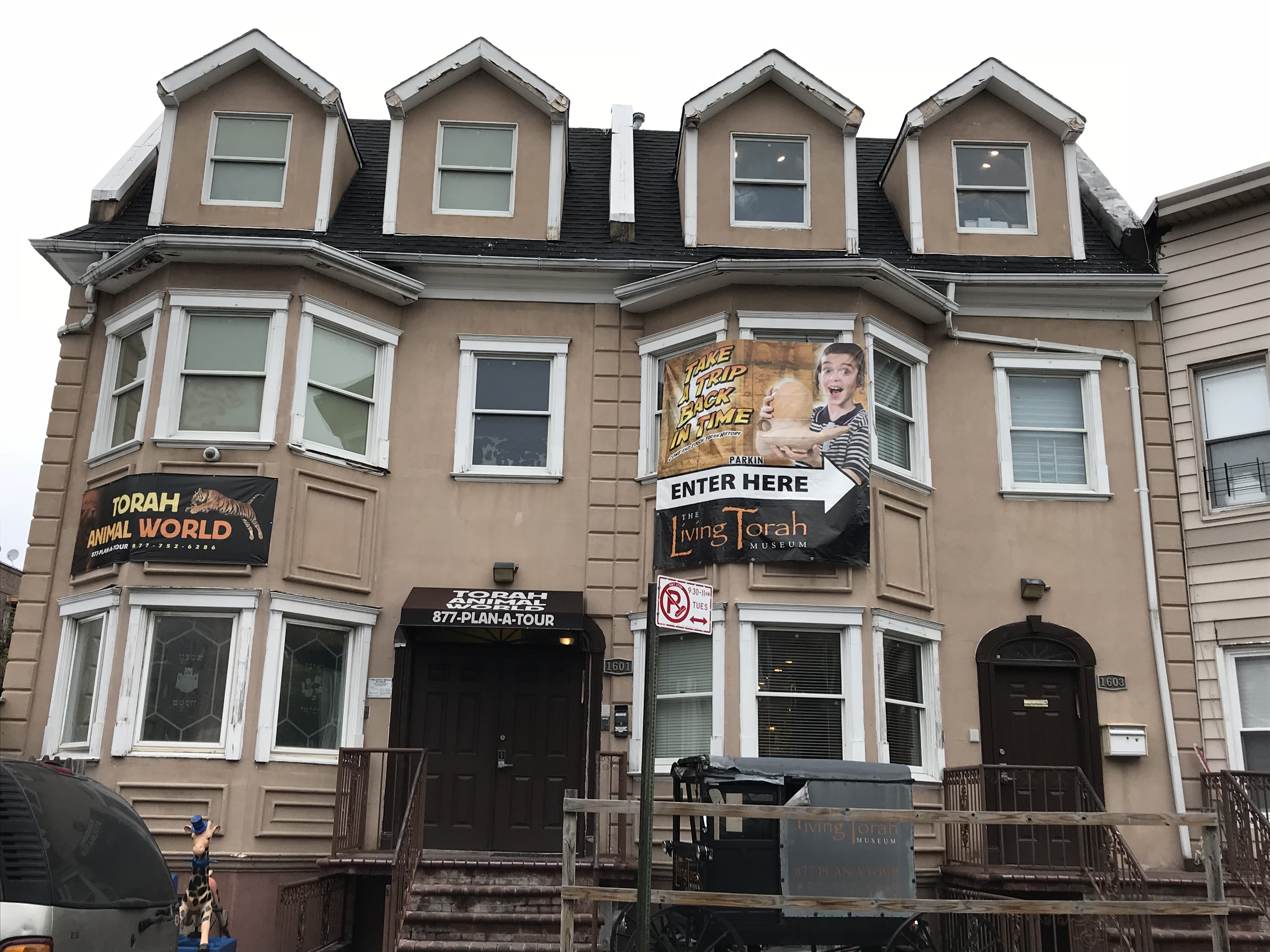

- Location within New York City
- Location: 1601 41st Street, Brooklyn, New York
- Coordinates: 40.635556°N 73.980833°W
- Public transit access: Subway: Ditmas Avenue
- Website: www.thelivingtorahmuseum.com

The Living Torah Museum is a group of Orthodox Jewish museums that opened in 2002 and drew approximately 600,000 visitors in the first twelve years. The museums were founded and are operated by rabbi and author Shaul Shimon Deutsch. The first location is at 1601 41st Street in Borough Park, Brooklyn, New York, United States, and was named a Best Museum of New York by The Village Voice. A second location, in the Catskill Mountains town of Fallsburg, operates during the summer season. A third location, which was open year-round in Lakewood, New Jersey, closed in 2014.

Originally a separate museum that opened in 2008, an exhibit on animals of the Bible and Talmud, known as the Torah Animal World merged with the main museum in 2014. It is also home to examples of Biblical and Talmudic archaeological artifacts and antique Judaica and Jewish books. From 2005 to 2016, the museum was home to the world's oldest known example of a stone tablet inscribed with the Ten Commandments until it was sold at auction for $850,000 in November 2016.
