= Yitzchak Dovber Schneersohn =

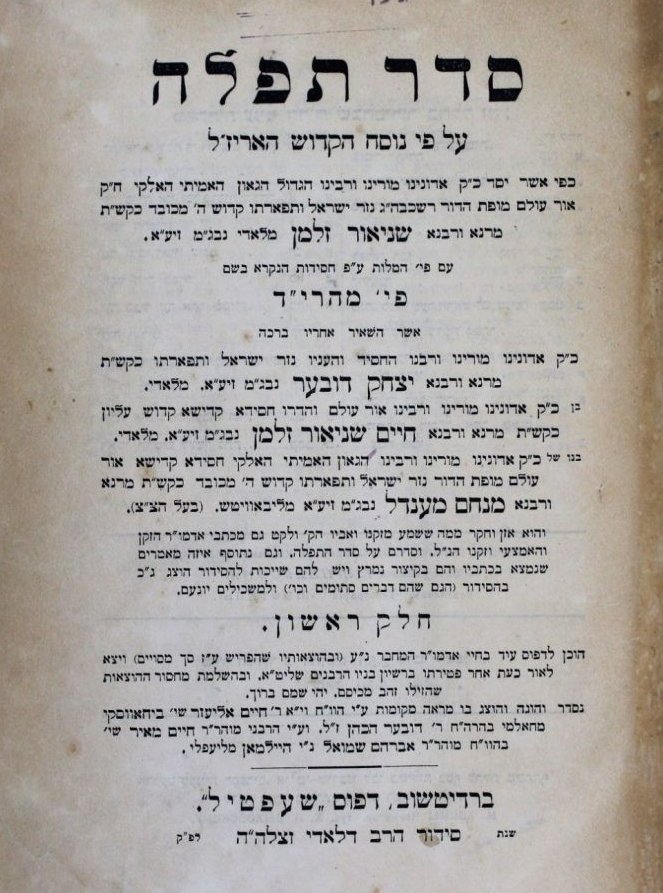
Siddur Maharid

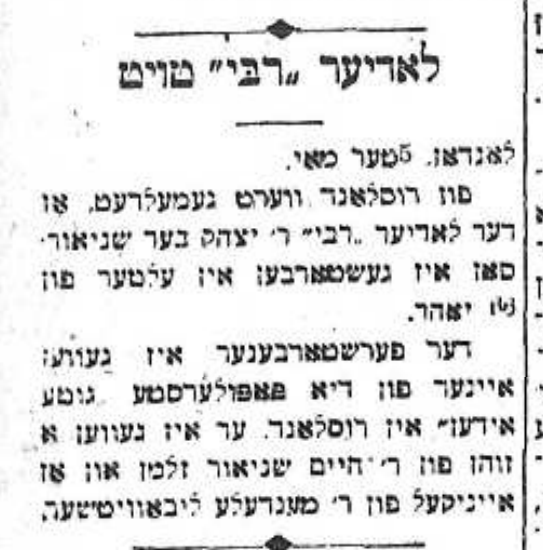
News report of the death of the Liady Rebbe. (Di ṿahrhayṭ – דיא ווארהייט, 6 May 1910 – "Liady Rabbi Dead" לאדיער "רבי" טויט)

Rabbi Yitzchak Dovber Schneersohn of Liadi (1833–1910), was a Hasidic rebbe in the town of Liadi. Rabbi Yitzchak Dovber was the son of Rabbi Chaim Schneur Zalman of Liadi (son of Rabbi Menachem Mendel Schneersohn, the third rebbe of Chabad). Rabbi Yitzchak Dovber succeeded his father as rebbe for a number of Chabad Chasidim in Lyady. His brother-in-law, Rabbi Levi Yitzchak became a rebbe in the town of Sirotin (Siratshin). He and his brother-in-law were the last rebbes of the Liadi branch of Chabad.

== Rebbe in Liadi ==
After the death of Rabbi Menachem Mendel Schneersohn (the third rebbe of Chabad-Lubavitch), several of his sons independently assumed the role of rebbe. Rabbi Yitzchak Dovber's father, Chaim Schneur Zalman assumed the role of rebbe in the Liadi, the same town Rabbi Shneur Zalman of Liadi (the first rebbe of Chabad-Lubavitch), was rebbe. Following Rabbi Chaim Schneur Zalman's death, Rabbi Yitzchak Dovber assumed the title of rebbe in Liadi.

== Family ==
The sons of Rabbi Yitzchak Dovber include Reb Sholom Shachna who filled his place role in Liadi, Reb Yehuda Leib who served as a rabbi in Homel, Siratin, and Vitebsk, Reb Boruch who was a businessman in Smolensk.

== Works authored ==
- Siddur T'filah al pi Nusach HaArizal im Pirush Maharid – A siddur with Chasidic commentary, printed in 1913, Berditchev
- Likkutei Ma'amarim – Chasidic discourses, printed in 1918, Poltava

== See also ==
- Chabad offshoot groups
