= Chaim Schneur Zalman Schneersohn =

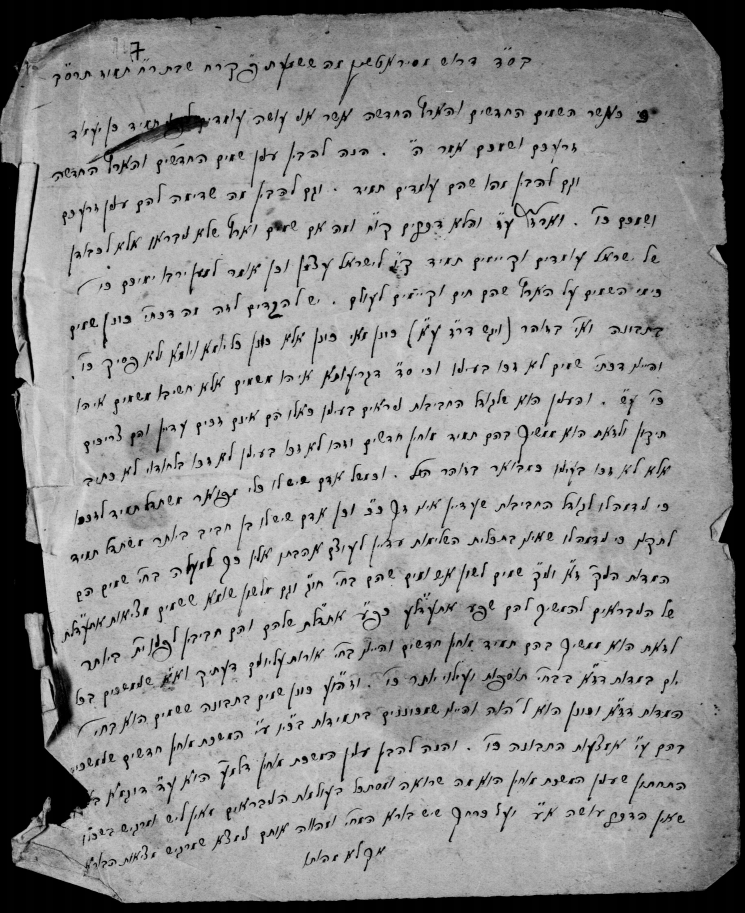
Maamar by Rebbe Chaim Schneur Zalman Schneersohn, 1902

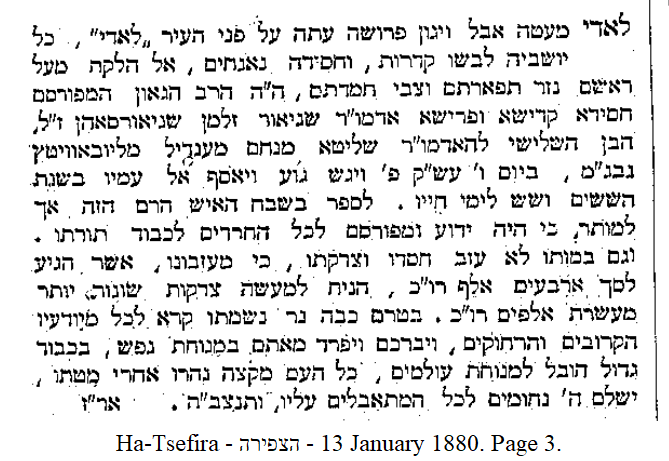
Notice of the Death of Liadi Rebbe Chaim Shneur Zalman Schneersohn. Ha-Tsefira. 1880-01-13. p3.

Chaim Schneur Zalman Schneersohn of Liadi (1814–1880) was a Hasidic rebbe in the town of Liadi. He was the first rebbe of the Liadi branch of Chabad.

== Rebbe in Liadi ==
Rabbi Chaim Schneur Zalman was the son of Rabbi Menachem Mendel Schneersohn (the third rebbe of Chabad-Lubavitch), and became a rebbe in his own right for a number of Chabad Chasidim following his father's death.

After the passing of Rabbi Menachem Mendel Schneersohn (the third rebbe of Chabad-Lubavitch), several of his sons independently assumed the role of rebbe. Rabbi Chaim Schneur Zalman assumed the role of rebbe in the Liadi, the same town his great-grandfather, Rabbi Shneur Zalman of Liadi (the first rebbe of Chabad-Lubavitch), was rebbe. Rabbi Chaim Schneur Zalman was succeeded by his son, Rabbi Yitzchak Dovber of Liadi.

== See also ==
- Chabad offshoot groups
