= Beit Rebbe =

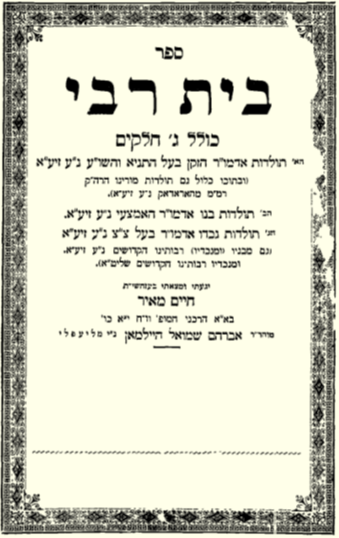
Title page of Beit Rebbe (Berditchev 1902)

Beit Rebbe (or Bet Rabi) (Hebrew: בית רבי, "House of the Rabbi") is a book of Chabad Hasidic history written by Hayim Meir Heilman, published in Berditchev in 1902. The work is seen as among the first to establish a Hasidic tradition of historiography.

The book chronicles the lives of the first three leaders of the Chabad dynasty, as well as their families and students. Among the topics covered in the book are the authenticity of the portrait of Rabbi Shneur Zalman of Liadi, the founder of Chabad.

== See also ==
- Michael Levi Rodkinson, author of Toldot Amudei HaChabad (Konigsberg, 1876)
