= Shaul Shimon Deutsch =

American rabbi and author

Shaul Shimon Deutsch (born 1966) is a rabbi and author from Brooklyn, New York. Originally associated with the Chabad Hasidic community, during the mid-1990s, Deutsch attempted to form a breakaway sect and named himself the Liozna Rebbe. The attempt did not gain popular support and remains a marginal phenomenon in the Chabad Hasidic community.

Following his attempt to establish a Hasidic following, Deutsch opened and operated the Living Torah Museum in Boro Park, Brooklyn. Deutsch also runs a food charity called Oneg Shabbos.

== Biography ==
Shaul Shimon Deutsch was ordained as a rabbi in a Lubavitch institution and married to Pe'er Deutsch. They have five children. Deutsch is the Rebbe of Anshei-Liozna, a Chasidic court that is centered in Boro Park, Brooklyn. He has been the Liozna Rebbe since 1995. The group appointed him their Rebbe at their synagogue on 45th Street in Brooklyn. He took the name of the town of Liozna in Belarus (where the early Chabad movement was founded).

The cause for Deutsch's break from Chabad is also attributed to a biography he wrote covering the early life of Rabbi Menachem Mendel Schneerson, the Seventh Rebbe of Chabad. Deutsch's work, despite its lack of professional editing was viewed as groundbreaking for dispelling myths held by Chabad community members concerning the Seventh Rebbe's life.

Deutsch's communal activities include:

- Living Torah Museum — Deutsch's museum, the Living Torah Museum is based out of two conjoined row houses on 41st Street in Boro Park, Brooklyn. The museum's collection includes hundreds of taxidermy animals referenced in the bible.
- Oneg Shabbos — Deutsch also runs a food charity, Oneg Shabbos, that feeds more than 1,000 poor people each week, with dozens of volunteers. The charity distributes $5.5 million of food annually.

=== Allegations of theft and fraud ===
Deutsch has been involved in several claims of impropriety regarding his dealings with historical artifacts. Allegations concern potential theft, fraud and forgery involving items purchased by Deutsch or items he put up for auction.

- In 2008, Deutsch was accused by an Israeli antiquities dealer of theft after an alleged reneging of full payment for an ancient artifact.
- In 2019, the museum owner was sued for auctioning an artifact without the owner's permission.
- In 2022, Chabad community websites alleged that Deutsch forged artifacts and permission notes from Chana Gurary, the daughter of Joseph Isaac Schneersohn.

=== Books ===
- Larger than life: The life and Times of the Lubavitcher Rebbe Rabbi Menachem Mendel Schneersohn (Volume 1), Shaul Shimon Deutsch, ~ Chasidic Historical Productions 1995 ~ ISBN 0-9647243-0-8
- Larger than life: The life and Times of the Lubavitcher Rebbe Rabbi Menachem Mendel Schneersohn (Volume 2), Shaul Shimon Deutsch, ~ Chasidic Historical Productions 1997 ~ ISBN 0-9647243-1-6
