= Liadi (Hasidic dynasty) =

Branch of the Chabad movement

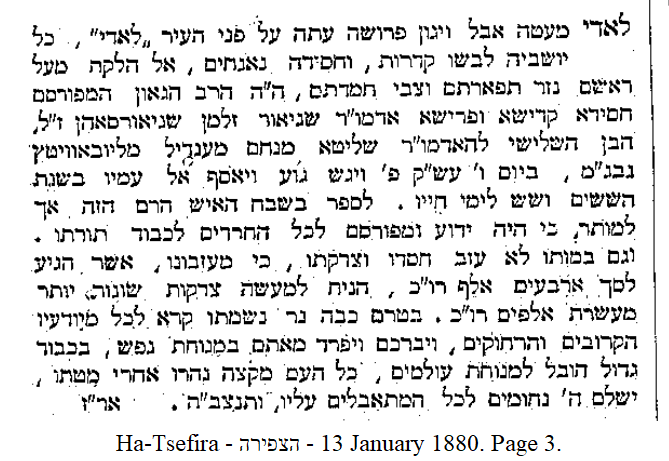
Notice of the Death of Liadi Rebbe Chaim Shneur Zalman Schneersohn. Ha-Tsefira. 1880-01-13. p3.

The Liadi branch of the Chabad Hasidic movement was founded after the death of the third rebbe of Chabad, Rabbi Menachem Mendel Schneersohn. The group was one of several that sought to succeed Rabbi Menachem Mendel, whose death created a dispute over his succession. The group was led by its founder, Rabbi Chaim Schneur Zalman, a son of Rabbi Menachem Mendel.

== A branch of Chabad ==
After the death of Rabbi Menachem Mendel Schneersohn, several of his sons independently assumed the role of rebbe. Rabbi Chaim Schneur Zalman assumed the role of rebbe in the town of Liadi, the same town his great-grandfather, Rabbi Shneur Zalman of Liadi (the first rebbe of Chabad-Lubavitch), was rebbe. Rabbi Chaim Schneur Zalman was succeeded by his son, Rabbi Yitzchak Dovber. Yitzchak Dovber's brother-in-law, Rabbi Levi Yitzchak became a rebbe in the town of Sirotin (Siratshin). He and his brother-in-law died without a successor, thus ending the Liadi dynasty.
