= Haim Raphael HaLevi ben Aaron of Staroselye =

- Title: Strashelye Rebbe

Personal life
- Born: Haim Raphael ha-Levi ben Aaron

Religious life
- Religion: Judaism

Jewish leader
- Predecessor: Aaron HaLevi ben Moses of Staroselye
- Successor: None

Haim Raphael HaLevi ben Aaron of Staroselye (died 1842) was the second and last rebbe of the Strashelye movement, an extinct branch of the Chabad school of Hasidic Judaism. The branch is named Strashelye after the town in the Mohilev Province of present-day Belarus where its leader lived. Like all Hasidim it is based on the teachings and customs of Chasidut as taught by the Baal Shem Tov, in turn based on the Kabbalistic works of Rabbi Isaac Luria (also known as the Arizal). Rabbi Haim's father was Aaron HaLevi ben Moses of Staroselye, a disciple of Rabbi Shneur Zalman of Liadi and a friend of Rabbi Dovber Schneuri.
