= Aaron HaLevi ben Moses of Staroselye =

Aaron HaLevi ben Moses (Hurwitz) of Staroselye (1766-1828) was a Talmudic scholar and Kabbalist of note who lived in Poland during the latter part of the eighteenth century and the early part of the nineteenth.

== Student of Rabbi Shneur Zalman of Liadi ==
He was one of the most enthusiastic and steadfast disciples of the kabbalist Shneur Zalman of Liadi, rabbi of Liozna and Liadi, and studied under him until he had acquired a full knowledge of his mystic lore. He urged Rabbi Shneur Zalman to publish his work, Tanya (Slavita, 1796); and when the latter was imprisoned by a royal decree in 1798, Aaron traveled from town to town to collect money from his master's followers, to ransom him, or at least to bribe the jailer and the prison warders to allow them to see Rabbi Shneur Zalman. After the latter's death in 1812, Aaron took up his residence as rabbi at Staroselye, and many flocked to him to have the Law explained in accordance with the teachings of his master. These formed a school known as the Hasidim of Staroselye.

== Works ==
Aaron was the author of Sha'are Abodah (Hebrew: שערי עבודה, The Gates of Worship), Shklov, 1820–21, a work which is also known by the name Avodat HaBenonim (עבודת הבינונים, The Worship of the Average men). It is divided into five sections: the first on the unity of God; the second on the union of souls; the third on divine service; the fourth on the Law and the Commandments; and the fifth on repentance. He also wrote Avodat HaLevi (עבודת הלוי), Lemberg, 1861, a commentary on the Pentateuch. All of Aaron's teachings are based on the oral traditions of Rabbi Shneur Zalman and on his work, Tanya.

== Family ==
Rabbi Aaron was a descendant of Rabbi Isaiah Horowitz (Shaloh HaKadosh). Rabbi Aaron's son, Haim Raphael HaLevi ben Aaron of Staroselye, was the second rebbe of Strashelye.

Michael Levi Rodkinson, an early Hasidic historiographer was Aaron's grandson.
