= Strashelye (Hasidic dynasty) =

Branch of the Chabad movement

Strashelye was a branch of the Chabad school of Hasidic Judaism, named after the town Strashelye (Starasel'lye) in the Mohilev Province of present-day Belarus, where its leader lived. Like all Hasidism it is based on the teachings and customs of Chasidut as taught by the Baal Shem Tov, in turn based on the Kabbalistic works of Rabbi Isaac Luria (also known as the Arizal).

== The first Rebbe ==
The first Rebbe of Strashelye was Rabbi Aharon HaLevi Horowitz, a student of Rabbi Shneur Zalman of Liadi (1745–1812), the founder of the Chabad Chassidic school of thought.

=== Rabbi Aaron and the second Rebbe of Chabad-Lubavitch ===
While both Strashelye and Lubavitch considered Rabbi Shneur Zalman to have been the first rebbe of their respective schools, the former considered Rabbi Aharon HaLevi Horowitz to be his successor. The latter consider Rabbi Dovber Schneuri (the oldest son of Rabbi Schneur Zalman) the second rebbe. In as much as that is the case, the Strashelye branch of Chabad Chassidus began in 1812, when Rabbi Shneur Zalman died.

==== Disagreement over prayer ====
While both were good friends, Rabbi Dovber and Rabbi Aharon disagreed about the emphasis on, and correct method of, emotional expression in Chassidic prayer. According to Rabbi Dovber, the greatest service a Jew can perform in worship is to totally nullify himself before The Creator. Therefore, maintained Rabbi Dovber, a person's meditation can appear to be cold and emotionless on the exterior, where the prayer causes the person praying to feel oneself one with The Creator. To that end, Rabbi Dovber prayed with great D'veikus (cleaving), rather than with Hispaylus (excitement), where the one praying gets excited over the Creator but remains, in his own feeling and understanding, a separate entity and existence. Rabbi Dovber prayed while perfectly still, hardly moving. His outward countenance remained completely unaffected. This mode of davening was something personal to him, as he was able to conceal his emotions, rather than something he recommended for everyone. When the Rebbe DovBer noticed that his chassidim (followers) thought that they should be devoid of any emotional appearance, he wrote a public letter stating that this is wrong. His disagreement with Rabbi Aharon was rather that he felt that there must be an understanding of Godliness and a cleaving, in other words that one's emotional feeling be a lasting one, not one that would evaporate after a short time.

Rabbi Aharon disagreed, maintaining that it is acceptable and even commendable for a Chassid to become outwardly excited during prayer. Rabbi Shneur Zalman himself was known to pound his fist so hard on the wall while praying that he sometimes literally bled from his hand. Rabbi Aharon displayed similar excitement and intensity during prayer. Moreover, he encouraged others to similarly express themselves openly during prayer.

==== Disagreement over education ====
Furthermore, the two disagreed about the extent to which the deepest elements of Chassidic wisdom should be taught openly. Rabbi Dovber, in his magnum opus Sha'ar HaYichud (The Gate of Unity), explains the entire spiritual superstructure of creation. Rabbi Aharon, on the other hand, argued that it was dangerous to discuss certain aspects of creation because it could lead a person to inadvertently view God anthropomorphically. Therefore, it is merely enough for a person to know that God is so great that His Existence precludes the existence of any created beings, but that created beings exist, nonetheless. This very paradox is a testimony to the greatness of God. While Rabbi Aharon's teachings involve some of the deepest aspects of Kabbalistic wisdom, they nonetheless entreat the reader to use the deep intellectual wisdom of Kabbala in order to inspire simple love and fear for God. This was the foundation of Rabbi Dovber's doctrine as well, and in fact a cornerstone in Rabbi Shneur Zalman's own Tanya. The difference lay primarily in the outer (Chitzonius) emotional conduct Rabbi Aharon expected of his followers, and the intense manifestation of self-effacement Rabbi Dovber expected of his.

==== Succession ====
At some point before Rabbi Shneur Zalman's passing, Rabbi Dovber and Rabbi Aharon had a disagreement. It is not known what the disagreement was about. What is known is that Rabbi Aharon left Liadi (where both he, Rabbi Shneur Zalman and Rabbi Dovber lived), and settled in his home town of Strashelye. After Rabbi Shneur Zalman died, Rabbi Dovber moved to the city of Lubavitch. Seeking to become the leader of the Chabad school, Rabbi Dovber became the Rebbe of the Lubavitch school of Chabad Chassidus. Rabbi Aharon, similarly seeking to be the leader of the Chabad school, became the Rebbe of the Strashelye school of Chabad Chassidus. The two competing schools held strongly to the ideological distinctions between their leaders.

=== Works ===
Rabbi Aharon's two books were based on Rabbi Shneur Zalman's magnum opus, Tanya. Rabbi Aharon's first book, Sha'arei HaYichud ve'Ha'emuna (The Gates of Unity and Faith), is based on the section of Tanya of a similar name. In it, Rabbi Aharon argues that the corresponding part of Tanya was incomplete, and that it is therefore necessary to learn his book in order to understand it fully. Sha'arei HaYichud v'HaEmuna focuses on the creation of the universe, and the universe's relationship with God. It develops the concept of pele (wonder), which refers to the paradox caused by God's and the universe's simultaneous existence. It then argues that one will never "understand" God, because God is incomparable with created existence. Therefore, the closest thing man can come to "grasping" God is to meditate on the pele, and to constantly desire to understand God further. The book further elaborates on the relationship between the universe, God, and the Ten Sefiros.

The second of his books is called Sha'arei HaAvoda (The Gates of Divine Service). It is based on the first book of Tanya, which outlines the specific divine service of the Beinoni (the "Average Man"; see the article on Tanya). It was in this book, and in Avodas HaLevi, that Rabbi Aharon systematized his approach to divine service: Rabbi Aharon emphasized the importance of heartfelt emotions as a tool of connecting with the Divine. He argued that, contrary to Rabbi Dovber Schneuri's position, cold and intellectual contemplation cannot lead to true self-nullification. Only by openly and emotionally desiring to cleave to God can one attain something approaching nullification before the Infinite (the highest goal of Chabad Chassidism). Rabbi Dovber, by contrast, called that approach a glorification of the self.

Rabbi Aharon's students compiled many of the oral discourses that Rabbi Aharon gave, and some of the discourses that he either wrote himself or transcribed from discourses given by Rabbi Shneur Zalman. That compilation is called Avodas HaLevi.

While his books are not commonly studied within Chabad circles today, they are widely respected for their scholarly insights and broad scope. Furthermore, the Toldos Avraham Yitzchak Rebbe instructed his Chassidim to study Rabbi Aharon's books. The discourses constitute explanations of passages in the Torah, or concepts in Torah thought, in the light of his Chassidic outlook.

== The second Rebbe ==
After Rabbi Aharon died, his son, Rabbi Haim Raphael HaLevi ben Aaron of Staroselye (d. 1842), became rebbe in his place. However, the dynasty did not last into the next generation. Most chassidim of the Strashelye returned to Chabad-Lubavitch in the third generation, accepting Menachem Mendel Schneersohn as their rebbe.

== See also ==
- List of Hasidic dynasties
