= Havatzelet =

Hebrew-language newspaper

Havazelet
- Mevaseret Zion
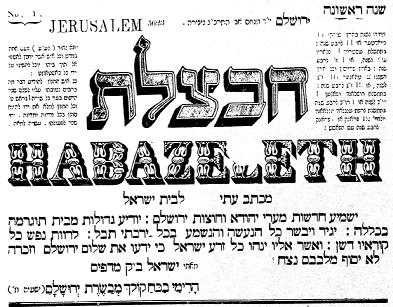
- First issue of Havatzelet, July 3, 1863
- Owner: Israel Dov Frumkin
- Founder: Yisrael Bak
- Editor: Eliezer Ben-Yehuda (1882–1883); Yaakov Goldman
- Founded: July 3, 1863; 163 years ago
- Ceased publication: 1911; 115 years ago
- Political alignment: Hasidic
- Language: Hebrew
- City: Jerusalem
- Free online archives: www.nli.org.il/en/newspapers/hzt

Havatzelet (also rendered as Habazeleth; Hebrew: חבצלת, romanized: Chavatzeles, lit. 'The lily') was a Hebrew-language periodical journal published in Jerusalem in 1863 to 1882 by Yisrael Bak, and again from 1870 to 1911 under the editorship of his son-in-law, Israel Dov Frumkin, both members of the Old Yishuv Hasidic community, which was published around twice a month.

Regular contributors to the paper included Abraham Moses Luncz, Salomon Buber, and Avrom Ber Gotlober, some of whom sent articles from abroad to be published.

== First publication ==
The newspaper was primarily concerned with affairs and news in the city of Jerusalem, and was founded as a competitor to HaLevanon, which was the newspaper for the Perushim of the time, while Havatzelet was influenced by Hasidic thought and some Sephardic Jewish thought. Each newspaper had a section dedicated to the settlement of Eretz Yisroel by Jewish immigrants. It ceased printing after its fifth issue in 1864, at the same time as the closure of HaLevanon, and was renewed again in 1870.

== Second publication ==
After its revival in 1870, the slogan Mevaseret Zion (Hebrew: מבשרת ציון, lit. 'Herald of Zion'), was added above the main headline, and in October 1871, at the beginning of its second year, it became a weekly publication. The newspaper sought to promote a sense of prosperity in order to attract settlers to the then-Ottoman Palestine, including publications of travel stories by Yehoshua Yellin, which began starting in issue 19 of 1871, as well as articles by Rabbi Judah Alkalai, who promoted the idea that it was a mitzvah to make Aliyah. The paper also featured attacks against Rabbi Aharon Yehuda Leib Horowitz, who encouraged Jews to immigrate to the United States. All printed material was under the editorship of Frumkin and his opinions.

In 1882, Eliezer Ben-Yehuda became the executive editor of the paper, which he had agreed to do under the condition that Frumkin provide lodgings for him and his fiancée, Dvora, and from then until 1883, the newspaper (with Ben-Yehuda as a foreign correspondent) fought against Alliance Israélite Universelle, as well as the officials of Edmond James de Rothschild, who, in Ben-Yehuda's opinion, were slowing the development of the Jewish community in Ottoman Palestine. He was a staunch proponent of the revival of the Hebrew language, as was the paper's editorial staff. In 1883, Frumkin appointed Yaakov Goldman as editor, and Ben-Yehuda went to edit HaZvi, causing a more moderate political view from Havetzalet.

Some writers that joined following Goldman's appointment included Eleazar Rokach, Bak's grandson, Naftali Herz Imber, the author of Hatikvah, Avraham Orenstein, David Yellin, Raphael Meir Panigel, the Rishon LeZion, Yechiel Michel Pines, Yosef Rivlin, and Simon Bacher, among others.

Following the decline of the newspaper's popularity, many other newspapers in the region popped up, including Moriah, and Do'ar HaYom. On March 9, 1911, the Havatzelet newspaper ceased publication. The Frumkin Press was sold and eventually acquired by Eliezer Gruber, son of the newspaper’s head printer, Yehuda 'Yuda' Gruber. Eliezer renamed the press Sinai, which survived another 50 years in the Shlomo Feingold on Jaffa Street.

=== Controversies ===
In 1883, the newspaper published an article, "An American and yet a Despot", directed towards American minister to the Ottoman Empire, Lew Wallace. This criticism lead to a freeze on publication and Frumkin was subsequently jailed for 45 days by Ottoman officials, on account of his criticism of the government. The incident stemmed from a disturbance regarding "hooligans" breaking into a prayer service at the Western Wall on Tisha B'Av, and international reaction to the ensuing squabble.

== Cultural influence ==
Havatzelet, also the name of its printing house, was established with funds provided by Moses Montefiore as part of his productivity program. It was used, among other things, as an advertisement for the printing house, which was located on the flagship street in the Muslim Quarter of Jerusalem, which was known as the Havatzelet Courtyard, which was temporarily the home of Ben-Yehuda.

It was the first Hebrew language newspaper to be printed in the region for more than 40 years. A street in the center of Jerusalem, near Zion Square, Havatzelet Street, is named after it.
