= Siddur Im Dach =

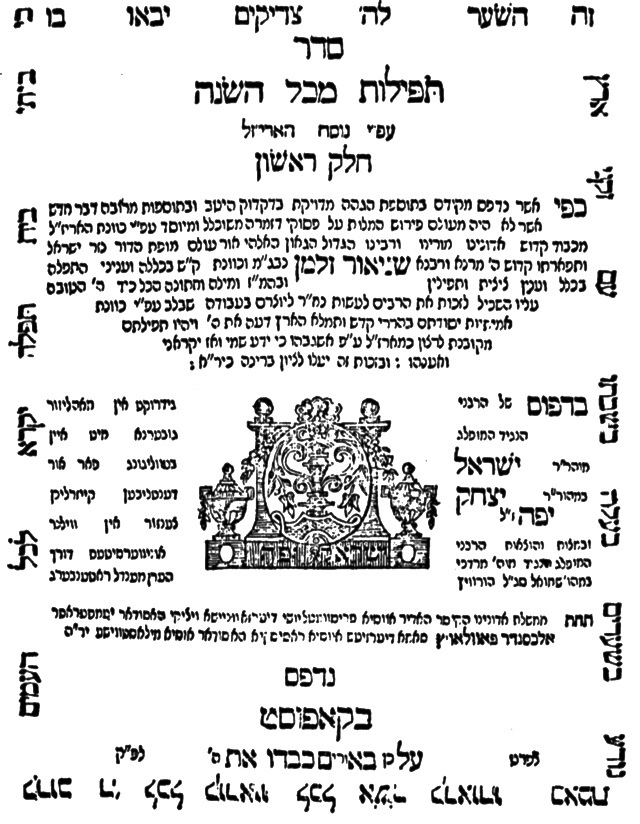
- Title page of first edition of Siddur Im Dach
- Author: Rabbi Schneur Zalman of Liadi
- Language: Hebrew
- Published: Kopust, 1816; Kehot Publication Society, Brooklyn, New York, 1965
- Media type: Print

Siddur Im Dach (Hebrew: סידור עם דא״ח) is a Hasidic prayer book written by Rabbi Schneur Zalman of Liadi, the first Rebbe of the Chabad-Lubavitch movement. Accompanying the prayers are Hasidic discourses written by Rabbi Schneur Zalman.

The work was originally titled Siddur Tefillos MiKol HaShanah Al Pi Nussach HaAriZal, however it is commonly known by shorter titles such as Siddur Tefillos MiKol HaShanah, Siddur Im Dach and The Alter Rebbe's Siddur.

In the Chabad community, the Siddur refers to the standard prayerbook while Siddur Im Dach refers to the prayerbook with accompanying Hasidic discourses.

== Publication ==
The book was prepared for publication by the third Chabad Rebbe, Rabbi Menachem Mendel Schneersohn. The work was republished by the central Chabad publishing house, Kehot Publication Society, in 1965. republished in 2019 as a two volume set

== Teachings ==
Siddur Im Dach contains numerous Hasidic interpretations of the Jewish prayers as well as discourses on Chabad philosophy. The work also contains a number of rulings and customs as to the exact order and verses of Jewish prayer. According to the seventh Chabad Rebbe, Rabbi Menachem Mendel Schneerson, the laws and customs as printed in Siddur Im Dach are the most authoritative of all of Rabbi Schneur Zalman's works including the Shulchan Aruch HaRav, the code of Jewish law written by the first Rebbe. Rabbi Menachem Mendel stated that the reasoning behind this stance is due to the fact that Siddur Im Dach was compiled after Rabbi Schneur Zalman's other works.

"Nothing useful for Divine Service is derived from sadness at all; it only causes one to be inanimate like a stone..." (Siddur Im Dach. p. 31a.)

== See also ==
- Siddur
- Chabad philosophy
- Tehillat Hashem
- Nusach Ari § Siddurim Adapted from the AriZal's Siddur
- Siddur § Hasidic or Nusach Sefard Siddurim
