= Botsina =

Botsina (Aramaic: בוצינא, also spelled buzina, botzina, and occasionally erroneously as botsitsa) means lantern, lamp, torch, or spark in Aramaic. Often in Jewish sources it refers to causes of spiritual enlightenment.

== Use in Jewish mysticism ==
The initial essay in the Zohar, known by its initial Aramaic words Bereish Hormanuta D'malka (Aramaic: בריש הורמנותא דמלכא, lit. "at the beginning of the King's will"), uses the phrase botsina dikardinuta (Aramaic: בוצינא דקרדינותא) to describe what is explained in early Lurianic texts as an "explosion within thought". This phrase is associated in various streams of Jewish mystical thought, however particularly in Hasidism, with the kav hamidah.

Pinchas Giller devotes a section of Reading the Zohar: the sacred text of the Kabbalah to the phrase, calling it "the boldest image of the Hormanuta literature". Yehuda Liebes writes that "ambiguities of meaning are typical in the Zohar, and the word bostina (spark) illustrates this well".

== As a descriptive term for Torah sages ==
Rabbi Shimon Bar Yochai, traditionally the author of the Zohar, is referred to as botsina kadisha (Aramaic: בוצינא קדישא, lit. "the holy lantern"). The Arizal is referred to as botsina kadisha in the books of his disciple Rabbi Chaim Vital, as is the Alter Rebbe of Chabad in the opening of his book Likkutei Torah.

== See also ==
- Kabbalah
- Zohar
- Shimon bar Yochai
- Judeo-Aramaic languages
