= Tehillat Hashem =

Chabad prayer book

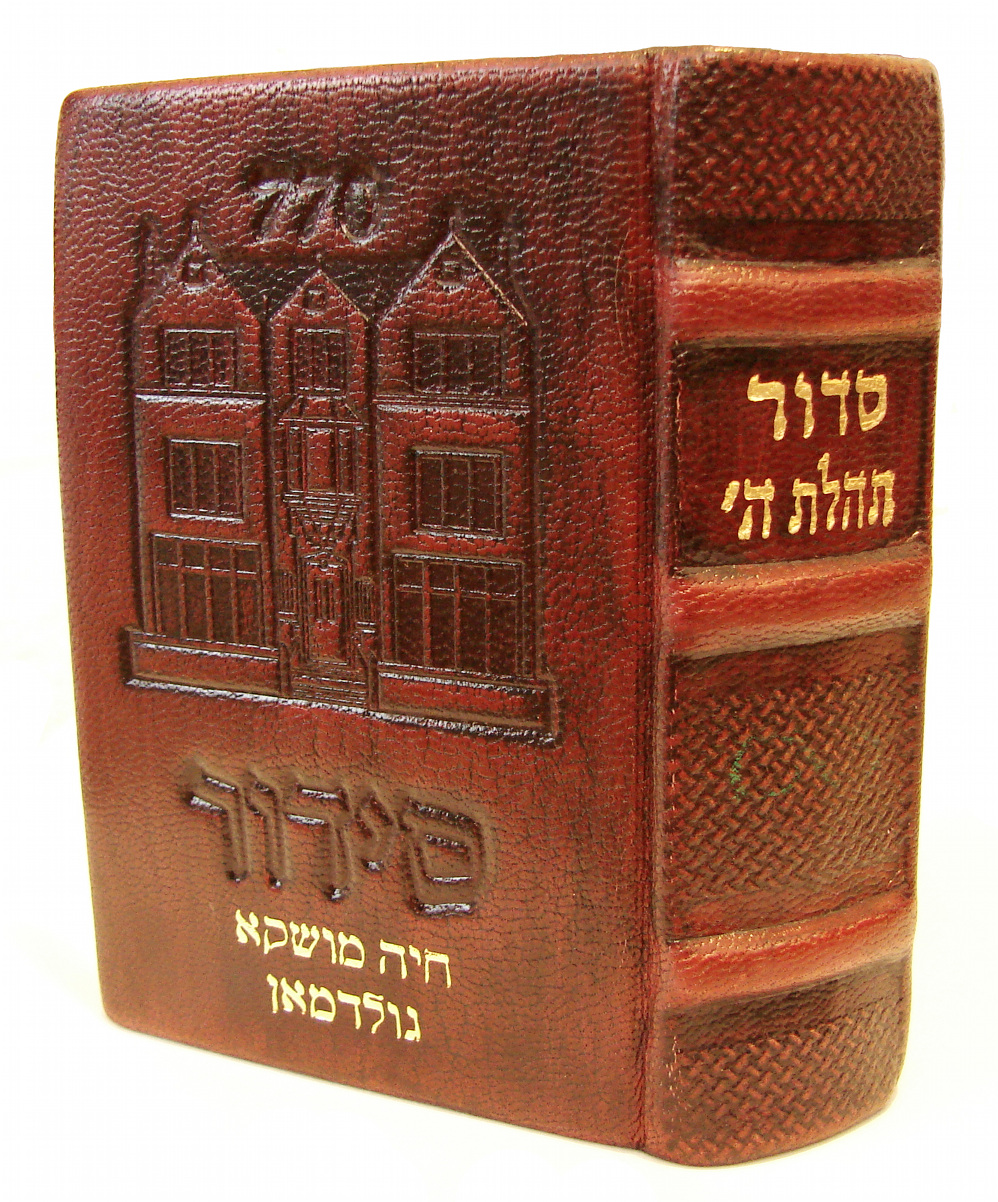
Leather bound version with "770" embossed.

Tehillat Hashem (תְּהִלַּת ה', "praise of God" in Hebrew) is the name of a siddur, prayer-book, used for Jewish services in synagogues - and privately - by Hasidic Jews, specifically in the Chabad-Lubavitch community. It follows the Nusach Ari prayer rite. The name of the siddur is taken from Psalm 145, verse 21, "Praise of God shall my mouth speak, and all flesh shall bless His holy Name forever and ever." It is produced by the Kehot publishing house.

== History ==
Title page, 1896 edition of Siddur Torah Ohr.

The Tehillat Hashem Siddur is based on the Siddur Seder Ha'Avoda, printed in Vilna in 1851, and follows the teachings of Rabbi Isaac Luria (Nusach Ari as above) with corrections and additions from the Lubavitcher Rebbe, Rabbi Menachem Mendel Schneerson. The siddur also features extracts from the Shulchan Aruch HaRav relevant to certain rituals.

It is considered a variant of Siddur HaRav, or "Siddur Admor HaZakein", edited and published by Rabbi Shneur Zalman of Liadi (1745–1812) the founder of the Chabad-Lubavitch movement. It draws, further, on Siddur Torah Ohr, a later edition of Siddur Admor Hazakein. See Shneur Zalman of Liadi § Siddur.

In 1945, an enlarged, completed edition of this siddur was published by the Merkos L'Inyonei Chinuch in Brooklyn, New York for the use of Jewish school students. A Siddur also entitled Tehillas Hashem was published in Rostov-on-Don, Russia in 1918–1920.

== Glosses and corrections ==
Although the Lubavitcher Rebbe himself took great pains to prepare the Siddur, he wrote about a particular halakhah written in the Siddur that is incorrect, concluding : "The complete Siddur Tehilas Hashem is a photograph of a preceding siddur and there wasn't enough time to edit it as needed." For this reason many errors in the early editions have been corrected in the many new editions.

Following siddur Seder Ha'Avodah, as outlined, most of the names of Hashem in it are formed of two letter Yuds; see Names of God in Judaism. However, wherever the wording is completely different, it reproduces the wording of Siddur Torah Ohr, where the tetragrammaton is printed in its entirety.

After the first edition, when R. David Brawman printed the Siddur in 1947 in Munich, the Rebbe sent him glosses on the Siddur, but they did not materialize. Other glosses, 47 in number (they may be identical to the previous ones) were made in preparation for the 1966 edition, so the arrangement was printed in both regular and pocket format.

== English Translations ==
Tehillat Hashem Siddur was first translated to English by Rabbi Nissen Mangel and published in 1978. Later, another translation was made by Rabbi Eliyahu Touger in 2013, as well as a "Youth Translation" by an editorial team, published in 2012–2014.

== See also ==
- Siddur Im Dach
- Nusach Ari § Siddurim Adapted from the AriZal's Siddur
- Siddur § Hasidic or Nusach Sefard Siddurim
- Chitas
