= Moshe Schneersohn =

Moshe Schneersohn (also, Moshe Zalmonovitch or Moshe Shneuri, (allegedly) later Leon Yulievitz) (born c. 1784 - died before 1853) was the youngest son of the founder of Chabad-Lubavitch Hasidism, Rabbi Shneur Zalman of Liadi. He was a close student of his father, and served as rabbi of Ule, Belarus. According to some scholars he converted to Christianity and died in a St. Petersburg asylum. Other scholars point to the Church's investigation into the alleged conversion, and conclude that the conversion was staged, and the documents, forged.

== Life ==
The year of Moshe Schneersohn's birth is not clear. It is known that he married in 1797, and since all of his brothers married at 14 years of age, scholars assume that he was born around 1784. The sixth Lubavitcher Rebbe in his historical notes on the Chabad movement notes that he was born in 1784 in Liozna, but elsewhere writes that he was born in 1779.

In his early life, his father engaged tutors to teach him Torah, as well as secular subjects. He also taught Moshe himself.

It is alleged that when he was eight years old he started showing signs of mental infirmity. He received medical treatment, and from the scant information available, it appears that his illness alternated between remission and outbreak during his childhood. In 1801, his father took him for treatment with doctors in Vitebsk, St. Petersburg and Smolensk. However, this account is slightly problematic considering his later rabbinic position, and halachic writings (see below).

He married Shifra daughter of Rabbi Tzvi Hirsh of Ula, a town near Liadi. He went to live with his father-in-law in Ula and was soon appointed to the post of Rabbi in that town.

Moshe had an excellent memory, and while in Ula he authored a number of transcripts of Maamarim that he had heard from his father (as well as notations). Some of his transcripts are printed in Torah Or and Likutei Torah. Additionally, he wrote interpretations in Kabbalah and addressed Halachic queries to his famous nephew, Menachem Mendel Schneersohn.

He also signed with his brothers on the introductions to his father's Shulchan Aruch and the 1814 edition of the Tanya.

During Napoleon's invasion of Russia in 1812, his family fled from Liadi to the Russian interior. His father died as a result of the journey. Moshe did not go with them, instead traveling to Shklov. He was captured by the French Army and sentenced to death for espionage, but he was pardoned. According to a letter allegedly written by his mother in 1817, he had been stable prior to this incident, but apparently this event took a toll on his mental health.

== Alleged conversion ==
Chabad and other scholars differ on Moshe's conversion and later life.

Recently, a trove of documents concerning Moshe was discovered in the national archive in Minsk by Shaul Stampfer. These documents taken at face value seem to indicate that Moshe willingly converted. This is the conclusion of David Assaf, who believes the conversion documents to be accurate and Moshe's intentions expressed in documents to be sincere. After the alleged conversion he changed his name to Leon Yulievitch. He returned to visit Lubavitch, but fled, ultimately dying in a mental institution in St. Petersburg.

Chabad scholars point to the Catholic Church's internal investigation into the conversion, the intent of Moshe, whether he was coerced or forced into signing his consent, and the actual conversion ceremony which involved many irregularities including that one of the witnesses denied witnessing the event. These scholars conclude that the documentation corroborates Moshe's brothers' letter which was discovered in the collection which indicates that the conversion documents were forged and Moshe was coerced to sign his intent. According to Chabad, the documents were forged, either by the Church, or later, by Chabad's opponents. in addition, the documents refer to him as "Moshe Schneersohn" even though that surname was only adopted later by his nephew Rabbi Menachem Mendel.

Rabbi Yosef Yitzchok Schneersohn in his talks, provides a tradition surrounding this incident. Moshe and his brother, the second Rebbe of Chabad, Dovber Schneuri were introduced to the Czar by the governor of Mogilev. Rabbi Moshe's tone towards the governor after the meeting offended the Archbishop of Smolensk who was present. They started discussing matters of religion and Moshe was challenged to a debate. Moshe reluctantly accepted the challenge, and won the debate. Furious, the Christians arrested Moshe, and imprisoned him in a church in Kiev. Moshe managed to escape from the church, and he traveled around Europe incognito on a self imposed "exile" until his death in 1878. According to one account, he lived toward the end of his life in the town of Radomisl, he refused to reveal his name, until a few months before his passing.

Moshe's escape took place on the night of the 19th of Kislev, 5576/1815 [exactly 27 years after his father's miraculous liberation]. The documentation of his conversion post date this incident by several years.

This story is cited by contemporary Chabad sources.

== Bibliography ==
- Neehaz ba-Svakh: Pirkei Mashber u-Mevucha be-Toldot ha-Hasidut, David Assaf, Zalman Shazar Institute, Jerusalem 2006
- David Assaf (2010). Untold Tales of the Hasidim. Translated by Dena Ordan. Waltham: Brandeis University Press.
- Days in Chabad, Yosef Y. Kaminetzky
