= Solomon Hanau =

German Jewish grammarian and textual critic

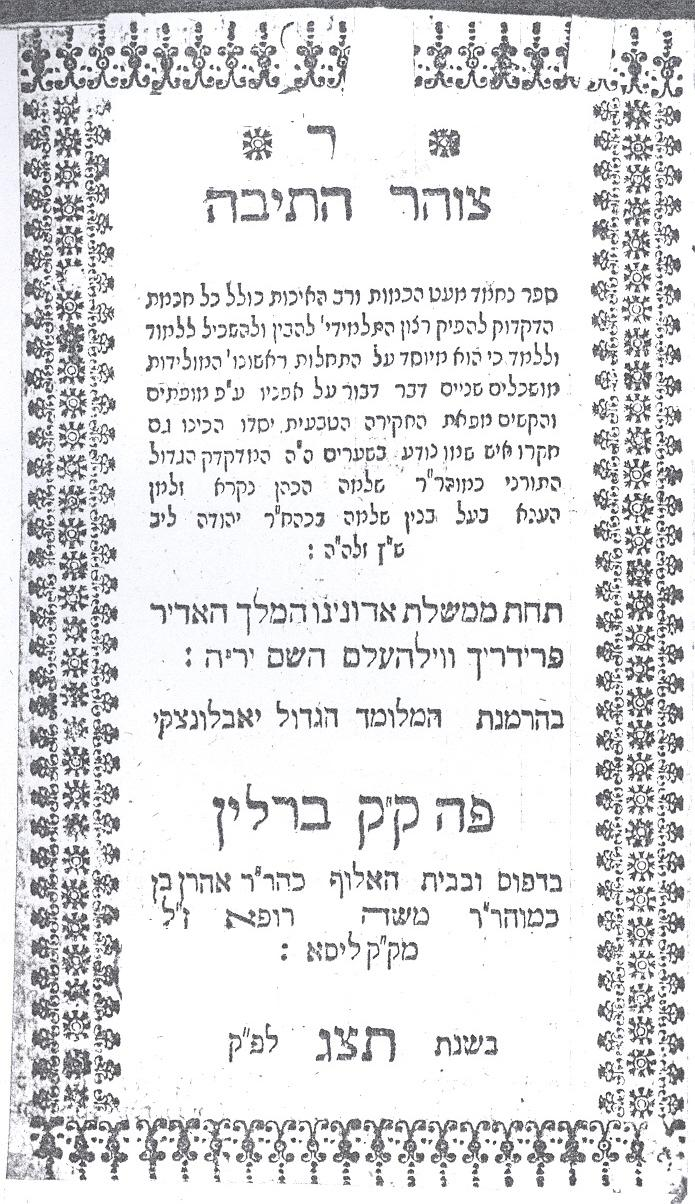
Tell "window box", Berlin Ttz"g 1733

Solomon Zalman ben Judah Loeb ha-Kohen Hanau (later known by the acronym Raza"h or Zalman Hanau or Zalman Henna (1687–1746), was a German Jewish expert in Hebrew grammar and critical textual critic of Jewish liturgy and prayer nussach.

== Birthplace ==
Shlomo (Zalman) ben Yehuda Leib Katz was born in Hanau (also known as Henna), Germany and lived in part in Frankfurt, Hamburg, Amsterdam, Berlin and Hanover. At the age of 21 he composed his first dikduk work, "Binyan Shlomo". He was fiercely criticized by Jacob Emden, though Emden's father, Tzvi Ashkenazi, authored an approval letter to Hanau for his textual work. Recent study suggests that Shneur Zalman of Liadi followed many of Solomon's variations when composing his Chabad Nusach of Jewish prayer (Nusach Ari).

== Family ==
He had a son Simson b. Salomo who worked as a printer in Homburg vor der Höhe until 1730. He printed an edition of the Ma'assebuch in 1727.

== Hebrew works ==
- Binyan Shlomo (Frankfurt)
- Hateivah
- Sha'arei Tefillah, (The gates of prayer) (Isnitz)
- Baith Tfilah
- Nikkud basics (Amsterdam)
- Exchange Torah (Hamburg)
