= Nusach Ari =

Chabad term

Nusach Ari means, in a general sense, any prayer rite following the usages of Rabbi Isaac Luria, the AriZal, in the 16th century.

== History of the Siddur ==
Luria and his immediate disciples did not publish any siddur. His followers established several characteristic usages intended to be added to the existing Sephardic law and customs. After Luria died in 1572, there were various attempts, mostly by Sephardic communities, to publish a siddur containing the form of prayer he used, referred to as the Nusach Sefard. An example is the siddur of Shalom Sharabi. Many of these are still used by Sephardic Jews.

It was generally held—even by Luria himself—that every Jew is bound to observe the mitzvot (commandments of Judaism) by following the customs appropriate to his or her family origin: see Minhag. Initially, Luria taught that twelve gates of prayer exist, one for each of the 12 tribes of Israel, hence twelve nusachs for Jewish prayer ("nusachot ha-tefillah") emanated accordingly. In alteration of this concept, especially in 18th/19th-century Hassidism, the claim emerged that a superior Nusach Sefard would reach a believed "thirteenth gate" (Shaar ha-Kollel) in Heaven.

Prayer books containing some version of the Sephardic rite, as varied by the usages of the Ari, were in use in some Kabbalistic circles in the Ashkenazi world in preference to the traditional Ashkenazic rite. In particular, they became popular among the early Hasidim. These prayer books were often inconsistent with the AriZal's version, and served more as a teaching of the kavanot "meditations" and proper ways to pray rather than as an actual prayer book.

=== Alter Rebbe's edition ===
In the 18th century, Shneur Zalman of Liadi decided to undertake the task of compiling a prayer book which amalgamated Kabbalistic Hasidic teachings, including his own, with what he considered to be the most correct version of the Lurianic Sephardic rite. The difference can be seen when comparing Sephardi siddurim containing Lurianic usages with Hasidic versions. Shneur Zalman of Liadi is said to have researched approximately sixty different versions of siddurim to come to the most correct version of the liturgical text. In 1803 the Alter Rebbe had the siddur published, and it was released in two volumes to the public. The new siddur was reprinted three times within the first ten years.

While much of Shneur Zalman's siddur is based on the Nusach Ari, it was compiled based on rulings and compositions from various other sources. Shneur Zalman acknowledged this by entitling his work Al Pi Nusach Ari "according to the version of the Ari". It differs from the other versions of the AriZal's siddur by incorporating some features of the Ashkenazic rite. It also contains some meditations from the siddur of Shalom Sharabi, but very much condensed compared with the original.

Shneur Zalman's Siddur is still used by Chabad and the current edition is called the Siddur Tehillat Hashem.

=== Other versions ===
Many other siddurim based on AriZal's siddur are categorized as Nusach Sefard and used by Hasidic sects. For this reason, Mitnagdim disapproved of the adoption of these different rather recent 18th/19th-century devised customs by Ashkenazi Jews.

== Siddurim Adapted from the AriZal's Siddur ==
- Siddur Ha-AriZal by Rabbi Asher Margaliot of Brod
- Siddur Tefillah Yesharah (Siddur Radvil, later published with commentary Keter Nehorah, Berditchev)
- Siddur Tehillat HaShem by Rabbi Shneur Zalman of Liadi
- Siddur Torah Or (Rabbi Shneur Zalman of Liadi's original edition)
- Siddur Tefillot Mikol Hashanah
- Siddur Od Yosef Hai (Baghdadi rite)

== See also ==
- Solomon Hanau
