= Torah Or/Likutei Torah =

Compilation book of Chassidic treatises by Rabbi Shneur Zalman

- Author: Rabbi Shneur Zalman of Liadi, the first Rebbe of Chabad
- Language: Hebrew
- Genre: Jewish mysticism, Chabad philosophy
- Published: 1848-1851, Zhytomyr (Likutei Torah, first edition)

Torah Or/Likutei Torah is a compilation of Chassidic treatises, maamarim, by the first Chabad Rebbe, Rabbi Shneur Zalman of Liadi. The treatises are classic texts of Chabad philosophy arranged according to the Weekly Torah portion, and are studied regularly by Chabad Chassidim.

The work was published originally in two parts. The first part, Torah Or, was first printed in 5597 (1837) in Kopust, with treatises, most of them from 5556 (1796) through the end of 5572 (1812), covering Genesis and Exodus, the first two books of the Pentateuch, with several discourses on Shavuot and Pesach. The second half was published in Zhytomyr in 5608 (1848) under the title Likutei Torah, covering Leviticus, Numbers and Deuteronomy, the final three books of the Pentateuch, Song Of Songs, the festivals, Rosh Hashana and Yom Kippur. The content of Torah Or/Likkutei Torah on each parsha is affectionately known as "The Chassidishe Parsha" amongst Chabad Chassidim.

== Likutei Torah ==
The second volume of the work, Likutei Torah, was published by Rabbi Schneur Zalman's grandson, Rabbi Menachem Mendel Schneersohn, the third Rebbe of Chabad. It was printed in Zhytomyr, after informers had the government close the print shop in Kopust where Torah Or was printed. Despite initial reluctance, Rabbi Menachem Mendel published his grandfather's teachings together with his own brief notes on various treatises, after the Alter Rebbe, his grandfather, reportedly appeared to him and his three sons in a dream, asking them to publish the glosses and comments. Rabbi Shmuel Schneersohn told his son, Sholom Dovber, that "the maamarim which are printed in Likutei Torah were selected by my father (the Tzemach Tzedek) out of two thousand maamarim."

== The late Lubavitcher Rebbe's request to learn Torah Or/Likkutei Torah ==
In the years 1954, 1962, 1965, 1986, and 1991, the late Lubavitcher Rebbe requested that his Chassidim should complete the Torah Or/Likkutei Torah each year. Often, it was suggested to learn just the content relating to the weekly parsha (also known as "the Chassidishe Parsha") while in other instances he included the learning of the content on Shir HaShirim in this request. There were even a couple of occasions where his request to learn Likkutei Torah extended to every single Jew. Recently different audio/visual content has been produced in order to make the learning and completion of Torah Or/Likkutei Torah more accessible and attainable.

== Adapted English edition ==
An English adaptation of Likutei Torah/Torah Or by Rabbi Yitzchak Dovid Wagshul was released in 2007 and March 2014. The 2007 adapted English edition translates and elucidates selected treatises from Torah Or, and the 2014 edition includes treatises from Lekutei Torah.

Another English adaption of the Mamarim was published in 2016 by Rabbi Yaakov Goldstein, director of shulchanaruchharav.com. The Mamarim are not a direct translation of the Hebrew original, but rather a content summary of the Mamar. Each Parsha features a single selected Mamar from amongst the many Mamarim that are printed in the Hebrew original, giving the reader a taste and glimpse of the full content of this monumental work. The main goal is for the reader to receive the content knowledge of the most fundamental Mamarim written by the Alter Rebbe, and for him to be given the tools for how to implement this knowledge within his daily life. Each Mamar concludes with a lessons box that summarizes the practical life lessons that we can derive from the Mamar. Also included are interesting parables that we find easy to relate to and help us to digest the content being studied, and internalize it.
