= Shulchan Aruch HaRav =

Codification of halakha by Rabbi Shneur Zalman of Liadi

The Shulchan Aruch HaRav (Hebrew: שולחן ערוך הרב, lit. 'Shulchan Aruch of the Rabbi'; also romanized Shulkhan Arukh HaRav) is especially a record of prevailing halakha by Rabbi Shneur Zalman of Liadi (1745–1812), known during his lifetime as HaRav (Hebrew for "The Rabbi") and as the first Rebbe (Yiddish for "rabbi") of Chabad. Within the Chabad community the work is known as the Alter Rebbe's Shulchan Aruch.

== New edition of the Shulchan Aruch ==
Shneur Zalman was asked by his teacher, Rabbi Dovber of Mezeritch, to write an adjusted version of the Shulchan Aruch (1562 CE) of Rabbi Joseph Karo with reference to later commentaries, as well as subsequent responsa, for nascent Hassidism. The Shulchan Aruch (and its forerunner, the Beit Yosef) was written from the standpoint of Sephardi minhag. Shneur Zalman composed his updated and adapted Shulchan Aruch (c. 1800), so that Hassidic laymen would be able to study the corresponding Jewish law, and in an attempt to reference halakha (Jewish law) as it stood at his time and place. Aiming to avoid ambiguity or obscurity, the work references the common Hassidic halakha with its underlying reasoning. Chabad-hagiography has it that Shneur Zalman, whose works form the foundation of Chabad philosophy, finished the composition aged 20. Originally the work was intended to cover all of the topics addressed in the Shulchan Aruch of Rav Yosef Karo, however, most of the work was lost prior to publication with only Orach Chaim surviving intact, along with small fragments of Choshen Mishpat and Yoreh Deah.

== Influence ==
The Shulchan Aruch HaRav is today used by most Hasidim as their basis for daily practice. The work is broadly considered an authoritative halachic text, and is frequently cited by later authorities such as Rabbi Yisrael Meir Kagan in his Mishnah Berurah and the Ben Ish Chai of Rabbi Yosef Chaim of Baghdad, as well as in many contemporary responsa by leading halachic authorities of the nineteenth and twentieth centuries. Shulchan Aruch HaRav is also one of the three works on which Shlomo Ganzfried based his Kitzur Shulchan Aruch, the well-known precis of customary Ashkenazi Halakha.

Although widely accepted, the work was originally limited in printings. Much of the original text was destroyed in a fire in Lubavitch, and only parts of copies of the draft survived. Kehot Publication Society (2002) has recently begun publication of a Bilingual Edition; in this work notations appear whenever Shneur Zalman's rulings are at variance with those in Yosef Karo's Shulchan Aruch.

== Gallery ==
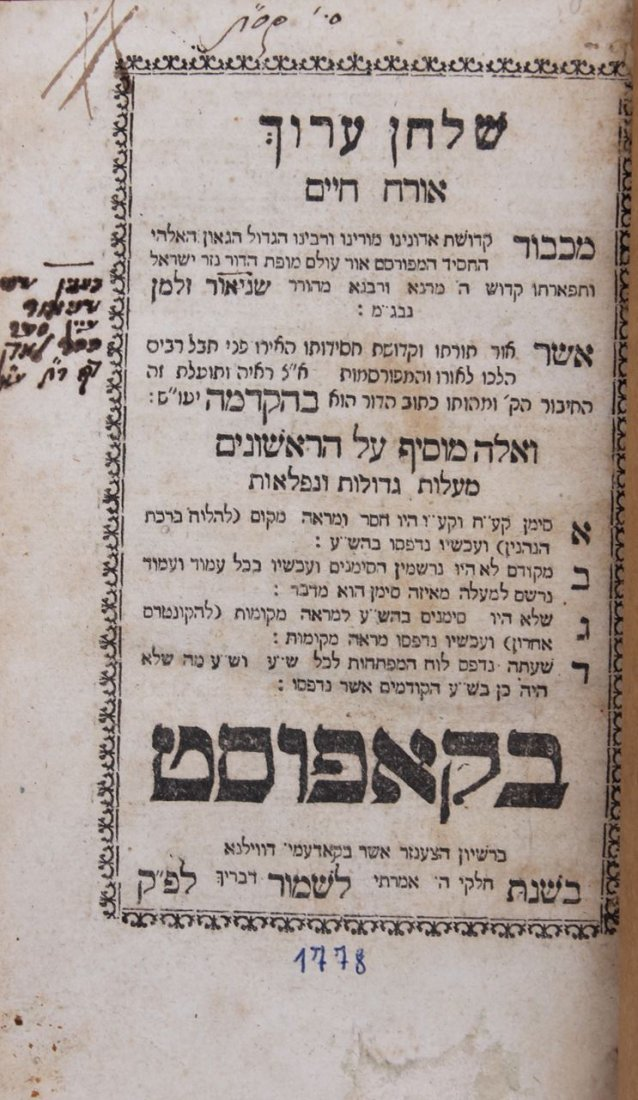
1816 edition, Kopys

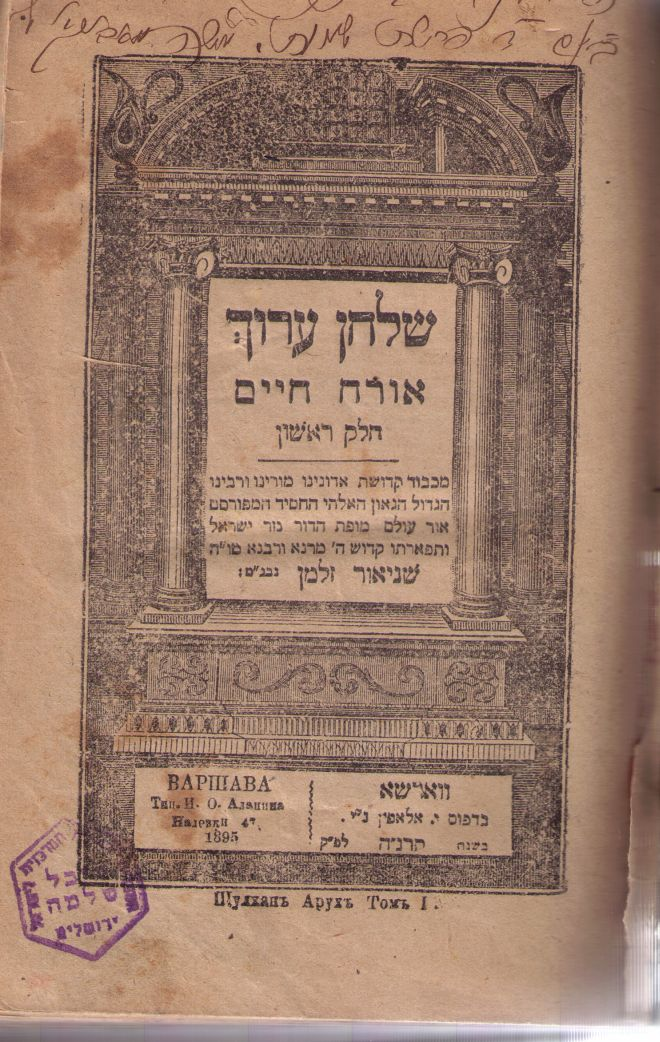
1875 edition, Warsaw

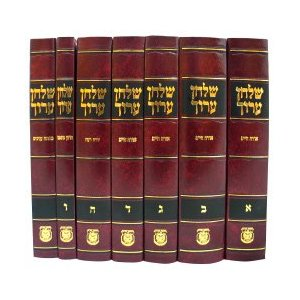
Contemporary set
