= Abraham Bär Flahm =

19th-century Jewish editor and publisher

Abraham Dov Bär ben David Flahm (Hebrew: אברהם דובערוש בן דוד פלאהם) was the editor and publisher of the Dubner Maggid.

== Work ==
After finding papers in a Mezritch synagogue left over by the Dubner Maggid 40 years before, including two letters from the Gaon of Vilna to the Maggid, Flahm began editing the writings. Following the Maggid's history he contacted the Maggid's son, and received permission to print his father's writings. The year of the first published book of his was depicted in Gematria as the "year of the flame" - pertaining to his family name which in German means flame.

For over 40 years he continued refining his works, while adding his own commentary, and prefaces with the history of the Maggid.

In 1886, four years after he began publishing, several different publishers "restored" the original parables, removing Flahm's remarks. Flahm put a notice in the yearly published Hagada that the original parables were extracted from unintelligible writings, and many times had parts needing completion which he himself had written. Following this letter, all published printings referring to the Maggid of Dubna added a reference to the original editor.

Originals of many of the first publishing of Flahm can be found at the Jewish National and University Library.

It is highly probable that Abraham Dov was family to the Maggid of Lutzk Rabbi Shlomo Flam, the teacher of the Grand Rabbi of Belz and the student of the Maggid of Mezritch.
