= Zusha of Hanipol =

Ukrainian rabbi

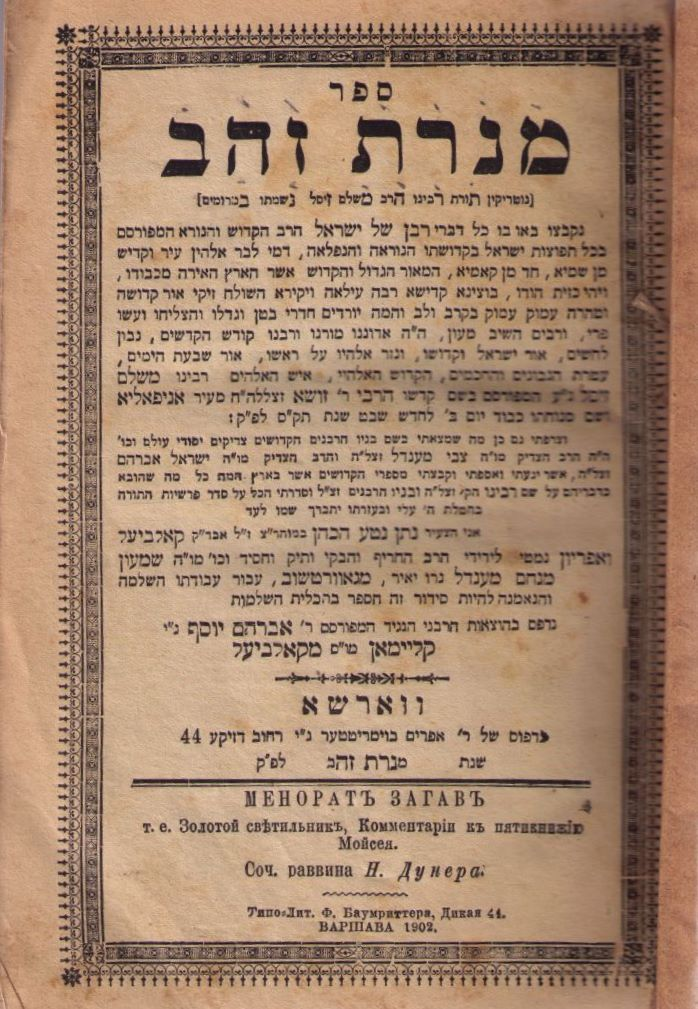
Book by Rabbi Zoussia of Anapoli, "Menorat Zahav" (Candelabra of Gold). Edition from 1902

Rabbi Meshulam Zusha of Hanipol or Meshulum Zusil of Anipoli (1718–1800), Reb Zusha, Reb Zushe, The Rebbe Reb Zusha (sometimes spelled Zushye, Zusil, Zoussia, Zušya, Zushya, Zushia, Zisha of Anipoli) was an early Hasidic luminary and well-known tzaddik. He was one of the great Hasidic Rebbes of the third generation and member of the academy circle of the Maggid of Mezeritch.

== Biography ==
Rabbi Zusha was the brother of Rebbe Elimelech of Lizhensk; Rabbi Elimelech was the elder by about 1 year. Both of them were born in the city of Tykocin (Podlaskie), to Reb Eliezer Lipa(e), who was the son of the great Torah scholar Rabbi Elimelech (whom Rebbe Elimelech was named after). Rabbi Meshulam Zusha was named after his mother's father, also a great Torah scholar.

Both Rabbi Zusha of Hanipol and Rabbi Elimelech of Lizhensk became prominent disciples of the holy Maggid of Mezeritch, part of his inner circle of students, known as the Chevraya Kadisha ("Holy Brotherhood"), together with other great tzaddikim such as Rabbi Nachum of Czernobyl, Rabbi Levi Yitzchok of Berditchev, Rabbi Aharon (HaGadol) of Karlin, Rabbi Shmuel (Shmelke) of Nikolsburg, Rabbi Menachem Mendel of Vitebsk, and Rabbi Shneur Zalman of Liadi.

Rabbi Zusha was known for his deep emotional approach towards prayer and his great piety.

He was one of the two rabbis, together with Reb Leib HaKohen, with whom Rabbi Shneur Zalman of Liadi consulted with before printing the Tanya in 1797. Both gave their approval.

Rabbi Zusha did not write any books, but his teachings were collected in the Menorat Zahav, based on the memories of his students.

== Death ==
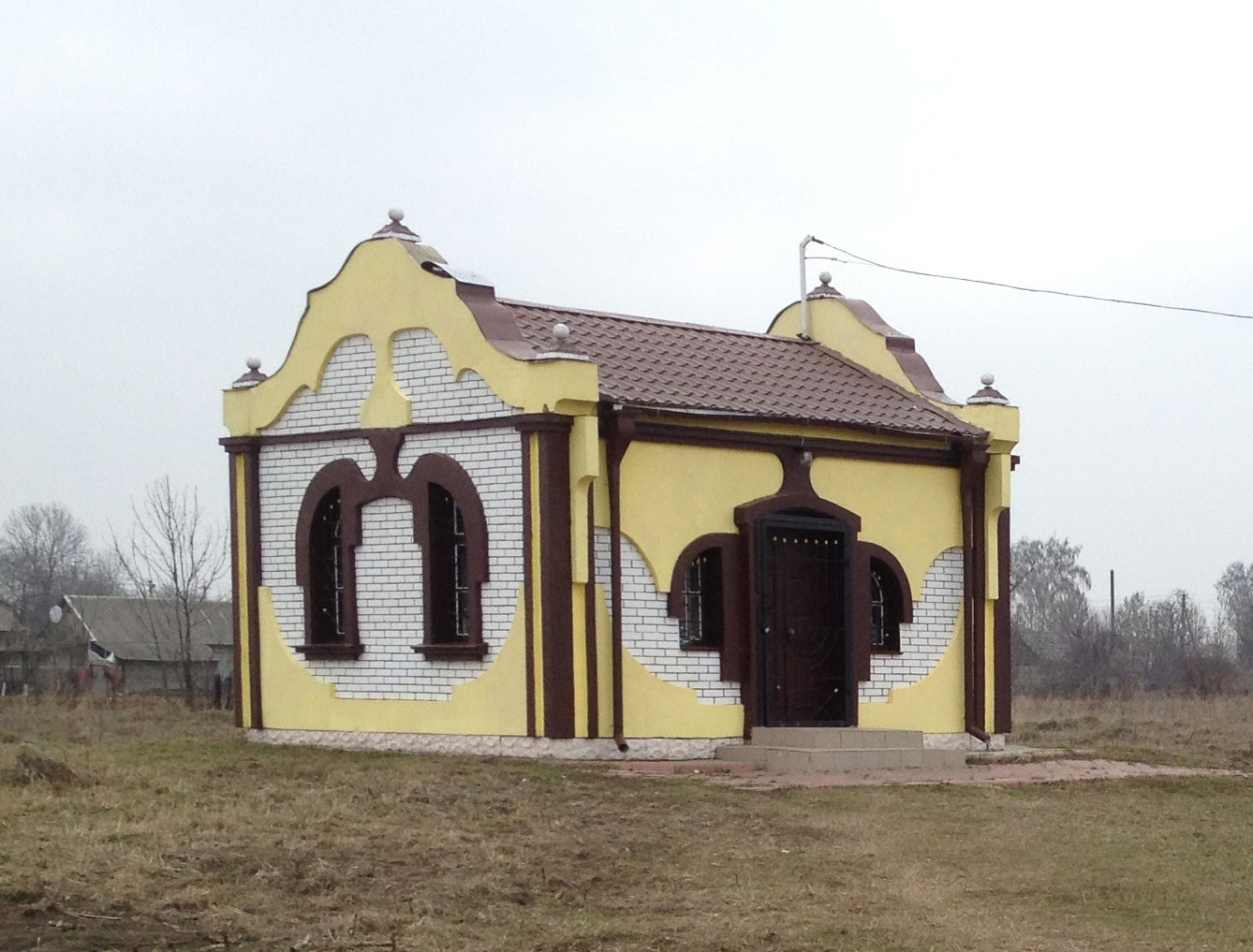
Mausoleum in Hannopil where he is buried

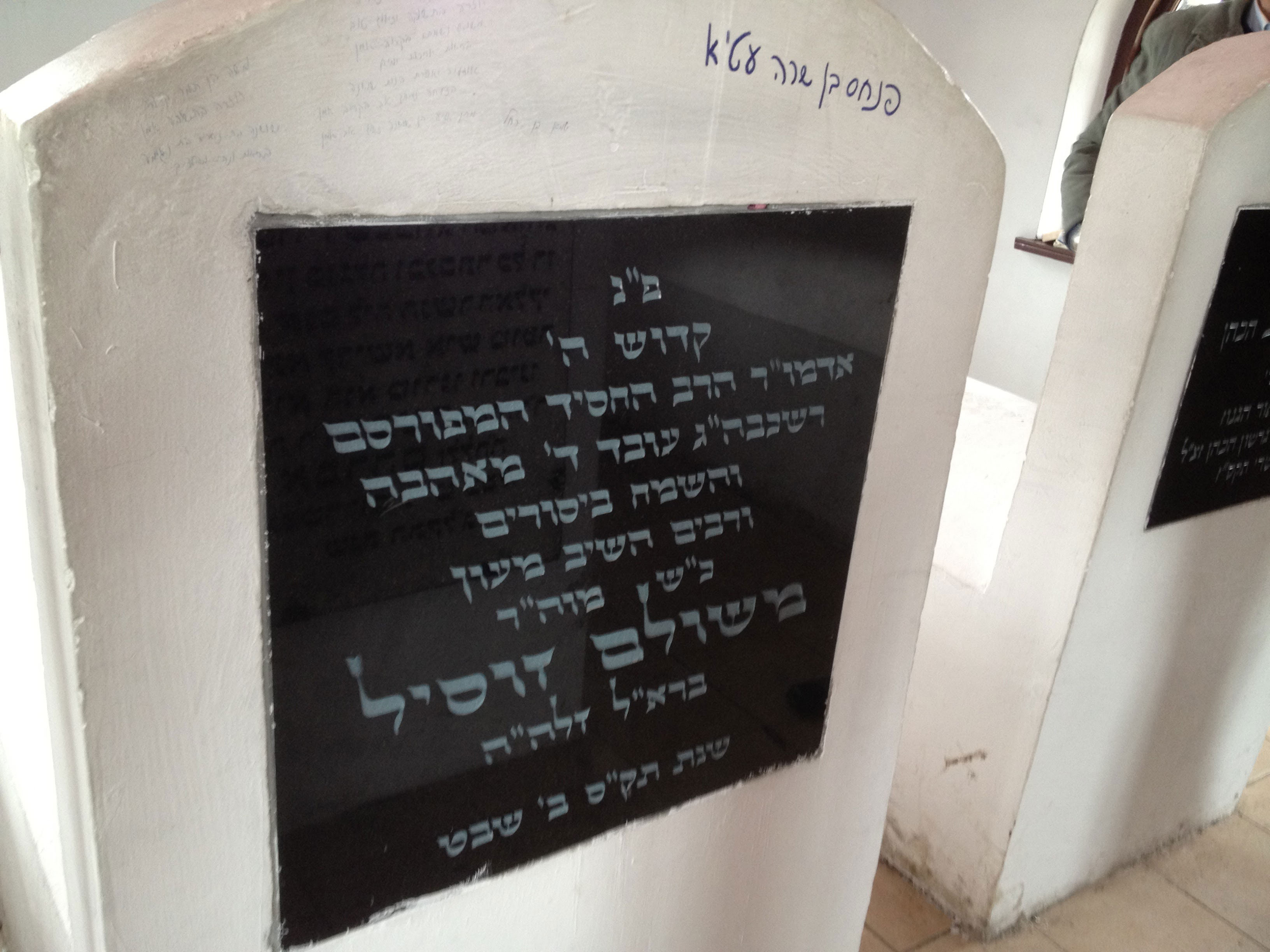

His Yahrtzeit is on 2 Shevat. He was buried beside his master and teacher, the Maggid of Mezeritch, in Hannopil.

He was succeeded by his son Rabbi Tzvi Menachem Mendel.

== Stories about Rabbi Zusha of Hanipol ==
Before Rabbi Zusha and his brother Rabbi Elimelech were born, their parents were childless for 10 years. Both their parents descended from Torah scholars, but because they became orphans at a very early age, both remained unlearned, simple but God-fearing Jews. The father was a water-carrier. Although he could have become a merchant, he preferred to live by the toil of his own hands. At first he had some rich customers, but then he exchanged them with another water-carrier in order to be able to supply the local synagogues with water. This meant a financial loss for him and he became poor. But as a reward for his good deed God blessed Reb Eliezer Lippa and his wife, who always readily supported her husband, with two sons, later to become great Tzaddikim. At first the children were physically weak, and although Reb Eliezer Lippa and his wife hired the best Torah teachers to teach them, they weren't making much progress. That grieved the parents, so they increased their prayers to God, often fasted and gave their meals to poor people as Tzedakah. God answered their sincere prayers and when the boys expressed their desire to go to a Yeshiva to continue their studies, they readily agreed. After their parents sent their sons to a yeshiva in another city, they took two poor Torah-students from Tarnow in their house in order to take care of them and support their studies. Reb Eliezer continued to earn his living as a water-carrier. One Friday he found a fish by the river and brought it home and as his wife was preparing the fish to be eaten on Shabbat, she found a precious stone in its stomach. She and her husband, knowing about a similar story which occurred centuries earlier with a Jew in France named Yitzhak, later to become the father of Rashi, they were upset that this could be a test from Heaven and decided not to change their live-style, to sell the stone (after consulting the local Rabbi in order to be sure that they are permitted according to Halakha to keep the stone) and to distribute the money for Tzedakah, thus remaining poor. Soon good news came - their older son, Rabbi Elimelech had married the daughter of a wealthy man, who was ready to support his Torah study and both Rabbi Elimelech and Rabbi Zusha were making great progress and had become scholars. Strange enough afterwards Reb Eliezer Lippa found another treasure by the river, but once again he and his wife decided to give the gold coins he found as a Tzedakah. Some time later a wealthy relative of Reb Eliezer died and Reb Eliezer and his wife inherited his estate thus becoming wealthy themselves. By this time their sons had become both prominent Tzaddikim and great scholars. Reb Eliezer Lippa and his wife lived many long and happy years continuing to support poor Jews and Torah scholars until the end of their days.

Various stories are being told about the long journeys of the two brothers Rabbi Zusha and Rabbi Elimelech. Rabbi Noach of Kobryn once heard that Chassidus managed to spread only in those areas through which they both traveled. "Where Rabbi Zusha and Rabbi Elimelech haven't been, there are no Chassidim."

A man once visited the holy Maggid of Mezeritch and said he had great difficulties applying the Talmudic saying that "A person is supposed to bless God for the bad just as he blesses Him for the good". The Maggid told him to find the Maggid's disciple Reb Zusha of Hanipoli and ask him. The man went and found Rabbi Zusha, who received him friendly and invited him to his home. When the guest came in, he saw how poor the family was, there was almost nothing to eat, they were beset with afflictions and illnesses. Nevertheless, Rabbi Zusha was always happy and cheerful. The guest was astonished at this picture. He said: "I went to the Holy Maggid to ask him how is it possible to bless God for the bad He send us the same way as we bless Him for the good, and The Maggid told me only you can help me in this matter." Rabbi Zusha said: "This is indeed a very interesting question. But why did our holy Rebbe send you to me? How would I know? He should have sent you to someone who has experienced suffering."

Rabbi Zusha once said: "I learned seven things from the thief: 1) What he does, he keeps to himself. 2) He is willing to take risks to attain his goal. 3) He does not distinguish between "major" and "minor" things, but takes equally exacting care of each and every detail. 4) He invests great effort in what he does. 5) He is swift. 6) He is always optimistic. 7) If at first he fails, he is back time and again for another try."

It is told that when Zusha was a young orphan, he used to study the Torah with Rashi's commentary, and when he came across a Rashi that he didn't understand, he used to cry a long time, until Rashi himself came to him and explained it to him.

Once Rabbi Zusha was in a class taught by the Maggid of Mezeritch. The Maggid began the class with a commonplace verse from the Torah: "And God spoke to Moses..." Just these few words were enough to excite and astonish Rabbi Zusha. He exclaimed "God spoke... GOD spoke... God SPOKE!" over and over until he had to be removed from the classroom due to the disruption he was causing.

When Rabbi Zusha was on his deathbed, his students found him in uncontrollable tears. They tried to comfort him by telling him that he was almost as wise as Moses and as kind as Abraham, so he was sure to be judged positively in Heaven. He replied, "When I pass from this world and appear before the Heavenly Tribunal, they won't ask me, 'Zusha, why weren't you as wise as Moses or as kind as Abraham,' rather, they will ask me, 'Zusha, why weren't you Zusha?' Why didn't I fulfill my potential, why didn't I follow the path that could have been mine."

== See also ==
- Anipoli (Hasidic dynasty)
