= Aharon of Karlin =

Aharon of Karlin may refer to:

- Aharon of Karlin (I) (1738–1771), founder of the Karlin-Stolin Hasidic dynasty
- Aharon of Karlin (II) (1802–1872), his grandson

== See also ==
- Karlin-Stolin (Hasidic dynasty)
