= Asher of Stolin (I) =

Hasidic rabbi (1759–1826)

Rabbi Asher Perlow of Stolin (I)

Personal life
- Born: 1759 Karlin, Pinsk, Vilna Governorate
- Died: 27 October 1826 (aged 66–67) Karlin, Pinsk, Vilna Governorate
- Spouse: Feiga
- Children: Aharon II, Pearl
- Parents: Aharon of Karlin (I) (father); Leah (mother)
- Dynasty: Karlin-Stolin

Religious life
- Religion: Judaism
- Denomination: Hasidic

Jewish leader
- Predecessor: Aharon I
- Successor: Aharon of Karlin (II)
- Dynasty: Karlin-Stolin

Rabbi Asher Perlow of Stolin (Hebrew: אשר פרלוב מסטולין; Yiddish: דער גרויסער רבי אשר, romanized: Der Groyser Rebbe Asher, lit. 'Rabbi Asher the Elder') (1759 – 27 October 1826) was the son of Rabbi Aharon the Great of Karlin and the third Admor of the Karlin dynasty, and the founder of its Stolin subdynasty.

== Biography ==
Perlow was born in 1759 to Rabbi Aharon of the Great of the Karlin dynasty and his wife Leah. His father, a disciple of the Maggid of Mezeritch, died when he was 12 years old, and was raised in his adolescence by his father's disciple, Rabbi Shlomo of Karlin. Following Shlomo's passing in 1792, most of his disciples turned to Perlow for guidance, serving in Karlin. Following a prohibition of Hasidim from growing payos in the locality, he moved his residence to Stolin.

In between the period of the head of Shlomo and Asher was leaders of the Karlin-Stolin movement, he traveled extensively with his friend, Rabbi Mordechai of Lechwitz, visiting people such as Rabbi Boruch of Medzhybizh, Rabbi Pinchas of Koritz, Avraham of Apta, and the Magid of Kuzhnitz, the latter of whom was a matchmaker for Perlow, matching him with a woman named Feiga (who was his 3rd wife).

In 1798, Perlow was imprisoned by the Russian government due to his dissidential speech, along with Rabbi Shneur Zalman of Liadi and Rabbi Mordechai of Lechwitz. He was released in Kislev of that year. He was banished and lived Koźnitz and Želechow before later returning to Stolin.

He encouraged his followers to immigrate to Eretz Yisrael, and worked to raise funds for the emigration. He worked on the contemporary movement of immigration with Abraham Kalisker, who himself had made Aliyah in the 1770s.

He stood out from other Hasidic rabbis due to his passionate prayers. He was used as a public messenger on behalf of the community. Rabbi David of Stepin testified that at the coming of the Messiah and the seven shepherds with him, they will honor Rabbi Asher of Stolin to pray before the ark. He led his congregation for 35 years until his death in Karlin on 26 Tishrei in the Gregorian year of 1826. His son, Rabbi Aharon II of Karlin succeeded him as the fourth Rebbe in the dynasty.

== Family ==
Perlow had no children from his first marriage. From his second marriage, he had a daughter named Pearl who married Rabbi Aharon Yaffe of Lechvitch, the son of Rabbi Mordechai of Liakhovichi. His third wife, Feiga, bore him his son Aharon II. Aharon bore a son, Rabbi Shlomo Chaim Perlow, who founded the Koidanov dynasty after studying under Asher.
