= Anipoli (Hasidic dynasty) =

Anipoli is a Hasidic dynasty founded by Rabbi Zusha of Hanipol (also known as Rebbe Zishe; died 1800). Its name derives from the Yiddish name of Hannopil, Ukraine.

== Lineage ==
The founder of the dynasty, Rabbi Meshulam Zusha of Hanipol or Meshulum Zusil of Anipoli, was an outstanding disciple of Maggid of Mezritch, who was a disciple of the Baal Shem Tov, the founder of Hasidism. He was also the brother of Rebbe Elimelech of Lizhensk.

- Rabbi Meshulam Zusha of Hanipol (1718–1800) — settled in Hanipol and Ḥasidim gathered around him; this circle grew after his brother Elimelech's death, when some of the Elimelech's Ḥasidim accepted Zusha as their rebbe.
  - Menahem Zvi Hirsh, his oldest son, succeeded him in Hanipol.
  - Israel Abraham (1772–1814), his youngest son, served as ḥasidic rabbi and admor in Chernyostrov. After Israel Abraham's death, his wife led the Ḥasidim for several years.

== See also ==
- History of the Jews in Poland
- History of the Jews in Galicia (Central Europe)
- History of the Jews in Ukraine
