= Maggid =

Traditional Jewish religious itinerant preacher

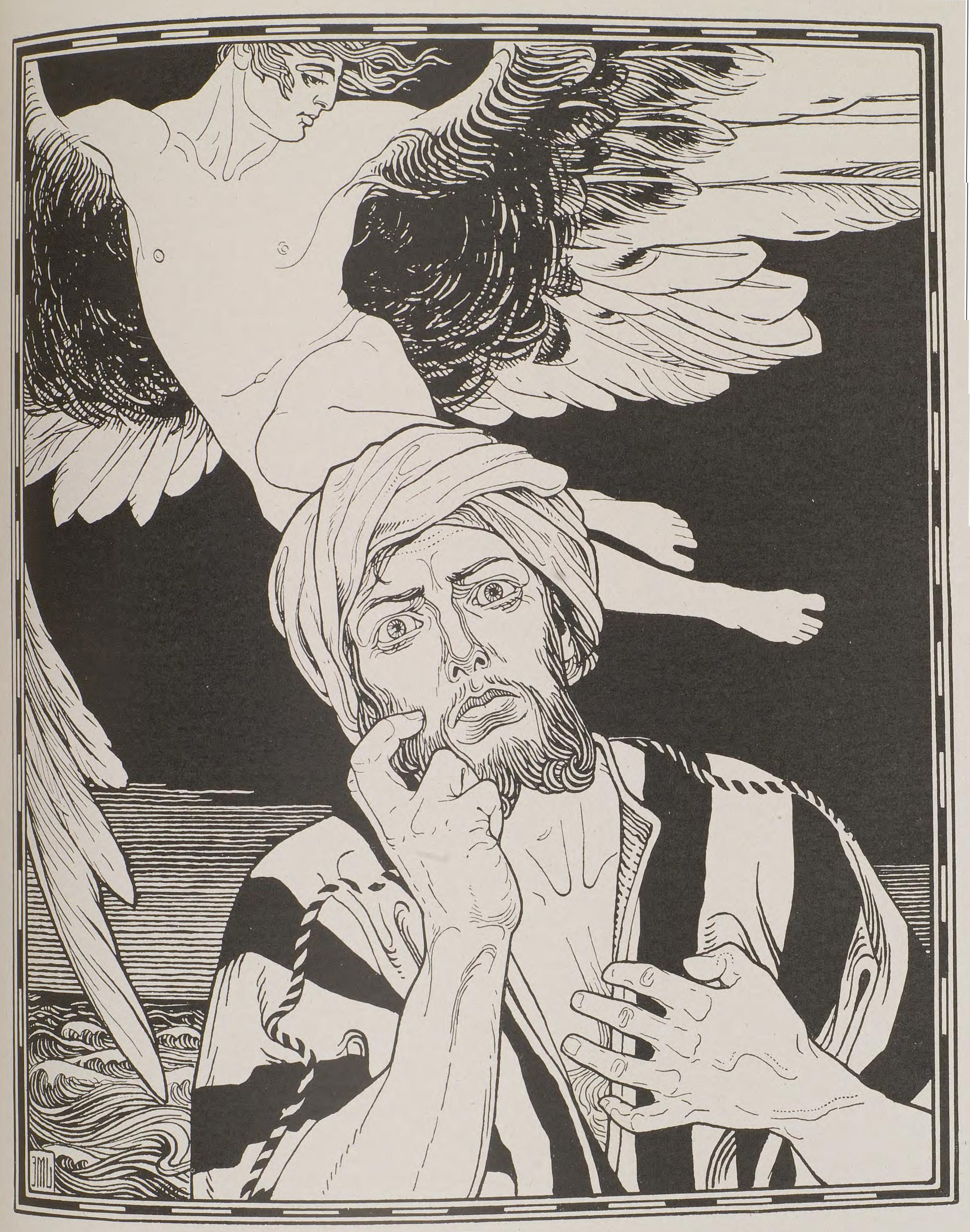
The prophet Daniel, with a maggid behind, from Die Bücher der Bibel, by Ephraim Moses Lilien. While the term maggid is frequently used to refer to an itinerant Jewish preacher, in Jewish esoteric traditions a maggid is an angelic teacher; a spirit guide.

A maggid (Hebrew: מַגִּיד), also spelled as magid, is a traditional Jewish religious itinerant preacher, skilled as a narrator of Torah and religious stories. A chaplain of the more scholarly sort is called a darshan (דרשן). The title of maggid mesharim ('a preacher of uprightness'; abbreviated מ״מ) probably dates from the sixteenth century.

There have long been two distinct classes of leaders in Israel—the scholar and rabbi, and the preacher or maggid. That the popular prophet was sometimes called "maggid" is maintained by those who translate מַגִּיד מִשְׁנֶה (maggid mishne) Zechariah 9:12, by "the maggid repeats" (Löwy, "Beqoret ha-Talmud," p. 50). Like the Greek sophists, the early maggidim based their preaching on questions addressed to them by the multitude. Thus the Pesiqta, the first collection of set speeches, usually begins with "yelammedenu rabbenu" ('let our master teach us'). An excellent example is the Passover Haggadah, which is introduced by four questions; the reciter of the answer is called the maggid. When there were no questions, the maggid chose a Biblical text, which was called the petichah (opening).

The term maggid comes from Jewish mysticism (see Magid) and originally referred to a celestial entity, most commonly an angel, who manifests itself as a voice delivering mystical secrets to a kabbalist, or sometimes speaking through the mouths of the chosen ones.

== Popularity of the Maggid ==
The greater popularity of the maggid as compared with the darshan is instanced from aggadic (homiletical or narrative material, as opposed to legal halachic material) stories in the Talmud (main text of Rabbinic Oral Torah discussion). The Talmud relates that the people left the lecture-room of R. Chiyya, the darshan, and flocked to hear R. Abbahu, the maggid. To appease the sensitive Chiyya, Abbahu modestly declared, "We are like two merchants, one selling diamonds and the other selling trinkets, which are more in demand" (Sotah 40a).Talmudic Sages like Rabbi Meir combined the functions of a darshan and a maggid (Sanhedrin 38b). When Rabbi Isaac Nappaha was requested by one in his audience to preach a popular haggadah, and by another a halakic discourse, he answered, "I am like the man who had two wives, one young and one old, and each wishing her husband to resemble her in appearance; the younger pulled out his gray hair while the older pulled out his black hair, with the result that he became entirely bald." R. Isaac thereupon delivered a lecture that embraced both halakah and aggadah (Bava Kamma 60b).

== In the Gaonic period and the Middle Ages ==
Levi ben Sisi, his son Joshua, and others were at the head of a regular school of rabbinical maggidim. R. Ze'era was opposed to their methods of twisting and distorting the Biblical verses to suit their momentary fancy. In Ze'era's estimation their works were of no more value than books on magic (Yer. Ma'as. iii. 9). In the Gaonic period and in the Middle Ages the principal of the yeshivah, or the rabbi, delivered a lecture before each festival, giving instructions in the laws governing the days of the festival. The maggid's function was to preach to the common people in the vernacular whenever occasion required, usually on Sabbath afternoon, basing his sermon on the sidra of the week. The wandering, or traveling, maggid then began to appear, and subsequently became a power in Jewry. His mission was to preach morality, to awaken the dormant spirit of Judaism, and to keep alive the Messianic hope in the hearts of the people. The maggidim's deliverances were generally lacking in literary merit, and were composed largely of current phrases, old quotations, and Biblical interpretations which were designed merely for temporary effect; therefore none of the sermons which were delivered by them have been preserved.

Maggidism reached a period of high literary activity in the 16th century. The expulsion of the Jews from Spain in 1492 revealed a master maggid in Isaac Abravanel. His homiletic commentary on the Bible became an inexhaustible source of suggestion for future maggidim. In his method of explaining every chapter, preceded by a number of questions, he followed the early maggidim and sophists. His long argumentations in an easy and fluent style were admirably suited to the purposes of a maggid. Moses Alshech, a maggidic scholar, was one of a community of great Jewish spiritual figures who shaped Jewish thought, in the 16th-century town of Safed in the Galilee. Others in his circle included the compiler of the Shulchan Aruch code, Yosef Karo, and the leading Kabbalists Moses Cordovero and Isaac Luria. In the mystical environment of this community, the Alshech preached every Sabbath before large audiences. Isaac Luria attended his expositions, which included Kabbalistic aspects. In his classic Biblical commentaries he followed closely the method of Abravanel. Alshech also became an authority for the maggidim, who quoted him frequently.

== Relation to Messianic fervour ==
The persecutions of the Jews brought forth a number of maggidim who endeavored to excite the Messianic hope as a balm to the troubled and oppressed Jewry. The new articulation and cosmic doctrines of redemption in Kabbalah, taught by Isaac Luria in the 16th century, inspired a new mystical awareness and focus on Messianism. Messianic messengers and potential candidates sought to advance the Messianic quest in Judaism. Asher Lemmlein preached in Germany and Austria, announcing the coming of the Messiah in 1502, and found credence everywhere. Solomon Molcho preached, without declaring the date of the advent, in both Italy and Turkey, and as a result was burned at the stake in Mantua in 1533. R. Höschel of Cracow (d. 1663) delighted in the elucidation of difficult passages in the midrash known as the "Midrash Peli'ah" ('wonderful, obscure midrash'). H. Ersohn's biography of Höschel, in his "Chanukkat ha-Torah" (Pietrkov, 1900), gives a collection of 227 "sayings" gathered from 227 books by various writers, mostly Höschel's pupils. These sayings became current among the maggidim, who repeated them on every occasion. Some maggidim copied his methods and even created a pseudo-Midrash Peli'ah for the purpose of explaining the original ingeniously in the manner initiated by R. Höschel. Behr Perlhefter is considered the first Maggid of the Sabbatian Abraham Rovigo in Modena. Perlhefter restored the Sabbatian theology after the death of the pseudo-Messiah, and advocate of mystical heresy, Sabbatai Zevi (1626-1676).

== Motivation and admonishment ==
Elijah ben Solomon Abraham ha-Kohen of Smyrna, in the beginning of the eighteenth century, published his "Shebet Moussar", which he divided into fifty-two chapters, one for each week. This book caused him to be known as the "Terror Maggid"; he preached moral and religious conduct as a safeguard against the terrible punishments of the day of judgment. Dante could not picture the horrors of hell and the punishments awaiting the wicked more minutely than did the author of the "Shebet' Musar". It established a new "fire and brimstone" school of maggidim. Musar ('admonishment') is a thread in traditional Jewish thought that seeks ethical inspiration, integrity or admonishment to motivate religious devotion. Classic texts of ethical guidance from the Middle Ages articulate spiritual and psychological levels to righteousness. The later 19th century Musar movement sought to incorporate spiritual introspection and self-analysis into the scholarly yeshiva curriculum. The Musar movement seeks to inspire spiritual advancement by discovering personal integrity and revealing the unworthiness of material temptations. Its spirituality does not always describe rewards and punishments, but admonishment can be a factor. It can draw ethical lessons from Jewish mysticism, but is often compared and contrasted with the mystical paths to inspiration of Kabbalistic dveikus (cleaving to God), and the popularisation of mystical fervour in Hasidism. Typically, Hasidism avoids rebuke of punishments, replacing it with shame and remorse from nullification of self-awareness, before the omnipresent Divine presence that awakens joy.

Judah Rosanes of Constantinople (d. 1727), in his "Parashat Derakim," combined the darshan with the maggid. He adopted a new method of harmonizing the acts of Biblical personages with the legal views of Talmudic scholars. For instance, Pharaoh, in refusing to release Israel from bondage, acted according to the contention of Abaye, while Moses insisted on Israel's release in accordance with the decision of Rabba. This farfetched pilpulism had many followers, some of whom asserted that Ahasuerus concurred in the decision of Maimonides, and that Vashti coincided with the opinion of RaBaD.

== The Dubner Maggid ==
Jacob Kranz of Dubno, the Dubner Maggid (d. 1804), author of "Ohel Ya'aqob", adopted the Midrash's method of explaining by parables and the incidents of daily life, such as the relations between the man of the city and the "yeshubnik" (village man), between the bride, the bridegroom, and the "mechuttanim" (contracting parents), and compared their relations to those between Israel and God. He drew also moral lessons from the "Arabian Nights" and from other secular stories in illustrating explanations of a midrash or a Biblical text. Moses Mendelssohn named Kranz the "Jewish Æsop".

His most famous parable is about how he finds appropriate parables: Walking in the woods a man sees many trees with targets drawn on them. Each target with an arrow in the center, and a little boy with a bow. The little boy acknowledges that he had shot all the arrows. When further questioned he answers: 'First I shoot the arrow, then I draw the target'.

Kranz's pupil Abraham Dov Bär Flahm edited and published the Dubner Maggid's writings, and a host of other maggidim adopted this method. In the same period there were Jacob Israel of Kremnitz, author of "Shebet' mi-Yisrael," a commentary on the Psalms (Zolkiev, 1772); Judah Löw Edel of Slonim, author of "Afiqe Yehudah," sermons (Lemberg, 1802); Chayyim Abraham Katz of Moghilef, author of "Milchama ve-Shalom" (Shklov, 1797); Ezekiel Feiwel of Deretschin, author of "Toledot Adam" (Dyhernfurth, 1809) and maggid in Wilna (Levinsohn, "Bet Yehudah," ii. 149).

In modern times, a descendant of the Dubner Maggid, Moshe Kranc wrote down several parables of his, along with modern interpretations, in a book about business and Jewish stories: "The Hasidic Masters' Guide to Management" (The Dubner Maggid was not Hasidic, but followed Lithuanian Jewish Orthodox spirituality. There are stories of his relationship with the Vilna Gaon).

== Philosophical Maggidim ==
The most celebrated maggid during the nineteenth century was Moses Isaac ben Noah Darshan, the "Kelmer Maggid" (b. 1828; d. 1900, in Lida). He was among the "terror" maggidim of the "Shebet' Musar" school and preached to crowded synagogues for over fifty years in almost every city of Russian Poland. Another prominent maggid was Chayyim Tzedeq, known as the "Rumsheshker" (Gersoni, "Sketches of Jewish Life and History," pp. 62–74, New York, 1873). The "philosophical" maggid is one who preached from Arama's "Aqedat" and Bachya's "Chobot ha-Lebabot" ('Duties of the heart'). Enoch Sundl Luria, the author of "Kenaf Renanim", on "Pirqe Shirah" (Krotoschin, 1842), was a noted philosophical maggid.

Meïr Leibush Malbim (d. 1880), in his voluminous commentaries on the Bible, followed to some extent Abravanel and Alshech, and his conclusions are pointed and logical. Malbim's commentaries are considered to offer the best material for the use of maggidim.

From the "terror", or "Musar", maggid developed the "penitential" maggid, who, especially during the month of Elul and the ten days of penitence between New-Year's Day and Yom Kippur, urged the wicked to repent of their sins and seek God's forgiveness. One of these "penitential" preachers was Jacob Joseph, chief rabbi of the Russian Jews in New York (d. 1902), formerly maggid of Wilna, and a student of the Musar movement. In the middle of his preaching he would pause to recite with the people the "Shema koleinu", and the "Ashamnu," raising the audience to a high pitch of religious emotion. The maggid usually ended his preaching with the words. "u-ba le-Tziyyon goel," etc. (a redeemer shall come to Zion speedily in our days; let us say "Amen"). Some of the wandering maggidim acted also as meshullachim (collectors of money for institutions). The yeshivot in Russia and the charitable institutions of Jerusalem, especially the Va'ad ha-Kelali, sent abroad meshullach-maggidim. The resident maggid who preached at different synagogues in one city was called the "Stadt Maggid", as in Wilna and other large cities in Russia. The modern, or "maskil", maggid was called "Volksredner" (people's orator), and closely followed the German "Prediger" in his method of preaching. Tzebi Hirsch Dainow (d. 1877) was the first of the modern type of maggid, which soon developed into that of the "national," or "Zionistic," maggid. Yehuda Zvi Yabzrov from White Russia, as well as Tzvi Hirsch Masliansky and Joseph Zeff, both of New York, were representatives of the latter class. See Homiletics.

See also Category:Maggidim

== Hasidic Maggidim ==
The founder of the Hasidic movement, Israel ben Eliezer, the Baal Shem Tov (Besht) (1698-1760), awakened a new stage and revival in Jewish mysticism. Hasidic philosophy internalised the abstract theological system of the earlier Kabbalah, by relating it to man's inner psychological awareness. This saw Divine omnipresence in everything, and brought this into personal dveikus (cleaving) through joyful fervour in daily life. This new teaching had popular appeal to the common folk, but also attracted great scholars who saw its deeper significances and philosophical depths. The Baal Shem Tov opposed the admonishing methods of the "musar" maggidim, which criticised and demoralised, as well as motivated, the community. His mysticism saw the inner holiness of each person. He would often illustrate to his disciples the preciousness in God's eyes of the simple sincerity of the unlearned Jewish folk. In the biographical hagiography of stories about the Baal Shem Tov, his encounters and "conversions" of admonishing preachers are recounted, as well as his encounters with the isolated, ascetic scholars, whose practices he also opposed.

His personal model of the Hasidic Master Rebbe was passed to the subsequent Hasidic Masters in the new Hasidic interpretation of the Tzaddik (saintly leader), who channels Divine blessing to the world. The microcosmic Messianic redemption offered by a Hasidic Rebbe, gave a new form of teacher and leader to the Jewish community, combining public mystic and redeemer, along with the traditional notions of darshan and maggid. Some Hasidic leaders are known with the name of "maggid", sometimes gained from before their adherence to Hasidism. The continual regard of this title to them, indicates a new interpretation of the traditional notion of a maggid, incorporated into the Hasidic role of Rebbe. The mystical revival of Hasidism elevated hagiographic storytelling about the Masters to a new degree in Judaism, reflecting the importance of the mystical adherence to a Tzaddik. The popular titles of each Master therefore reflect personal endearment and reverence.

Rabbi Dov Ber of Mezeritch (דוב בער ממזריטש) (1704/1710?-1772) is known as the Maggid (literally 'Sayer') of Mezritsh after being the Maggid of the town of Rovne. After initially being opposed to the Baal Shem Tov's new ideas, he became a disciple and member of the Baal Shem Tov's close inner circle. After the death of his Master, the disciples appointed Dov Ber to become his successor, leading the new Hasidic movement in the early years of its establishment. Rabbi Dov Ber, the Maggid of Mezeritch or "Great Maggid", is regarded as the first exponent of the philosophical system within the Baal Shem Tov's new teachings and doctrines, and one of its most important propagators. He became the architect of the new movement, devoting his attention to developing an academy of leading scholars and future leaders (the "Chevra Kaddisha"-Holy Society) to spread Hasidism across each of the regions of Western Europe after his death. His teachings appear in the volume Magid Devarav L'Yaakov. His inner circle of disciples included Rabbi Elimelech of Lizhensk, Rabbi Zusha of Anipoli, Rabbi Levi Yitzchok of Berditchev, Rabbi Aharon (HaGadol) of Karlin, Rabbi Menachem Mendel of Vitebsk, and Rabbi Shneur Zalman of Liadi.

== Notable Maggidim ==
- Glusker Maggid, see also Abba Glusk Leczeka, a poem by Adalbert von Chamisso
- Hillel Noah Maggid (Steinschneider), Lithuanian genealogist and historian, a descendant of the family of Saul Wahl
- Jacob ben Wolf Kranz of Dubno, der "Dubner Maggid" (1741-1804)
- Dov Ber of Mezeritch (about 1700–1772), the propagator of the early Hasidic movement
- Solomon ben Moses of Chelm, (also known as Shlomo of Chelm or Shlomo Chelma)
- Yechezkel Feivel (1755–1833), Maggid of Vilnius
- Zev Wolf of Zbarazh and Zloczow
- Sholom Schwadron (d. 1997), the "Maggid of Jerusalem"
- Zvi Hirsch Masliansky, American preacher
- The Kozhnitser (Kozienizer) Magid Yisroel Hopsztajn (c. 1733 - 1814), the "Maggid of Kozhnitz" and one of the three "patriarchs" of Polish Hasidism
- Shlomo Flam, the Lutzker Maggid
- Asher Zebi of Ostrowo

== See also ==
- Jewish commentaries on the Bible
- Benzion Yadler
