= Asher Zebi of Ostrowo =

19th-century rabbi

Asher Zebi ben David of Ostrowo was a 19th-century hasidic rabbi who served as Av Beit Din of Korets, Volhynia, and later as "maggid" (preacher) of Ostrowo, in the government of Lomza in Russian Poland. He was a pupil of Rabbi Dov Ber of Mezeritch.

== Ma'ayn haḤokmah ==
Asher is the author of "Ma'ayn haḤokmah" (Spring of Wisdom), Korets, 1817, containing kabbalistic homilies on the Torah and other books of the Hebrew Bible. Eliezer Zweifel in his work in defense of Hasidism ("Shalom al-Yisrael," pp. 81, 82) quotes aphorisms from this work; one of which shows Asher's contempt for those who study the laws of nature or secular science.
