= Hannopil, Khmelnytskyi Oblast =

Rural locality in Khmelnytskyi Oblast, Ukraine

Coordinates: 50°27′13″N 26°53′43″E

Hannopil Ганнопіль
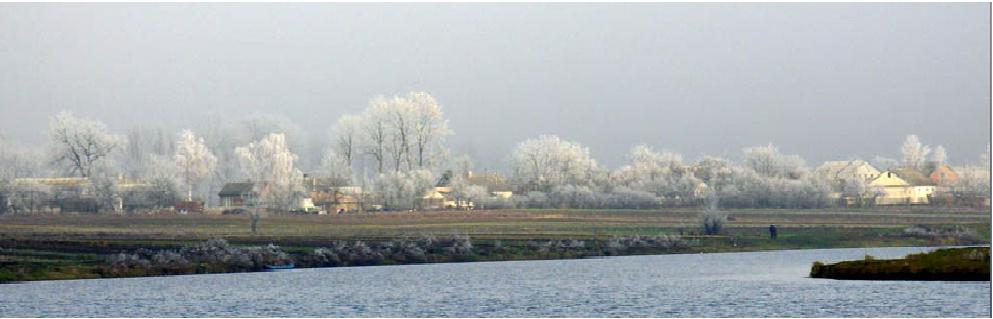
- Interactive map of Hannopil
- Country: Ukraine
- Oblast: Khmelnytskyi Oblast
- Raion: Shepetivka Raion

Population (2015)
  - Total: 804
- Postal code: 30030

Hannopil (Ukrainian: Ганнопіль) is a village located in Shepetivka Raion of Khmelnytskyi Oblast of Ukraine. It hosts the administration of Hannopil rural hromada, one of the hromadas of Ukraine. Landmarks include the graves of The Maggid of Mezrich and Reb Zusha of Annapoli. Hannopil (in Ukrainian: Ганнопіль) is a village located in the Slavuta Raion, in the Khmelnitsky Oblast in Ukraine. The number of inhabitants in the 2015 census was 804 people. The postal code is number 30030. The telephone code is number 3842. The population covers an area of 4.58 square kilometers.

== History ==
The village was known since 1602, with the name of Glinniki. In 1793, the village became part of the Volhynia Province of the Russian Empire. Between 1922 and 1991, the population was part of the Ukrainian Soviet Socialist Republic.

Until 18 July 2020, Hannopil belonged to Slavuta Raion. The raion was abolished in July 2020 as part of the administrative reform of Ukraine, which reduced the number of raions of Khmelnytskyi Oblast to three. The area of Slavuta Raion was merged into Khmelnytskyi Raion.

=== Judaism in Hannopil ===
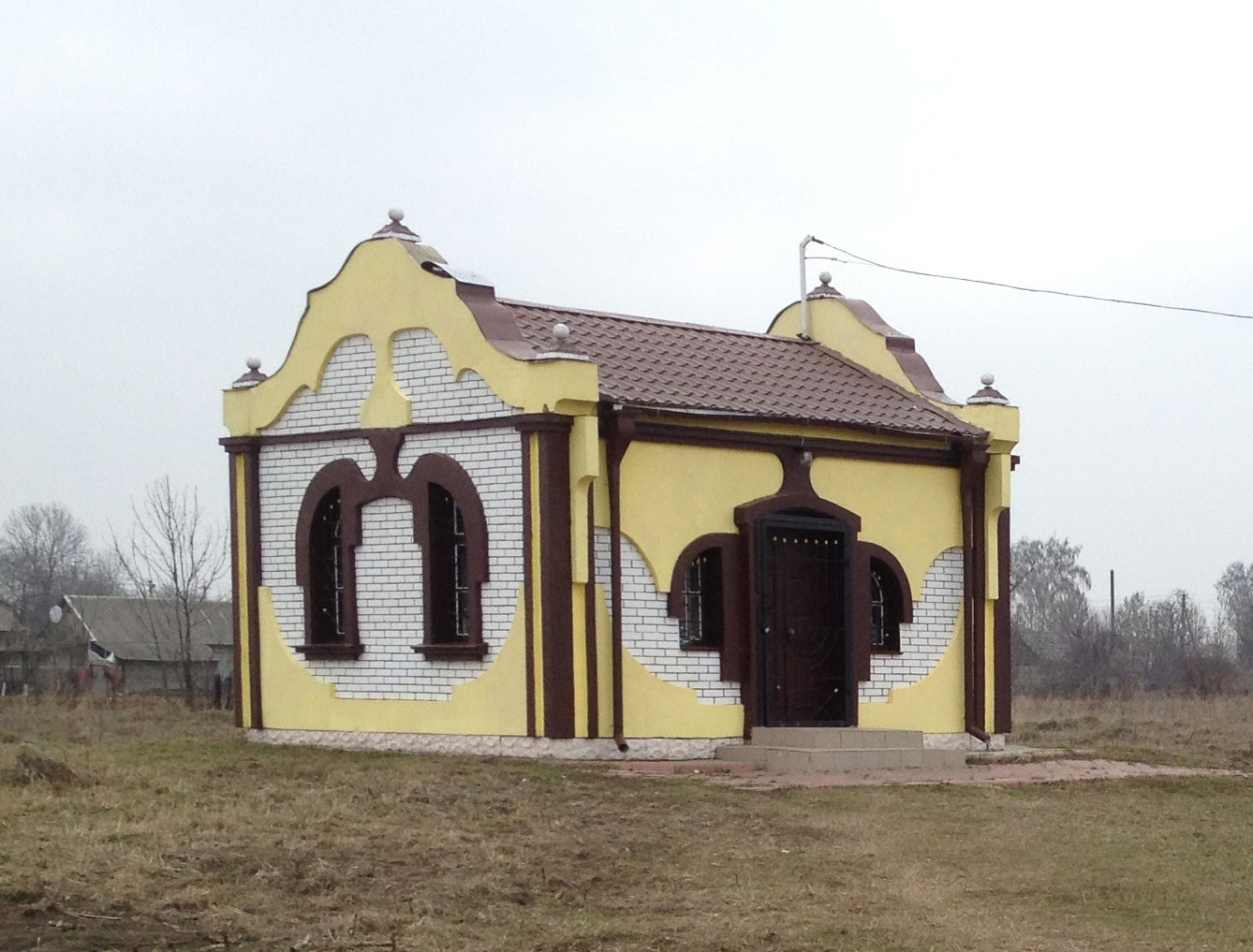
The Mausoleum of Dov Ber of Mezeritch and Zusha of Hanipol

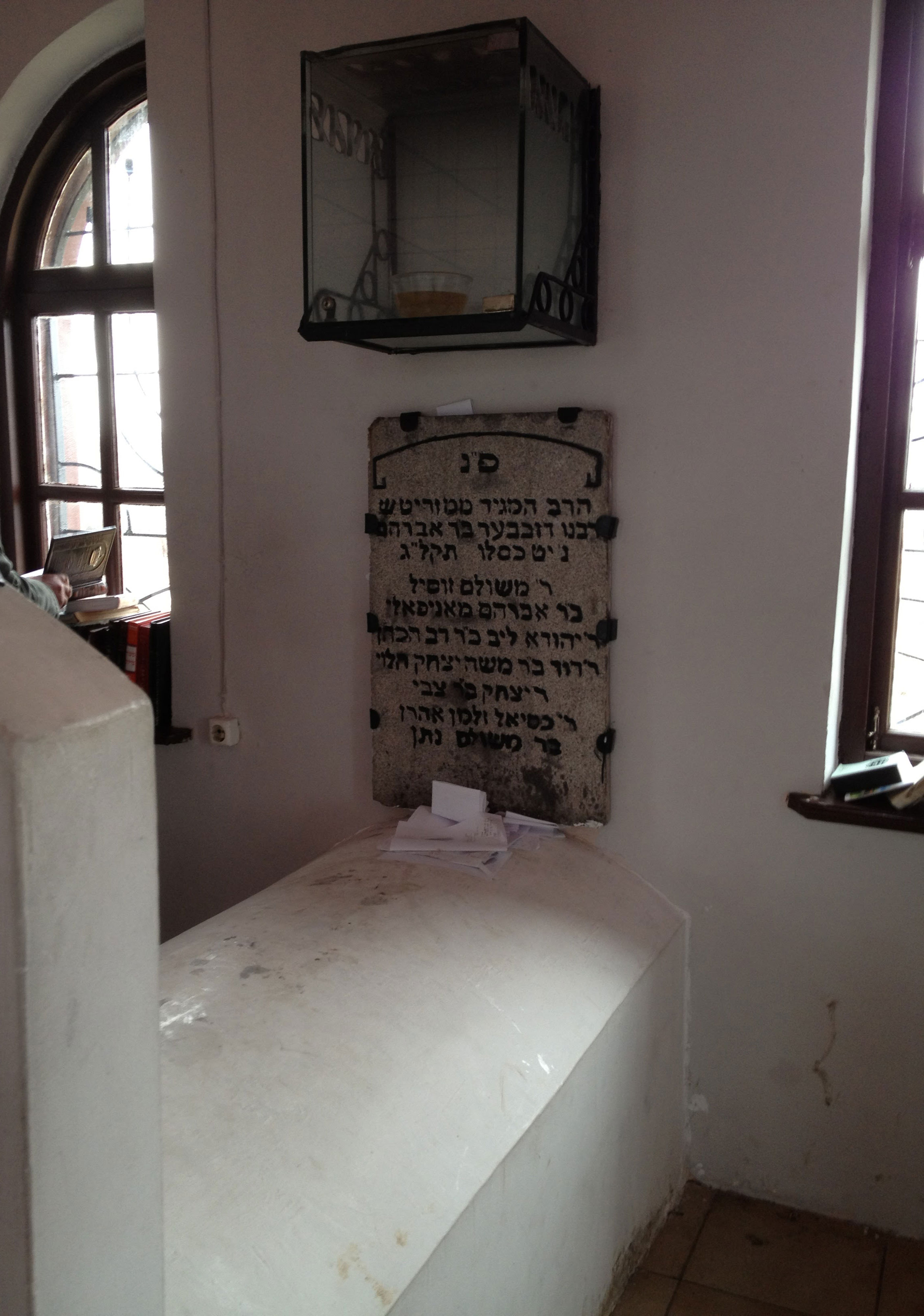
The grave of Dov Ber of Mezeritch

Jews settled in Hannopil, called Anipoli in Yiddish, in the 18th century. In 1784, about 215 Jews lived in Hannopil, in 1931 the Jewish population amounted to 1,280 inhabitants. Since the 1770s, Hannopil has played an important role in the movement of Hasidic Judaism.

Rabbi Dov Ber of Mezeritch and his son Avraham Ha-Malach (the Angel), lived in Hannopil. The angel later became a Tzadik in the town of Fastov. Rabbi Shneur Zalman of Liadi, was the first Rebbe and the founder of the Chabad-Lubavitch hasidic dynasty, Zalman studied next to the Maggid of Mezeritch. After the death of the Maggid of Mezeritch, his disciple and follower Meshulam Zusha settled in Hannopil.

=== Holocaust ===
During 1941 and 1942, the Jewish population of Hannopil was exterminated in the Holocaust. The tombs of Dov Ber and his faithful disciple Meshulam Zusha of Hanipol, located in the Jewish cemetery, were vandalized during the Second World War. Both tombs are a place of religious pilgrimage for Hasidic Jews.
