= Yechezkel Feivel =

19th century Lithuanian rabbi & author

Personal life
- Born: 1755 Polangen, Polish–Lithuanian Commonwealth
- Died: 1833 (aged 77–78) Vilna, Vilna Governorate, Russian Empire

Religious life
- Religion: Judaism

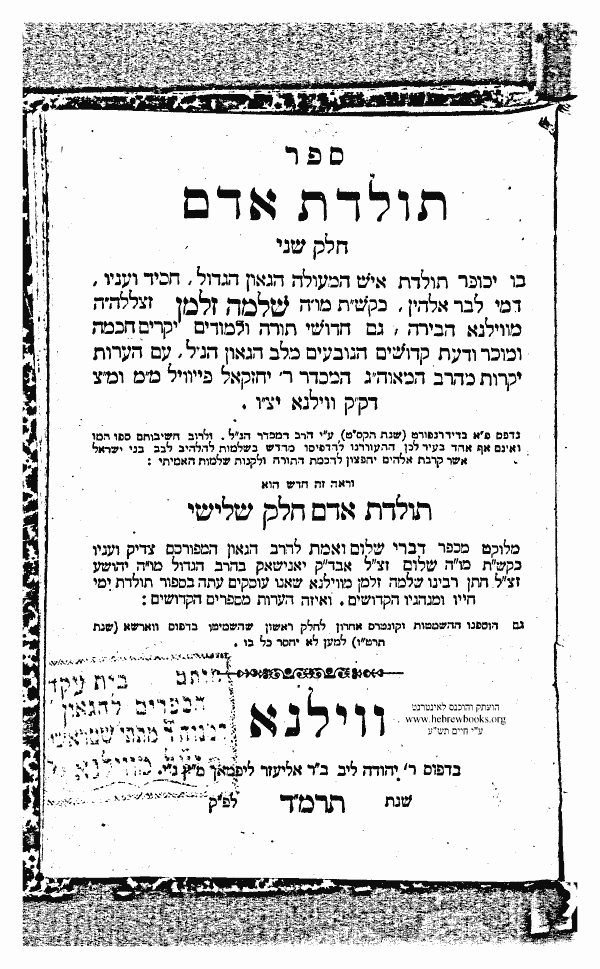
The title page of Toldos Adam, volume two

Yechezkel Feivel ben Ze'ev Wolf (Yiddish: יחזקאל פיוויל בן זאב וואלף, romanized: Yeḥezkel Feivel ben Ze'ev Volf; 1755–1833) was the Maggid in Vilnius in the early 19th century and the author of several books, including Toldos Adam, a hagiography of Rabbi Zalman of Vilna, the famed brother of Chaim of Volozhin and student of the Vilna Gaon.

== Biography ==
Ezekiel Feivel was born in Polangen in 1755. Early in life he filled the position of rabbi in his native town, and later at Deretschin. He then traveled as a maggid through Germany and Hungary, and, after residing for some time at Breslau, returned to Polangen and devoted himself to literary work. In 1811 he was appointed rabbi to the community of Vilna, which position he filled until his death.

== Reception and Analysis of Toldos Adam ==
Feivel's magnum opus, the biography Toldos Adam, achieved singular success in the rabbinic world. It is one of the few biographies which is cited in halachic works, including those of such leading scholars as Rabbi Akiva Eiger, Rabbi Ephraim Zalman Margolioth, and Rabbi Joseph Saul Nathansohn. However, Feivel was criticized by various rabbinic authorities, including Rabbi Zvi Hirsch Chajes and Rabbi Chaim Elazar Spira, for plagiarization and falsifying sources.

It has been demonstrated that large parts of Toldos Adam were lifted verbatim from the works of leading Maskilim such as Moses Mendelssohn and Naphtali Hirz Wessely, though not attributed to them.

== Works ==
- Musar haskel. Dyhernfurth: Yeḥiel Mikhel Maya. 1790.
- Toledot adam. Dyhernfurth: Yosef Maya. 1808.
- Bi'ure MaRIF, glosses on the Midrash Rabba.
