= Benzion Yadler =

Israeli rabbi

Benzion Yadler בן ציון ידלר
- Rabbi Benzion Yadler
- Title: Rabbi

Personal life
- Born: November 21, 1871 Jerusalem, Ottoman Empire
- Died: August 15, 1962 (aged 90) Jerusalem, Israel
- Buried: Har HaMenuchot, Jerusalem
- Occupation: Maggid

Religious life
- Religion: Judaism

Rabbi Benzion Yadler (Hebrew: בן ציון ידלר; 21 November 1871 – 15 August 1962) was a prominent Maggid in Jerusalem and the Moshavot of Israel.

== Biography ==
Ben Tzion Goldberg-Yadler was born in Jerusalem to Rabbi Yitzchok Zev Goldberg. Rabbi Yitzchok Zev was originally from the town of Myadzyel (called Myadl in Yiddish) in Belarus. He was called Yitzchok Zev Myadler, which people misinterpreted as meaning "mi-Yadler," denoting "from Yadler" in Hebrew. He authored the work Tiferet Zion, a commentary on Midrash Rabbah. Benzion's mother was Malka, the daughter of a rabbi from Grodno.

As a youngster, Benzion studied in Etz Chaim Yeshiva. After he married Henya, he began to study in the Pri Yitzchok Kollel. In 1894, he received rabbinic ordination from Rabbi Shmuel Salant and his rabbinical court.

While still young, Rabbi Yadler had physical difficulty with his eyes, so he accustomed himself to studying by heart. His genius in expounding Aggadah and Mussar was quickly recognized. Whenever his father would perform a siyum on completing a Talmudic tractate, young Benzion would deliver an aggadic lecture. This would occur at the Menachem Zion Beis Midrash, located at the courtyard of the Hurva synagogue. As his fame spread, Yadler began lecturing in other synagogues in Jerusalem and eventually in Jaffa and other settlements throughout Palestine. He also lived in Haifa for some time.

As of Shabbos Zachor 1902, Rabbi Shmuel Salant officially appointed Benzion Yadler as an official lecturer of sermons in Jerusalem. He also oversaw the Eruv of Jerusalem.

Yadler was very active in the overseeing observance of agricultural-related mitzvot. He would ride donkeys between the moshavot, from Metula in the north to Be'er Tuvia in the south, in order to instruct the farmers in these mitzvot. During the month of Elul and the Ten Days of Repentance, he would travel to Tel Aviv, Petah Tikva and Haifa to preach and awaken the community to repentance.

In the years 1912-1913, Rabbi Abraham Isaac Kook, then chief rabbi of Jaffa, sent Yadler to oversee terumot and maaserot in the moshavot in Samaria and the Galilee. In 1914, he participated in the rabbinical delegation that Rabbi Kook organized to visit the Jewish settlements in the northern part of the country.

Yadler wrote about the importance of Jewish education for girls, claiming that it was even more critical than Jewish education for boys. He was instrumental in establishing the first Haredi school for girls in Jerusalem.

In 1923, he was chosen to represent the Jerusalem community in the General Assembly of World Agudath Israel.

Rabbi Yadler passed away on the 15th of Av, 5722 (1962), while present at his granddaughter's wedding. He was buried on Har HaMenuchot in Jerusalem.

== Works ==
- Bituv Yerushalayim ("The Goodness of Jerusalem") (1967) - memories of Jerusalem and its great scholars in the last century.
