= David of Stepin =

Hasidic rabbi (died 1816)

Ha'Levi David Segal of Stepin
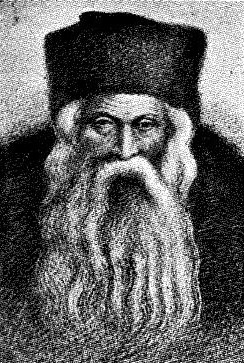

Personal life
- Died: 9 October 1810
- Children: Yisrael Dov Ber, Chaim Moshe, Miriam, Zipporah Zissel, Sheindel
- Parent: Yehuda Leib (father)

Religious life
- Religion: Judaism

Jewish leader
- Successor: Yisrael Dov Ber
- Synagogue: Synagogue of Stepin
- Yahrtzeit: 11 Tishrei

Rabbi David Segal Ha'Levi of Stepin (Hebrew: דוד מסטפין) (died 9 October 1810) was a disciple of the Baal Shem Tov and the Maggid of Mezeritch.

His father was Rabbi Yehuda Leib.

He was married twice.
