= Jacob ben Wolf Kranz =

Jacob ben Wolf Kranz of Dubno (Hebrew: יעקב קרנץ; 1741–1804), the Dubner Maggid (מגיד מדובנא), was a Lithuanian (Belarus)-born preacher (maggid). (Alternative spelling of family name: Kranc.)

== Famous fables and stories ==
The Dubner Maggid is famous for his fables or parables designed to teach or illustrate an instructive lessons based on Jewish tradition. The most famous fable of the Dubner Maggid is about the way in which he was able to find such fitting fables. When asked about this the Maggid replied: Once I was walking in the forest, and saw tree after tree with a target drawn on it, and at the center of each target an arrow. I then came upon a little boy with a bow in his hand. "Are you the one who shot all these arrows?", I asked. "Yes!" he replied. "Then how did you always hit the center of the target?" I asked. "Simple," said the boy: "First I shoot the arrow, then I draw the target."

== History ==
Kranz was born at Zietil (Yiddish זשעטל Zhetl)(now Dzyatlava), (then Lithuania now Belarus) in about 1740 and died at Zamość on 18 December 1804. At the age of eighteen he went to Międzyrzec Podlaski (Meseritz), where he served as a preacher. He stayed there for two years, and then became preacher successively at Zolkiev, Dubno, Włodawa (Lublin region), Kalisch, and Zamość. He remained at Dubno eighteen years and is best known for being the Rabbi here. He left Dubno for Vilnius at the request of the famous Vilna Gaon, who, having recently recovered from a sickness and being unable to study, sought diversion in his conversation.

Kranz was considered to be unrivaled preacher. Possessed of great eloquence, he illustrated both his sermons and his homiletic commentaries with parables taken from human life. By such parables he explained the most difficult passages of the Tanakh, and cleared up many perplexing questions in Halakha. He was also an eminent rabbinical scholar, and on many occasions was consulted as an authority.

Confronted with imposters there were several tests that Kranz would go through to prove he was the true Maggid, opening the Tanakh at random, and inventing parables on the spot.

== Books ==
All of Kranz's works were published after his death by Abraham Bär Flahm with the permission of Kranz's son Yitzhak Kranz who found notes left over by the Maggid in Mezritch where he had preached, and was able to piece together parts of some other books.

- "Ohel Ya'akov", a homiletic commentary on the Pentateuch abounding with graphic parables (i., Józefów, 1830; ii., Zolkiev, 1837; iii., Vienna, 1863; iv., 1861; v., Vienna, 1859);
- "Kol Ya'akov" (Warsaw, 1819), a similar commentary on the Five Scrolls;
- "Kochav mi-Ya'akov", a commentary on the "haftarot";
- "Emes le-Ya'akov" (Zolkiev, 1836), a commentary on the Passover Haggadah;
- "Sefer ha-Middos" (n.p., 1862), ethics arranged in eight "gates" or sections, each section being divided into several chapters. This work resembles very much the "Hobot ha-Levavot" of Bachya.

As the author himself had given no name to it, Abraham Bär Flahm, its editor, at first intended to call it "Chovos ha-Levavos he-Chadash" (The New Duties of the Heart, a reference to an 11th Century famous book); but out of respect for the author, Bachya, he changed his mind. The editor also revised the work, and added to it a preface containing a sketch of Kranz's life, and glosses of his own under the title "Shiyurei ha-Middos". Moses Nissenboim of Przemyśl extracted from the author's "Ohel Ya'akov" some of the parables, added some of funny stories in the Maggid's name and published them in one book entitled "Mishlei Ya'akov" ("The Parables of Jacob" Kraków, 1886). Following an open letter by Abraham Flahm printed in the popular Hagaddah that year claiming plagiarism and forgery, Nissenboim agreed to print Flahm's preface in the succeeding reprints. The agreement is kept to this day. Several parables never published till modern times, but passed on orally in the family, have been written down by Moshe Kranc, a descendant of the Dubner Maggid, in a book about business and Jewish tales: "The Hasidic Masters' Guide to Management".

== Sources ==
- Bibliography: Sefer ha-Middos, Preface;
- Fuenn, Keneset Yisrael, p. 543;
- H. Margaliot, in Ha-Tzefirah, 1902, No. 8.
