= Yehuda Zvi Yabzrov =

Russian rabbi, lecturer, and Zionist (1854–1935)

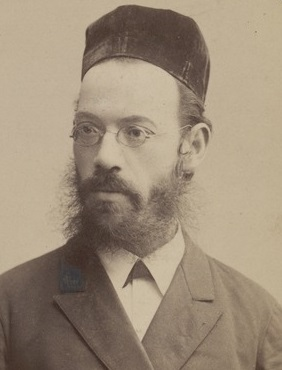
- Occupation: Rabbi, Maggid, lecturer

Yehuda Zvi Yabzrov (alternate spelling Yehuda Lieb Tzvi Yevzerov, Hebrew: יהודה ליב צבי יֶבזֶרוֹב, Russian: Лейб Евзеров; 1854 – April 16, 1935), also known as Yehuda Zvi Bar Moshe, was a Russian rabbi, lecturer, and Zionist.

A nationalist propagandist as well as traditional Jewish preacher (a "Maggid"), he was well known in Russia. He was one of the first and foremost members of Hovevei Zion, a Khislavichi native, and has been recognized as one of the foremost Zionist preachers – on par with Rabbi Bezalel Tsadikov (the Tsodikov Maggid), Rabbi Hyam (Chaim Zundel) Maccobi of Maccabi (the Maggid of Kaminitz or Kamenitzer Maggid), Rabbi Zvi Hirsch Masliansky and Rabbi Yitshak Nisenboim.

== Biography ==
Died in Tel Aviv in the spring of 1935. Buried in Trumpeldor Cemetery , a site maintained by the Hevra Kadisha of Tel Aviv-Yafo. In the epitaph on his tombstone is written: "One of the first preachers to Habat Zion" ("מהמטיפים הראשונים לחבת ציון").
