= Aharon of Karlin (I) =

Hasidic rebbe and rabbi (1736–1772)

Rabbi Aharon ben Jacob Perlov
- Title: Rebbe of Karlin

Personal life
- Born: Aharon ben Jacob Perlov; 1736 Janova, Polish–Lithuanian Commonwealth
- Died: 1772 (aged 35–36) Karlin, Polish–Lithuanian Commonwealth
- Buried: Karlin Cemetery
- Spouse: Leah
- Children: Rabbi Asher of Stolin, Rabbi Yaakov, Chaya Sarah, Rivka
- Parent(s): Yaakov of Kobrin and Perl
- Dynasty: Karlin-Stolin
- Occupation: Rabbi, Rebbe, Teacher

Religious life
- Religion: Judaism
- Denomination: Hasidic Judaism
- Profession: Religious Leader

Jewish leader
- Successor: Rabbi Shlomo of Karlin
- Position: Rebbe
- Synagogue: Karlin-Stolin Synagogue
- Ended: 1772
- Other: Founder of Hasidic center in Karlin
- Residence: Karlin
- Dynasty: Karlin-Stolin

Aharon ben Jacob Perlov of Karlin (Hebrew: רבי אהרן הגדול בן יעקב פרלוב מקרלין), (1736-1772), known among the Ḥasidim as Rabbi Aharon the Great, was one of the early rabbis of the Hasidic movement who significantly contributed to its rapid spread in Eastern Europe. He is recognized as the founder of the Hasidic center in Karlin, a suburb of Pinsk in the Polish–Lithuanian Commonwealth. He was distinguished for the fiery eloquence of his exhortations (sermons) and is known simply as the "Preacher" or "Censor".

Aharon of Karlin was a prominent disciple of Rabbi Dov Ber of Mezeritch, the successor to the Baal Shem Tov. His mode of Divine service, characterized by ecstatic fervor and passionate prayer, continues to influence Hasidic groups such as Karlin (Stolin) and Slonim today.

Perlov composed and wrote the famous Sabbath hymn Yah Ekhsof (יה_אכסוף) which is still a widely sung part of the liturgy of the Ḥasidim and has recently become popular among non-Hasidim as well. His ethical will and some collectables are printed in the work of his grandson, Aharon ben Asher of Karlin.

== Biography ==
Aharon ben Jacob Perlov was born in the year 5496 (1736) in Janova, Polish–Lithuanian Commonwealth. His father was the Rav and hidden tzaddik, R. Yaakov of Pinsk (or Kobrin), brother of Rabbi Nachman of Kosov. His mother was Perl bat Feivush, the sister of R. Manlee of Karlin, a recognized Hasid of the Maggid of Mezeritch. The family name "Perlov" was derived from his mother's name, Perl. Aharon traced his lineage back to King David.

He was a preacher (Magid) in Lithuania. Aharon was a prominent student of Rabbi Dov Ber of Mezeritch. The Karlin-Stolin dynasty, which he founded, is one of the oldest Hasidic movements, tracing its origins to the 18th century in what is now Belarus.

He died at the age of 36, one year before his master, Rabbi Dov Ber of Mezeritch. His gravestone in the Karlin cemetery reads:

He merited and brought merit to many, many times, and devoted his life with mesirut nefesh for this, as his purpose was to bring merit to the many, and he rebuked the masses with open rebuke and hidden love to bring Israel closer to their Father in Heaven and unite them with true unity.

== Role in the Hasidic Movement ==
In his youth, he studied Talmud and halachic texts. Under the influence of his maternal uncle, Rabbi Manly of Karlin, he became close to Rabbi Dov Ber, the "Maggid of Mezeritch," who was the successor of the Baal Shem Tov, and became one of his prominent disciples. He played a crucial part in the dissemination of Hasidism in Eastern Europe. He was a charismatic figure who brought the new teachings of Hasidism to Pinsk, an area known as a stronghold of opposition to Hasidism. The Hasidic center he established in Karlin (a suburb of Pinsk) acted in parallel to the center in Mezritsch. Together with Rabbi Menahem Mendel of Vitebsk, he spread the teachings of Hasidism throughout Lithuania.

The center in Karlin was so influential that its name became a general designation for the movement; by the last quarter of the 18th century, "Karliner" was a common name for all Hasidim among both European Jews and Russian authorities. Solomon Maimon, in his Lebensgeschichte published around 1792–1793, referred to Mezeritch and Karlin as the central locations of the new movement, noting that pilgrims traveled to Karlin and other holy places to hear the new doctrine.

Aharon's authority in the community derived in part from his status as a disciple of the Maggid. He was involved in communal affairs, using his credentials as a disciple of the Admor (the Maggid) to reinforce the validity of new regulations, such as the kropki tax legislation of 1769 in Nieswiez, Lithuania, which aimed to protect the rights of the weaker members of the community. Some scholars attribute the emphasis on the social improvement of the lower classes, marking a social turn in Hasidism, partly to his activity in this regard.

== Teachings and Ethos ==
Aharon of Karlin’s strong spiritual personality and teachings centered on achieving a state of fervent and ecstatic devotion to the Creator. Aharon was known for encouraging others to pray with great fervor, even to the point of shouting aloud. This practice continues to this day in the Karlin Hasidic court.

Rabbi Aharon focused his aspirations specifically on the love of the Creator—which he described in his will as 'bringing Israel closer to their heavenly Father'. Hasidic tradition recounts that Rabbi Shneur-Zalman of Ladi described Aharon’s fear of God as intense as that of a condemned man watching an arrow aimed at him leave the bow.

Rabbi Aharon, who had a musical talent, is the author of the well-known piyyut Yah Echsof. This piyyut is one of the few canonical Hasidic compositions that has been included in the Shabbat zemirot and is still sung today in many Hasidic courts in various melodies. According to Hasidic tradition, he composed the piyyut at the instruction of his teacher, the Maggid of Mezeritch.

Despite his extensive influence, few of Aharon’s direct teachings or writings have been preserved, apart from some sayings, his ethical will, and a Shabbat song. His teachings were recorded by his disciples and primarily in the writings of his grandson, Rabbi Aharon of Karlin (the second), author of the book Beit Aharon.

== Family ==
Rabbi Aharon and his wife Leah had four children:

- Their eldest son, Rabbi Yaakov, was the son-in-law of Rabbi Avraham of Karlin, and he emigrated with him to the Land of Israel, where he lived in Safed and Tiberias. His son-in-law was Shmuel Eliezer Rokach, son of Rabbi Meir of Lublin, who was the son-in-law of Rabbi David Lykes of Bar.
- Rabbi Asher – later the Rebbe of Stolin.
- Chaya Sarah, the wife of Rabbi Mordechai of Chernobyl. She had four children with him: 1. Rabbi Aharon Twersky of Chernobyl (in his first marriage, he was the son-in-law of Rabbi Gedaliah of Linits. In his second marriage, he married Hannah Malka, daughter of Rabbi Zvi of Kroshchov). 2. Moshe Twersky of Koristchov (his first wife was Esther. In his second marriage, he was the son-in-law of Zvi Aryeh Landa of Lik. In his third marriage, his wife was Hannah, daughter of Yaakov Yosef of Ostroh). 3. Yaakov Yisrael of Charkas (his wife was Devorah Leah, daughter of the Rebbe Rabbi Dov Ber of Lubavitch). 4. Malka (wife of Yechiel Michl of Drohobych).
- Rivka, the second wife of Shalom Shekena Altschuler. She had two daughters with him: 1. Devorah (wife of Rabbi Chaim Heikel, Av Beit Din of Hardonoy, son of Miriam and Moshe Ber of Stolin, son-in-law of the Rebbe Rabbi Shlomo of Karlin). 2. Esther Hadas (wife of Yehoshua Palik).

== Succession and Dynasty ==
Upon his death in 1772, Rabbi Aharon the Great was succeeded by his disciple, Rabbi Shlomo of Karlin. Rabbi Shlomo (1738–1792) was a disciple of both Aharon and the Maggid of Mezritch. Although Shlomo left no written works, stories and sayings about him were recorded. He gained fame as a miracle worker and viewed the tzaddik's role as including responsibility for the material welfare of his Hasidim. Shlomo’s ecstatic prayer, characterized by loud cries, became a defining practice of the Karlin Hasidim for generations.

Rabbi Shlomo was succeeded by Aharon the Great's son, Rabbi Asher of Stolin (Asher Perlov, 1765–1826). Asher settled in Zelekhev in Central Poland. From Karlin Hasidism branched out the Hasidic dynasties of Ludmir, Lochowitz, Kobrin, Slonim, and Koidanov.

The Karlin-Stolin Hasidic Dynasty continues to flourish today under the current Stoliner Rebbe, maintaining vibrant communities worldwide. The current Rebbe is noted for his focus on fostering a connection to tradition, education, and kindness (chesed).
