= Aharon of Karlin (II) =

Russian Hasidic rabbi (1802–1872)

Aaron Ben Asher of Karlin

Personal life
- Born: June 6, 1802
- Died: June 23, 1872 (aged 70) Malinov (Mlinov, Mlynov), Volhynia
- Children: Asher of Stolin (II)
- Parent: Asher of Stolin (father)
- Occupation: Rabbi

Religious life
- Religion: Judaism

Jewish leader
- Predecessor: Asher of Stolin
- Successor: Asher of Stolin
- Position: Leader of the Karlin Hasidic dynasty
- Main work: Bet Aharon

Aaron Ben Asher of Karlin (June 6, 1802 – June 23, 1872), known as Rabbi Aaron II of Karlin, was a famous rabbi of the Ḥasidim in northwestern Russia.

The son of Rabbi Asher of Stolin, thousands of followers used to visit him annually, about the time of the Jewish New Year. It was the custom among that sect, and he was highly esteemed by his adherents. He "reigned" in Karlin, near Pinsk, in the government of Minsk (currently in Belarus), in succession to his father and his grandfather, Aaron ben Jacob.

A few years before his death, he quarreled with a family of Karlin and moved from there to Stolin, a town several miles away. Considering the amount of business that the yearly influx of strangers brought to the city where he resided, his removal was regarded as a misfortune for Karlin. He died, aged seventy years and seventeen days, in Malinov (also spelled Mlinov and Mlynov), near Dubno, in Volhynia, while on a journey to the wedding of his granddaughter. He was succeeded by his son, Asher of Stolin. Myths developed in Mlynov about his death and about a tree that grew into the shape of a menorah on the spot where he died. A memorial, referred to as a "tent" (ohel) was established in Mlynov where the local Jewish community kept an eternal light burning and which became a pilgrimage site for Karliners. Jewish children in Mlynov recall the large pilgrimages to the shtetl on the yarhzeit of his death during which the miracles and wonders were recounted.

His son, Asher, died in Drohobycz about one year after the death of his father and was succeeded by his five-year-old son, the so-called Yenuḳa (Baby) of Stolin, against whose rabbinate (in the Ḥasidic sense) Schatzkes — or, according to others, Judah Lob Levin (called Yehallel of Kiev) — under the pseudonym "Ḥad min Ḥabraya" (One of the students), wrote a satire in "Ḥa-Shaḥar" (vi. 25-44).

Aaron is the author of Bet Aharon (Aaron's House; Brody, 1875), which is an important hassidic work, and especially for Karliner hassidim. The work includes thoughts on the weekly Torah readings and letters to his hassidic followers. It also contains the writings of his grandfather, of his father, and of his son.

Aaron's daughter, Miriam, married Rabbi Avrohom Yaakov Friedman (1820–1883), the first Rebbe of the Sadigura Hasidic dynasty.

== Jewish Encyclopedia bibliography ==
- Walden, Shem ha-Gedolim he-Ḥadash, p. 18;
- Ḳinat Soferim, note 1294, Lemberg, 1892.

== See also ==
- Karlin-Stolin (Hasidic dynasty)
