= Karlin (Pinsk) =

Coordinates: 52°14′14.7″N 25°50′33.8″E

Karlin Каралін
- 19th-century view of the destroyed castle; sketch by Napoleon Orda
- Interactive map of Karlin
- Country: Belarus
- Region: Brest
- District: Pinsk

Karlin or Karalin (Belarusian: Каралін; Russian: Карлин; Yiddish: קארלין) was a town just outside Pinsk, Belarus. It was founded as an independent town in 1690 and was named after the founder, Jan Karol Dolski. By 1695, Dolski had built a church (now a concert hall) and a fortified manor on the spot. He also allowed Jews to settle in the area, where it became the seat of a Hasidic dynasty.

Now Karlin is a district of Pinsk.

== Overview ==
The Wiśniowiecki family took control of the town and extended the castle. In 1706, however, the town was captured by the Swedish forces and the castle was destroyed. In the second partition of Poland in 1793, Karlin was part of the region ceded to the Russian empire. In 1799, the Russian authorities incorporated Karlin into Pinsk. In 1832, a new church of the Bernardines was built there (currently an Orthodox church devoted to St. Barbara)..

== Notable people from Karlin ==
- Aaron ben Jacob of Karlin
- Aaron ben Asher of Karlin

== See also ==
- Karlin-Stolin (Hasidic dynasty)
