= Shlomo Flam =

Volhynian Rabbi (died 1813)

Rabbi Shlomo Flam
- Title: Lutzker Maggid

Personal life
- Died: January 1813

Religious life
- Religion: Judaism

Jewish leader
- Yahrtzeit: 10 Shevat, 5573

Shlomo Flam (died January 1813), known as the Lutzker Maggid, was a Volhynian Hasidic rabbi and maggid in Lutsk and in Sokal.

He was a disciple of Rabbi Dov Ber of Mezeritch and the teacher of several prominent rabbis including Rabbi Sholom Rokeach.

Rabbi Flam's son was the rabbi of Olesko.
