= Eliezer Zweifel =

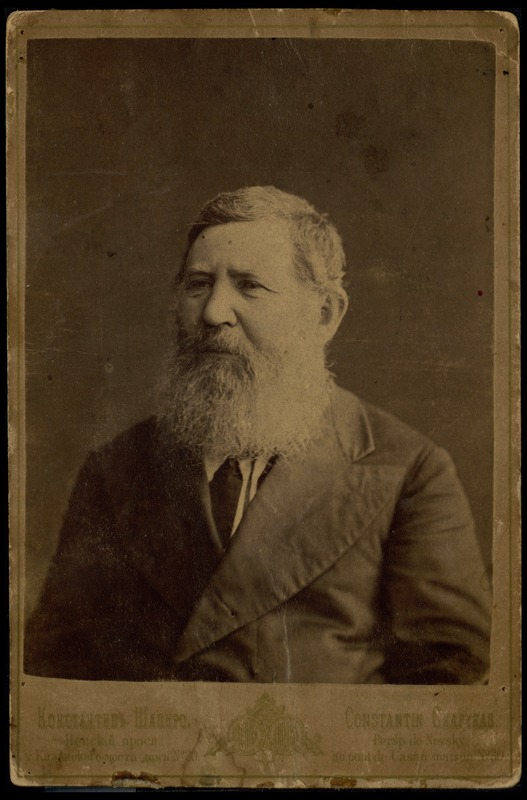
- Eliezer Zvi Zweifel in 1876
- Born: April 15, 1815
- Died: February 21, 1888 (aged 72)

Eliezer Zweifel (1815–1888) (Hebrew: אליעזר צבי צְוַויפֶל) was a Russian-Jewish writer who was associated with the Jewish Enlightenment movement (haskalah). Zweifel's writings on Hasidic Judaism were favourable to the movement. His book Shalom al Yisrael is believed to be one the earliest academic works on the Hasidic movement.

== Biography ==
Eliezer Zweifel was raised in the Mogilev region of White Russia. While in his twenties, Zweifel moved to Odessa, where he worked as a religious preacher and tutor for sixteen years. From 1853 to 1873, Zweifel was appointed as a Talmud teacher at Beth Midrash L'Rabbanim in Zhytomyr, an institution associated with the Jewish Enlightenment movement (haskalah). Zweifel's writings often contained anti-Haskalah statements and drew criticism from other Haskalah authors including Mendele Mokher Sefarim. Zweifel authored a number of books and contributed dozens of essays to the Jewish periodicals of his time.

== Books ==
- Minnim V"ugav [Psaltery and Harp]. Vilna. 1853.
- Tushiya. Zhitomir. 1867.
- Shalom 'Al Yisrael [Peace upon Israel]. Zhytomyr. 1868. – his magnum opus
- Heshbono Shel 'Olam [An Accounting of the World]. Warsaw. 1878.
- Sanegor [Defender]. Warsaw. 1885. – a defense of the Talmud
