= Abba Glusk Leczeka =

Abba Glusk Leczeka is a poem by Adalbert von Chamisso, published in 1832. It relates the story of one Abba, who, at the age of sixty, attracted by the fame of Moses Mendelssohn, went to Berlin to acquire secular knowledge. In his native town, Glusk, Abba was persecuted by the fanatical representatives of the orthodox Jewish community for his liberal views. He had to leave the town, and traveled from place to place as a wandering preacher (maggid). When he came to Wilna, he had thirteen works ready for publication, but on account of their radical tendencies they were burned in the courtyard of the synagogue. Probably he himself would have fared badly had not a rabbi come to his assistance. In an article published in "Ha-Karmel," 1872, No. 5, where a Hebrew translation of Chamisso's poem is given, it is stated that Joshua Selig Salkind in his childhood witnessed the burning of the "Glusker maggid's" books, and that Elijah, the gaon of Wilna, saved him from the mob. Kayserling thinks that Abba Glusk Leczeka is a poetical presentation of Solomon Maimon's real adventures, but S. Stanislavski (in "Voskhod," 1887, No. 12) contends that he is the Glusker Maggid.
