= Levi Yitzchok of Berditchev =

Ukrainian rabbi and Jewish leader

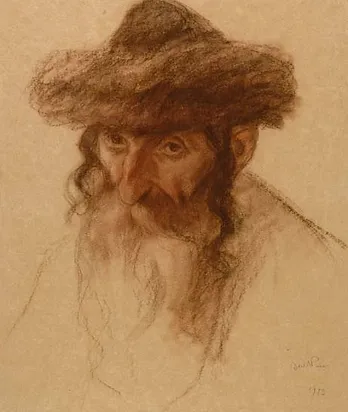

Personal life
- Born: 29 of Iyar, 25 or 26 of May, 1740 Husakiv
- Died: 5 October (25 of Tishrei), 1809 Berdychiv
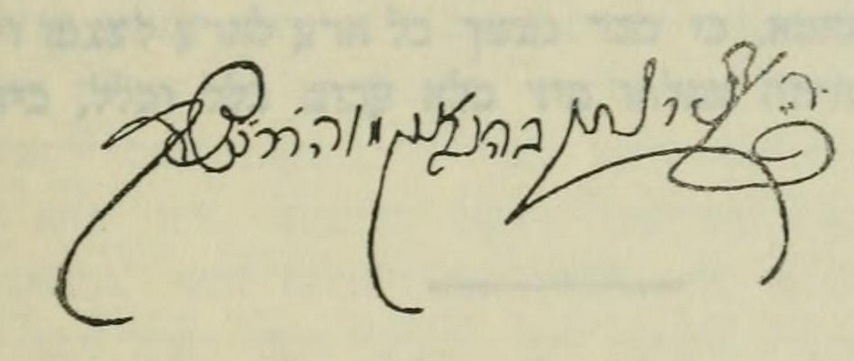
- Signature

Religious life
- Religion: Judaism
- Denomination: Hasidic

Jewish leader
- Predecessor: Shmelke of Nikolsburg
- Position: rabbi of Ryczywół

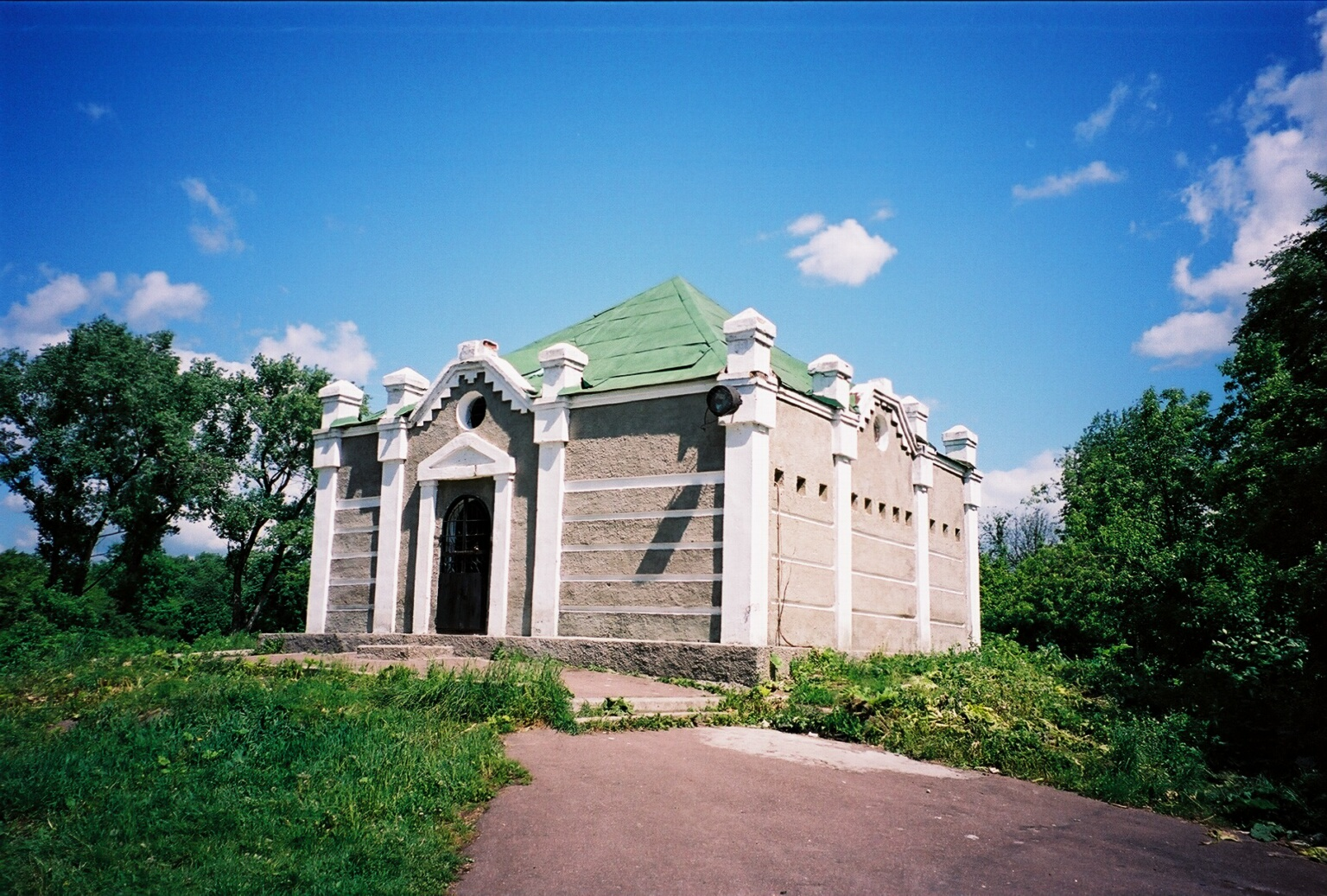
Mausoleum of Rabbi Levi Yitzchak in the old cemetery in Berdychiv, May 2002.

Levi Yitzchok of Berditchev (Full name: Levi Yitzchok Derbarmdiger (Yiddish: דעבאַרמדיקער, lit. 'Levi the Compassionate') or Rosakov; May 25/26, 1740 – October 5, 1809), also known as the holy Berdichever, and the Kedushas Levi, was a Hasidic master and Jewish leader. He was the rabbi of Ryczywół, Żelechów, Pinsk, and Berdychiv, for which he is best known. He was one of the main disciples of the Maggid of Mezritch, and of his disciple Rabbi Shmelke of Nikolsburg, whom he succeeded as rabbi of Ryczywół. He is also the great-grandfather of Israeli artist Isaac Frenkel Frenel.

Levi Yitzchok was known as the "defense attorney" for the Jewish people ("Sneiguron Shel Yisroel"), because he would intercede on their behalf before God. Known for his compassion for every Jew, he was one of the most beloved leaders of Eastern European Jewry. He is considered by some to be the founder of Hasidism in central Poland.

== Life ==
Levi Yitzchak was born on the 29th of Iyar of the year 5500, which corresponds to May 25 or 26 1740 CE to Rabbi Meir (who was the Av Beit Din (head of a rabbinical court) of Zamosc) and Sarah-Sasha Ruskov in Husakiv (Ukrainian: Гусаків), now in Yavoriv Raion, Lviv Oblast (region) of Ukraine. He married Perel.

In 1784 he settled in Berdychiv, Russian Empire, in Ukraine, where he was rabbi until the beginning of the 19th century. Nachman of Breslov called him the Peér (glory) of Israel.

He died on the 25th of Tishrei, 5570 (October 5, 1809) and is buried in the old Jewish cemetery in Berdychiv.

== Works ==
=== Works by Levi Yitzchak ===
- The "supreme" Hasidic classic Kedushas Levi: A commentary on Torah—arranged according to the weekly Torah portion—and the Jewish holidays, expanding upon earlier Hasidic philosophy, as well as Talmud and Midrash. In it, Levi Yitzhak discusses various points of Halakha. It was published first in 1798 and has been reprinted numerous times since. An English translation was first published in 2009, and the first complete translation was published by Mitchell Silk in 2023.
- Beis Levi: his commentary on Pirkei Avos.

=== Secondary works ===
- Levi Yitzhak of Berditchev: Portrait of a Hasidic Master (Hartmore House, 1974)
- The World of A Hasidic Master: Levi Yitzhak of Berditchev (Shapolsky Publishers, 1986)
- Rav Levi Yitzchak of Berditchev (ArtScroll, 2011)
- Loving and Beloved: Tales of Rabbi Levi Yitzhak of Berdichev, Defender of Israel (Menorah Books, 2016) ISBN 9781592644735
- Loving and Beloved: Tales of Rabbi Levi Yitzhak of Berdichev, Defender of Israel (Toby Press, 2016) by Simcha Raz
- Sparks from Berditchov (Feldheim, 2017)
- Defender of the Faithful: The Life and Thought of Rabbi Levi Yitshak of Berdychiv (Blackwell's, 2023) by Arthur Green
