= Velyki Mezhyrichi =

Velyki Mezhyrichi Великі Межирічі
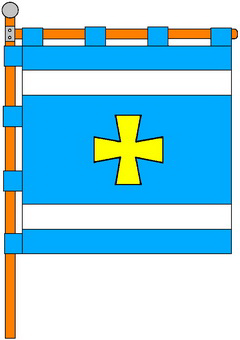
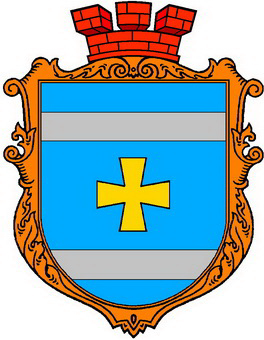
- Flag Coat of arms

- Location within Rivne Oblast Location within Ukraine
- Coordinates: 50°39′24″N 26°51′53″E
- Country: Ukraine
- Oblast: Rivne Oblast
- Raion: Rivne Raion
- Hromada: Velyki Mezhyrichi rural hromada
- Established: 1544

Area
  - Total: 5,441 km^{2} (2,101 sq mi)

Population
  - Total: 2,192
  - Density: 0.4029/km^{2} (1.043/sq mi)
- Time zone: UTC+2 (EET)
  - Summer (DST): UTC+3 (EEST)
- Postal code: 34725
- Area code: +380 3651
- Website: село Великі Межирічі/райцентр Корець/облцентр Рівне ^{(Ukrainian)}

Mezhirichi (Ukrainian: Вели́кі Межи́річі, romanized: Velyki Mezhyrichi; Polish: Wielki Międzyrzecz) is a village in western Ukraine, in the Rivne Raion of Rivne Oblast, but was formerly administered within the Korets Raion. It is located 21 kilometres (13 mi) west of Korets and 43 kilometres (27 mi) east of Rivne. Local government is administered by Velykomezhyritska village council.

== Names ==
Mezhirichi is also known as Polish: Międzyrzec Korecki, Yiddish: מעזריטש, romanized: Mezritsh, Hebrew: מזריטש גדול, romanized: Mezritsh Gadol.

== Jewish life in Mezhirichi ==
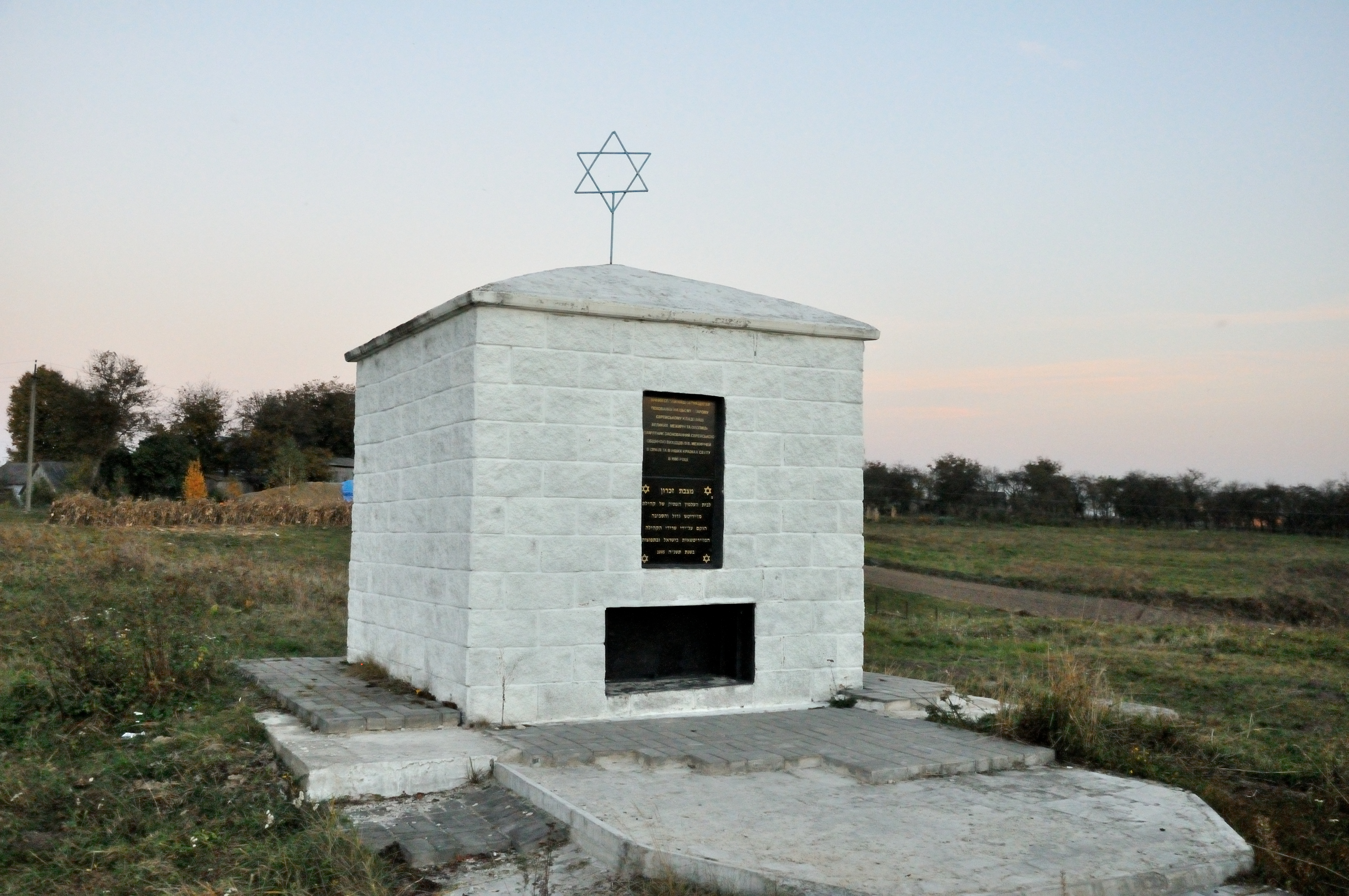
Memorial at the execution site of the Jews of the town.

Undoubtedly the most significant event in the Jewish community of Mezhirichi was the arrival there of the Maggid, Rabbi Dov Ber. After the death of the founder of Hasidism, the Baal Shem Tov, in 1761, Rabbi Dov Ber became the next leader of the movement. He moved to Rivne, and later to Mezhrichi, where he remained for the rest of his life. Mezhrichi rapidly became a magnet and place of pilgrimage for the chasidim. The location of Mezhrichi, nearer to Poland and White Russia than the Baal Shem Tov's seat in Medzhybizh, acted as a spur to the fledgling chasidic movement.

There is a Yizkor book memorializing the Jewish community that lived in the town prior to the Holocaust.

== History ==
Around 15,000 BC, a primeval community in Mezhirich featured dwellings built from mammoth bones, draped with animal hides, hearths filled with charred remnants, and ground surfaces stained with reddish pigments—reflecting early ingenuity and shared living practices.

The first written record of the village dates from 1544. However, archaeologists found in the area a settlement of Bronze Age and the Roman coins of II century AD.

The Magdeburg rights were provided for the village Mezhyrichi by the King of Poland Sigismund III Vasa in 1605. And in 1702 the owner of the village, Jerzy Lubomirski, started to build a stone church of St. Anthony in the village, which took 25 years to erect. The church was built on the place of an old wooden church, which had been erected by means of by Konstantine Ostrogski and which burned down in 1601.

Mezhyrichi was part of the Polish-Lithuanian Commonwealth from 1569, the Russian Empire from 1793, and independent Poland from 1921 to 1939.

On 17 September 1939 Red Army units captured Mezhyrichi from Second Polish Republic, as a result of which the village was annexed into the Soviet Union as part of the Ukrainian SSR.

During WWII German forces occupied the town on July 6, 1941, established a Judenrat, and forced Jews into labor. Massacres took place during Sukkot in 1941 and Shavuot in 1942. About 1,000 surviving Jews were confined to a ghetto and murdered on September 26, 1942; few escaped. No Jews remained after the war.

The 1992 memorial at Tsegelny Ravine, where about 3,000 Jews were murdered during the German occupation, stands at the killing site in Dyven village near Nevirkiv and Velyki Mezhyrichi. Enclosed by a stone fence with a Magen David gate and a large menorah.

== Notable landmarks ==
Monuments of architecture national importance in the Rivne region is the stone church of St. Anthony (N - 1503 0) and Peter and Paul Church (wooden) (N – 1505 0) in the village Velyki Mezhyrichi.

== Gallery ==
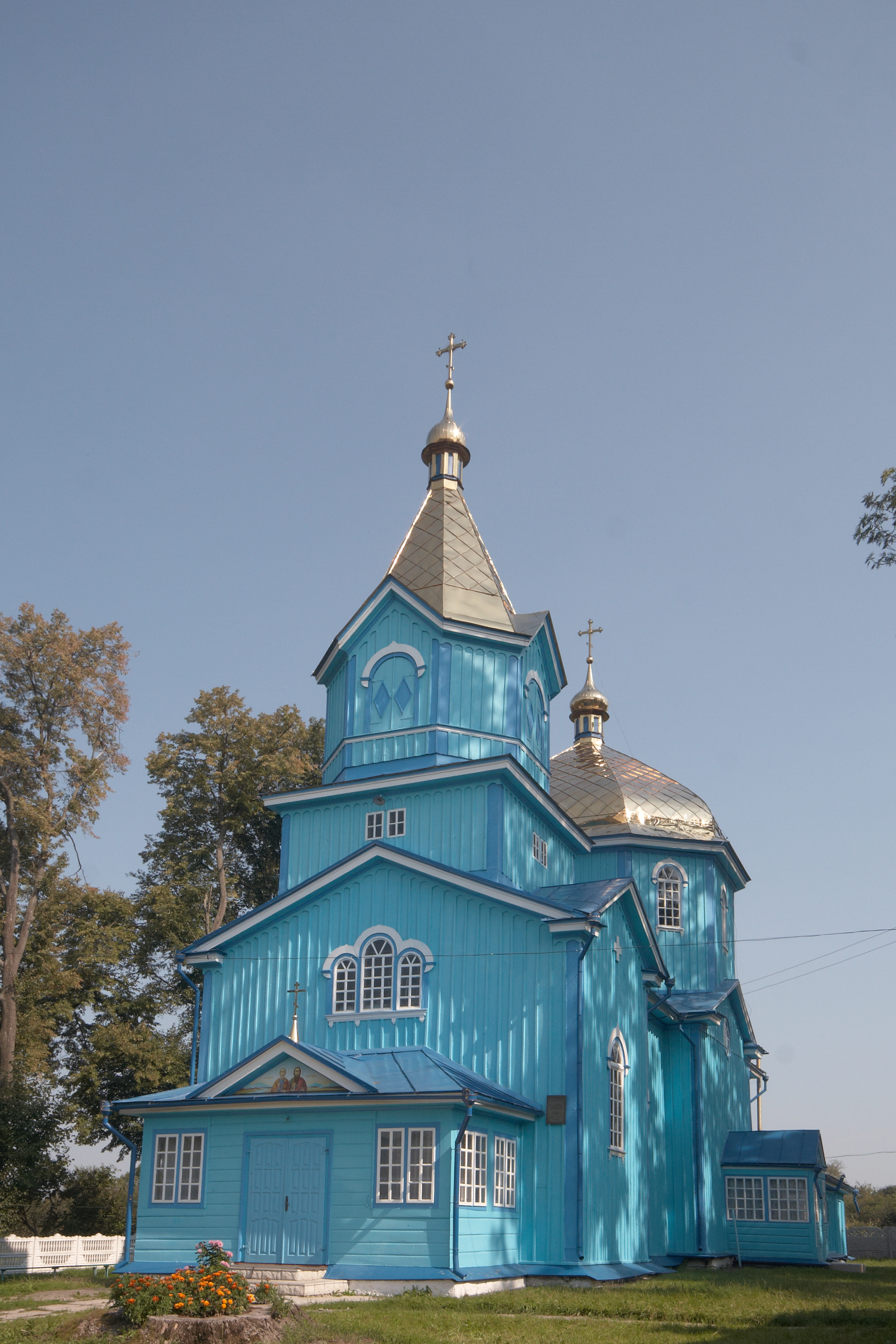
Peter and Paul Church (wooden) in the village Velyki Mezhyrichi.

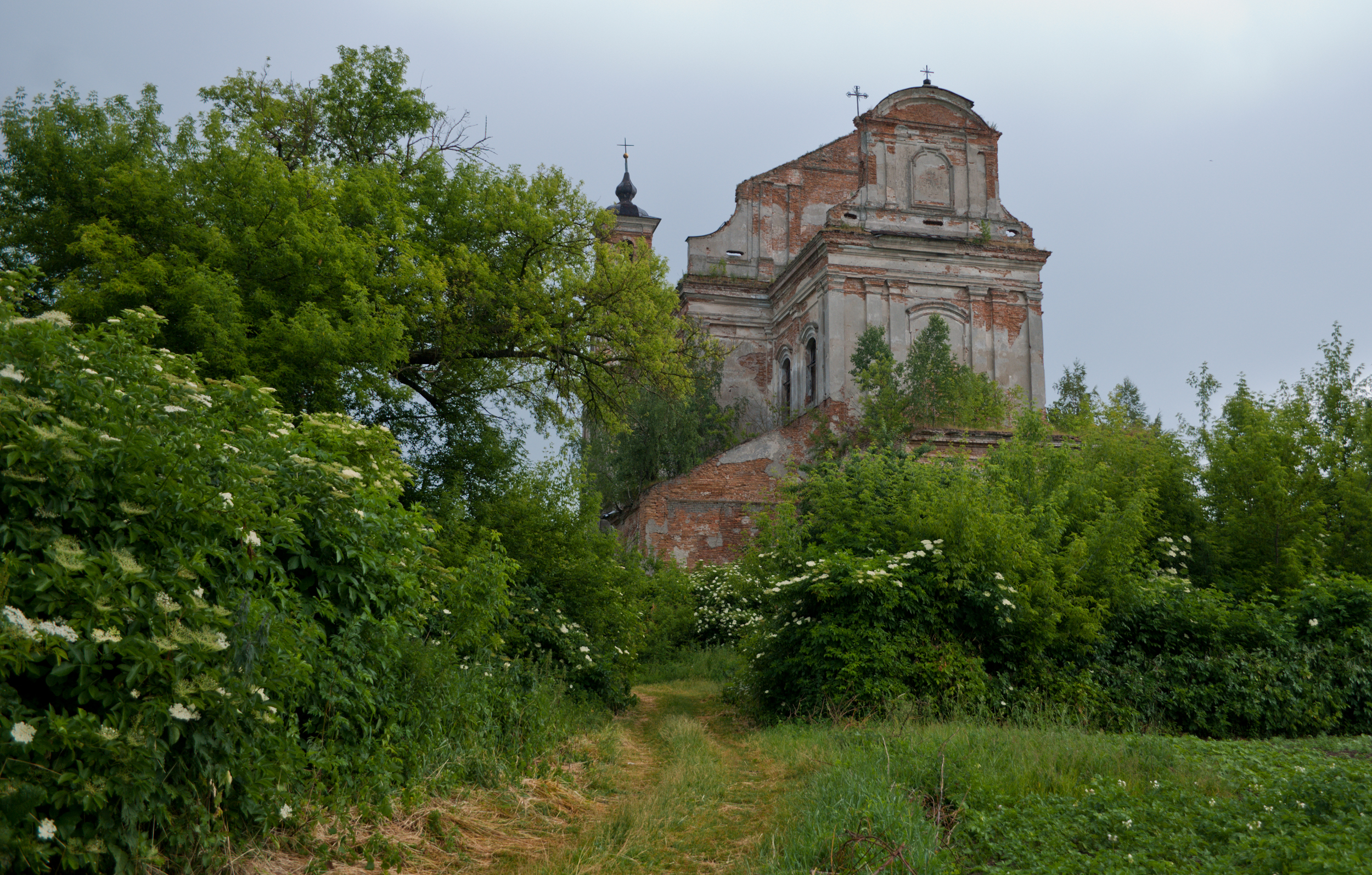
Church of St.Anthony in the village Velyki Mezhyrichi.

== Notable people from Mezhirichi ==
- Dov Ber of Mezeritch, rabbi
- Isaak Ozer Löwenstein, rabbi whose daughter Lina married Edward Eliasz Luxenburg and gave birth to Polish revolutionary socialist Róża Luksemburg.
- Sholom Shachne of Prohobisht (birthplace)
