= Karlin-Stolin (Hasidic dynasty) =

Belarusian Hasidic dynasty

Karlin-Stolin Hasidic Dynasty
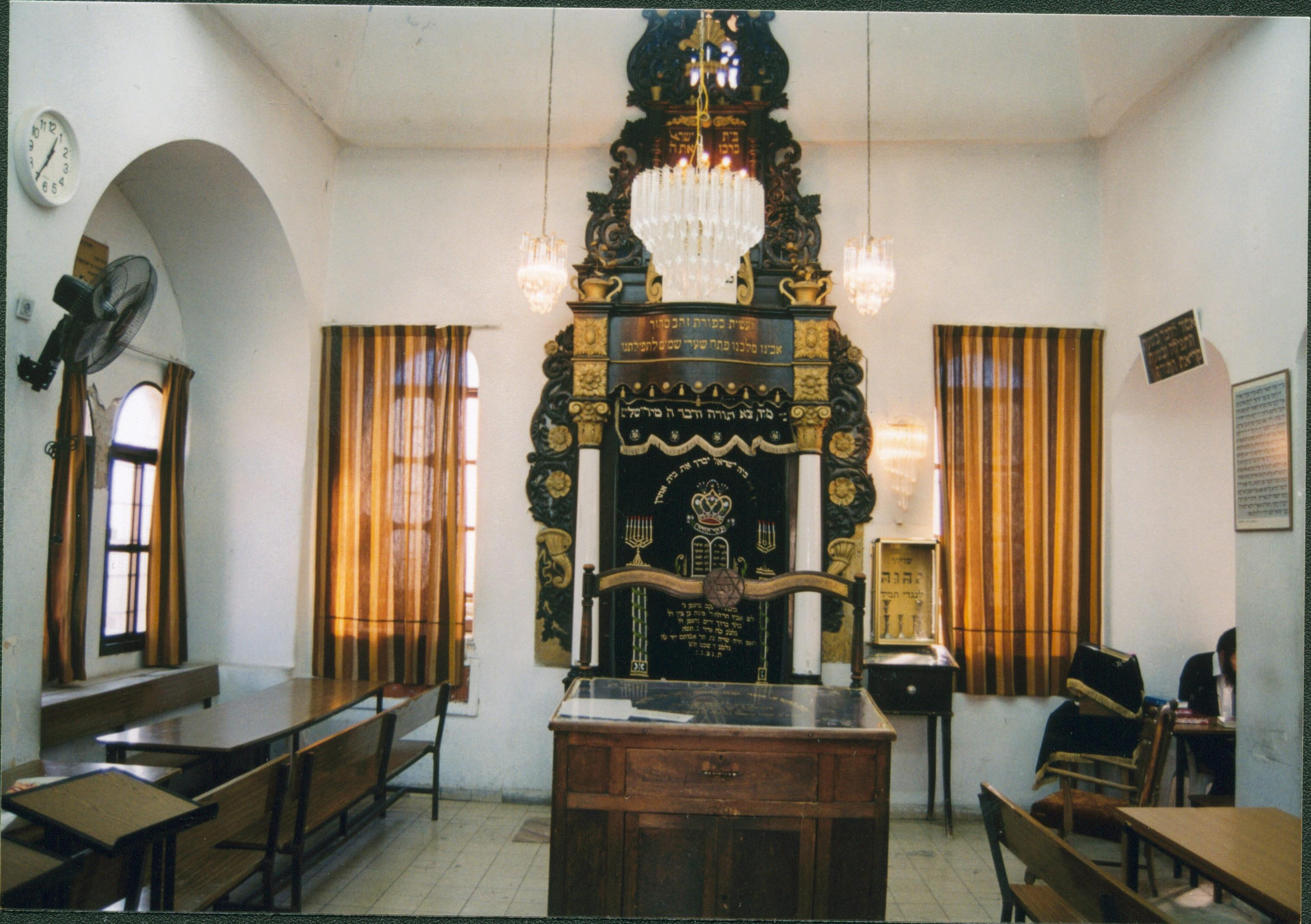
- Karlin-Stolin synagogue, Tiberias

Total population
- 2,200 families

Founder
- Rabbi Aaron ben Jacob of Karlin

Regions with significant populations
- Israel, United States, Russia, England, Mexico, Ukraine

Religions
- Hasidic Judaism

Karlin-Stolin is a Hasidic dynasty, originating with Rebbe Aaron ben Jacob of Karlin in present-day Belarus, and later expanded to nearby Stolin. One of the first centres of Hasidim to be set up in Lithuania, many Lithuanian Hasidic groups are its offshoots. After the murder of many of its followers by Nazi Germany in the Holocaust, the dynasty continued to exist with followers in Israel, the United States, Russia, England, Canada, and Ukraine.

== History ==
In the mid-19th century, members of the Karlin-Stolin dynasty immigrated to Eretz Yisrael (the land of Israel), settling in Tiberias, Hebron, and Safed. In 1869 they took over the site of a former synagogue in Tiberias built in 1786 by Rabbi Menachem Mendel of Vitebsk which had been destroyed in the Galilee earthquake of 1837. Reconstruction commenced in 1870. Around this time, Karlin-Stolin Hasidim began to settle in Jerusalem. By 1874, they had established the Beis Aharon Synagogue of Karlin-Stolin in the old city.

Today, most of the Karlin-Stolin Hasidim reside in or around Jerusalem. There are also synagogues in Beitar Illit, Bnei Brak, Kiryat Sefer, Brachfeld, Safed, and Tiberias, as well as in the United States, in Borough Park, Brooklyn, Monsey, New York, Los Angeles, California, Lakewood, New Jersey, London, Ukraine and Belarus.

The Karlin-Stoliner rebbe (also referred to as the "Stoliner Rebbe"), Boruch Meir Yaakov Shochet, resides in Givat Ze'ev.

In Jerusalem some of the Karliner Hasidim wear the traditional garb of Jerusalem Haredim on Shabbat, the golden caftan. The version of the prayer book used by Karliner Hasidim is called Beis Aharon V'Yisrael. It is the second published prayer book produced by Karliner Hasidim; the first was published in New York City by the then-rebbe, Yochanan Perlow of Karlin-Stolin.

The institutional center of the dynasty in Jerusalem is located in a historic building which was formerly the home of James Finn, the 19th century British consul. Funding for the purchase of the building was provided by the Ministry of Education and local authorities. Renovations were supervised by the architect David Kroyanker. During the construction work, an ancient columbarium was discovered on the site.

== Lineage of the Karliner Dynasty ==
- Rabbi Aaron ben Jacob of Karlin (1736–1772), founder of the dynasty
  - Rabbi Shlomo HaLevi of Karlin (1738–1792), disciple of the above.
    - Rabbi Asher Perlow I of Stolin (1760–1826), son of the founder.
      - Rabbi Aaron ben Asher Perlow of Karlin (1802–1872), son of the above.
        - Rabbi Asher Perlow II of Stolin (d. 1873), son of the above.
          - Rabbi Yisrael Perlow of Stolin, given the nickname "The Frankfurter" because he is buried in Frankfurt, a.k.a. the "Yenuka of Stolin" (1868–1921), son of the above.
            - Rabbi Asher Perlow of Stolin, son of Yisrael Perlow of Stolin.
            - Rabbi Aaron Perlow of Warsaw, son of Yisrael Perlow of Stolin.
            - Rabbi Yaakov Chaim Perlow of Stolin ("The Detroiter") (d. 1946), son of Yisrael Perlow of Stolin.
            - Rabbi Moshe Perlow of Stolin (d. 1942), son of The Frankfurter.
            - Rabbi Avrohom Elimelech Perlow of Karlin (was rebbe in Israel, and went back to Europe; killed in 1942), son of The Frankfurter.
            - Rabbi Yochanan Perlow of Stolin Loitzk (1900–1956), later the Grand Rebbe of Karlin-Stolin in America & youngest son of Yisrael Perlow of Stolin
              - Feiga Perlow (m. Rabbi Ezra Shochet), daughter of Yochanan
                - Rabbi Baruch Meir Yaakov Shochet (born 1955), son of Ezra Shochet
