= Dov Ber of Mezeritch =

Hasidic rabbi (1704–1772)

- Title: Maggid of Mezeritch

Personal life
- Born: Dov Ber ben Avraham; 1704 Lokachi, Volhynian Voivodeship, Polish–Lithuanian Commonwealth
- Died: 4 December 1772 O.S. / 15 December 1772 N.S. / Yahrzeit 19 Kislev, 5533 Hannopil, Volhynian Voivodeship, Polish–Lithuanian Commonwealth
- Children: Avraham HaMalach
- Parent: Avraham (father)
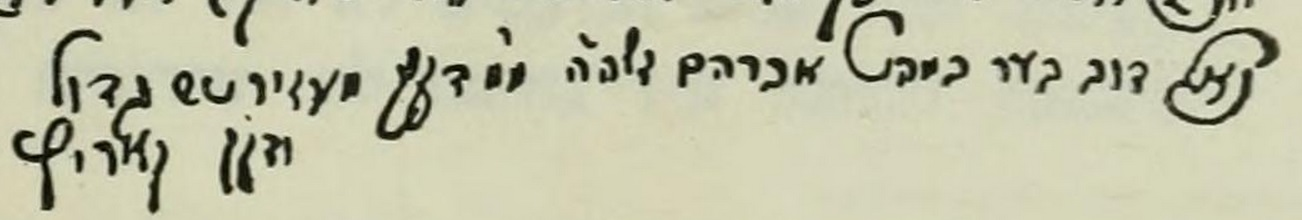
- Signature

Religious life
- Religion: Judaism

Jewish leader
- Predecessor: Baal Shem Tov

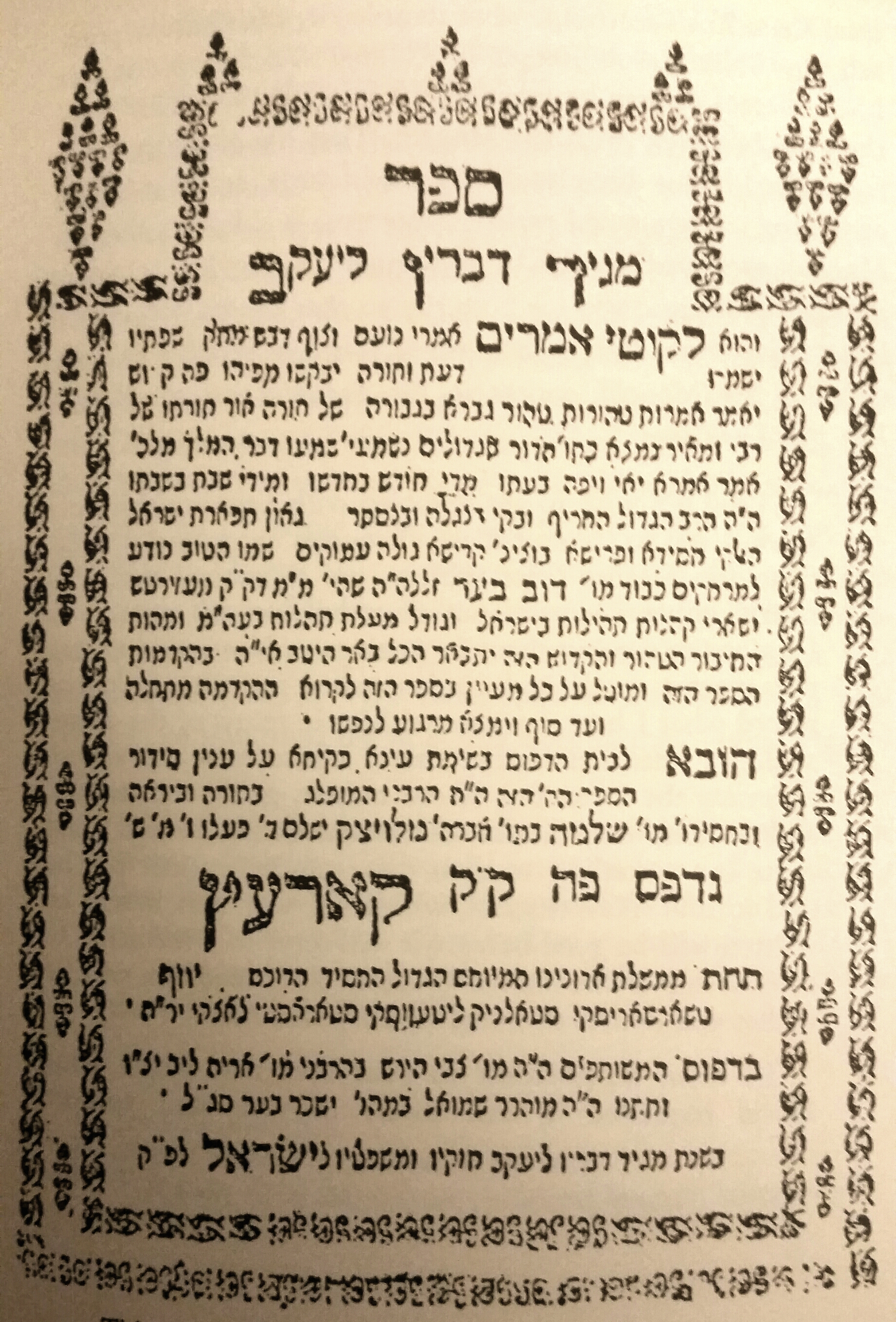
Title page of Maggid Devarav L'Yaakov (Korets, 1781 edition).

Dov Ber ben Avraham of Mezeritch (Yiddish: דֹב בּער פֿון מעזעריטש; died December 4, 1772 O.S.), also known as the Maggid of Mezeritch or Mezeritcher Maggid, was a disciple of Rabbi Israel ben Eliezer (the Baal Shem Tov), the founder of Hasidic Judaism, and was chosen as his successor to lead the early movement. Dov Ber is regarded as the first systematic exponent of the mystical philosophy underlying the teachings of the Baal Shem Tov, and through his teaching and leadership, the main architect of the movement.

He established his base in Mezhirichi (in Volhynia), which moved the centre of Hasidism from Medzhybizh (in Podolia), where he focused his attention on raising a close circle of disciples to spread the movement. After his death the third generation of leadership took their different interpretations and disseminated across appointed regions of Eastern Europe, rapidly spreading Hasidism beyond Ukraine, to Poland, Galicia and Russia.

His teachings appear in Magid Devarav L'Yaakov, Or Torah, Likutim Yekarim, Or Ha'emet, Kitvei Kodesh, Shemuah Tovah, and in the works authored by his disciples. His inner circle of disciples, known as the Chevraia Kadisha ("Holy Brotherhood"), included Rabbis Avraham HaMalach (his son), Nachum of Czernobyl, Elimelech of Lizhensk, Zusha of Hanipol, Levi Yitzchok of Berditchev, Boruch of Medzhybizh, Aharon (HaGadol) of Karlin, Chaim Chaykl of Amdur, Menachem Mendel of Vitebsk, Shmuel Shmelke of Nikolsburg, Shlomo Flam (the Lutzker Maggid), Asher Zebi of Ostrowo, Zev Wolf of Zhitomyr, and Shneur Zalman of Liadi.

== Name ==
The most common transliterations are Dov-Ber, Dov Baer and DovBer; rarely used forms are Dob Ber or Dobh Ber, which often depend on the region in Eastern Europe where Jews resided and hence the influence of the local Yiddish dialects. The name דוב-בער Dov-Ber is traceable back to the Hebrew: דב, romanized: dov, lit. 'bear', and Yiddish: בער, romanized: ber, lit. 'bear'. It is thus an example of a bilingual tautological name.

Dov Ber of Mezeritch was known as the Maggid—"Preacher" or literally "Sayer," one who preaches and admonishes to go in God's ways—of Mezritsh (the German form Meseritz is sometimes used instead of Mezeritch). Towards the end of his life he was also known as the Maggid of Rivne, the town where he was buried.

== Biography ==
Dov Ber was born in Lokachi, Volhynia in 1710, according to the Jewish Encyclopedia, though his year of birth is unknown and some sources place it around 1700. Little is known about him before he became a disciple of the Baal Shem Tov. A Hasidic legend states that, when he was five years old, his family home burst into flames. On hearing his mother weeping, he asked: "Mother, do we have to be so unhappy because we have lost a house?" She replied that she was mourning the family tree, which was destroyed, and is traced to King David by way of Rabbi Yohanan, the sandal-maker and master in the Talmud. The boy replied: "And what does that matter! I shall get you a new family tree which begins with me!"

When he was young, he reportedly lived in great poverty with his wife. One legend relates that when a child was born, they had no money to pay the midwife. His wife complained and the Maggid went outside to "curse" Israel. He went outside and said: "O children of Israel, may abundant blessings come upon you!" When his wife complained a second time, he went outside again and cried: "Let all happiness come to the children of Israel—but they shall give their money to thorn bushes and stones!" The baby was too weak to cry, and the Maggid sighed rather than "cursing". Immediately the answer came, and a voice said: "You have lost your share in the coming world." The Maggid replied: "Well, then, the reward has been done away with. Now I can begin to serve in good earnest."

== Death ==
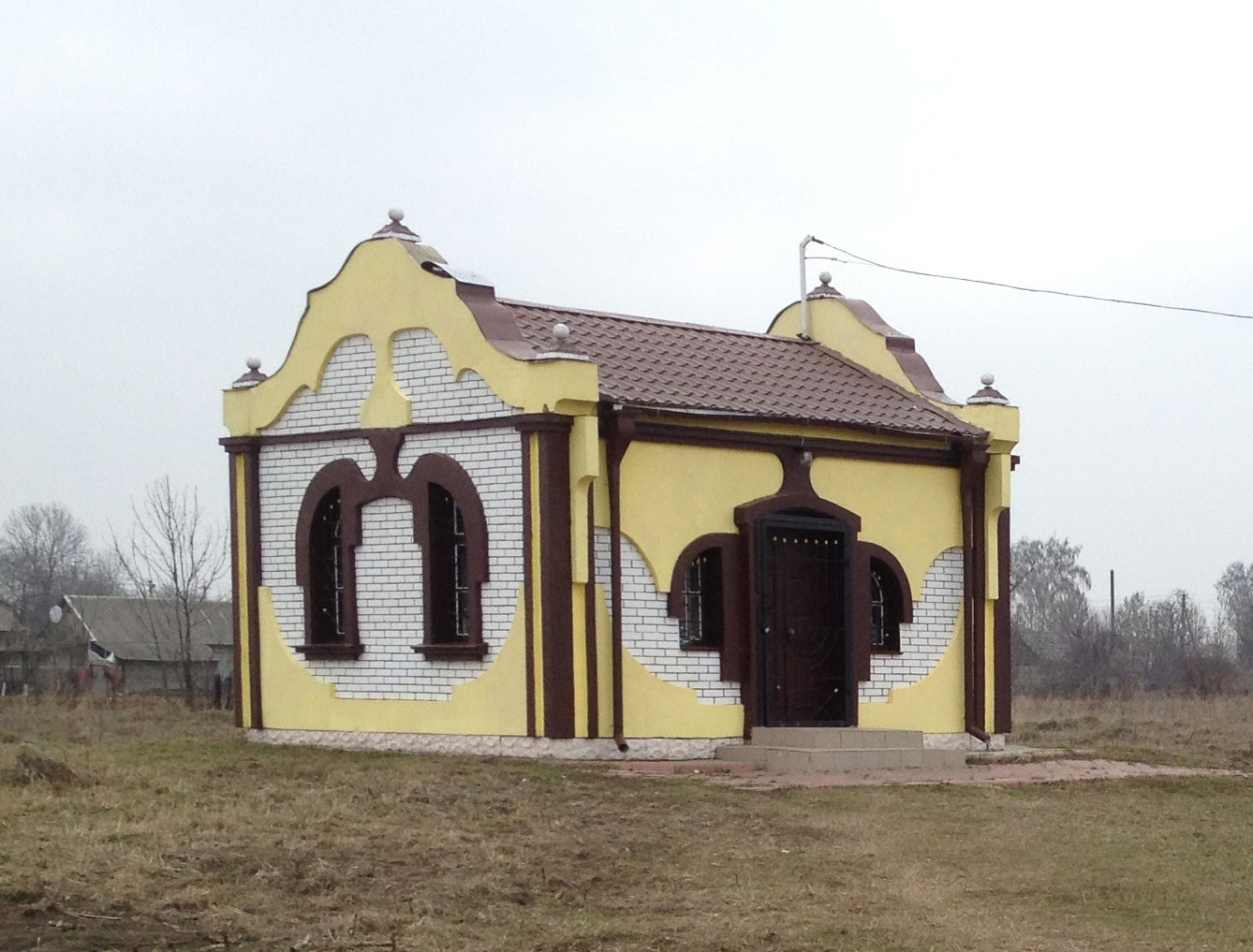
Mausoleum in Hanipol where he is buried alongside Zusha of Hanipol

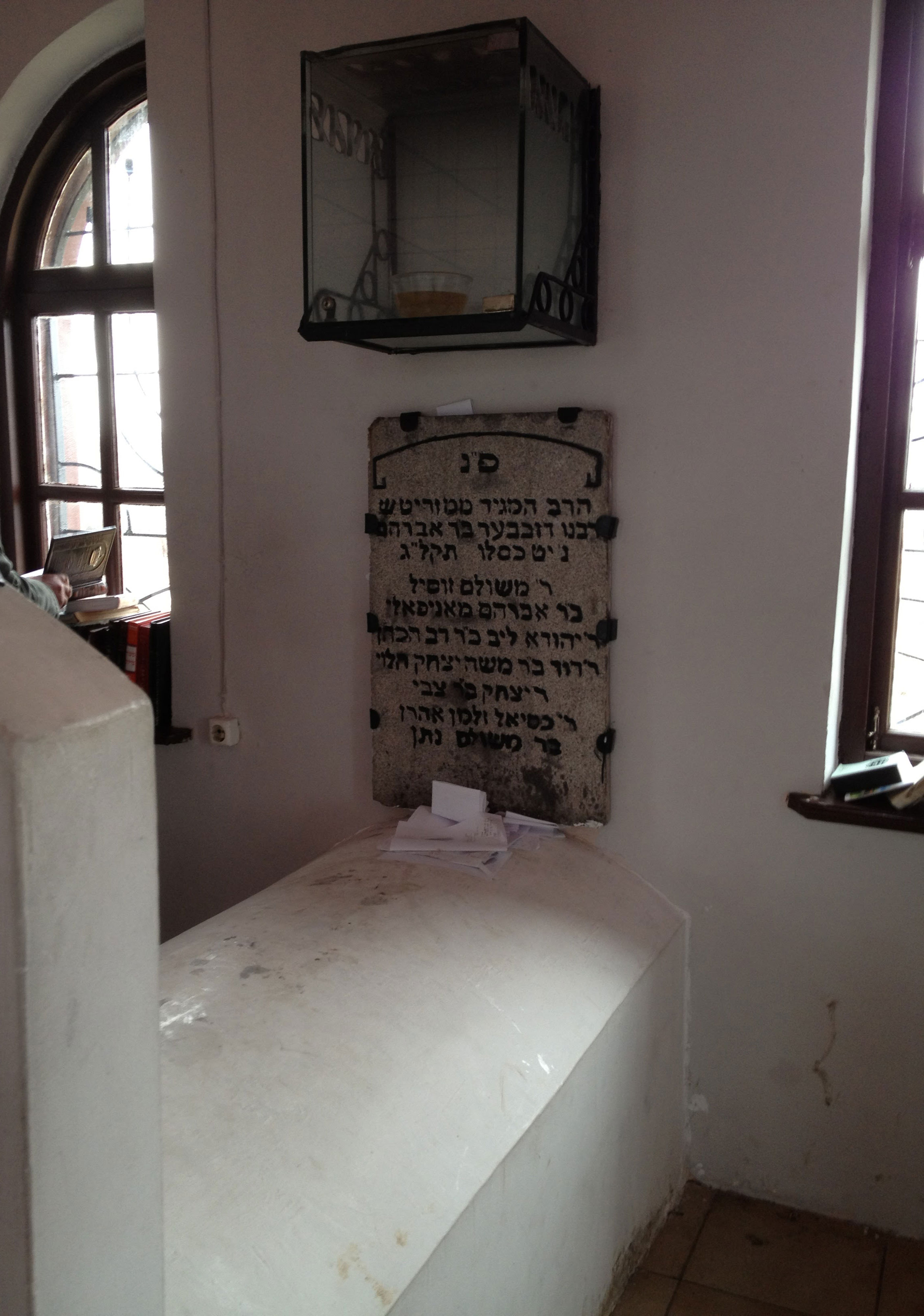

He is buried in Hannopil, beside Zusha of Hanipol.

== Visit to Baal Shem Tov ==
Dov Ber was originally a student of the Pnei Yehoshua later became an admirer of Isaac Luria's system of Kabbalah, which was becoming popular at that time, and was aware of Moshe Chaim Luzzatto, whose writings, then only in manuscript, were well known among the Polish mystics of the period. Dov Ber followed the Lurian school, living the life of an ascetic, fasting a great deal, praying intensely, and living in poverty. He is reported to have become a cripple as a result of poor nourishment.

One account has it that on account of his poor health he was persuaded to seek out the Baal Shem Tov for a cure. He arrived at the Baal Shem Tov's house, expecting to hear expositions of profound mysteries, but instead was told stories of the latter's everyday life. Hearing only similar stories at each subsequent visit, Dov Ber decided to return home. Just as he was about to leave, he was summoned again to the Baal Shem Tov's house. The Baal Shem Tov opened an "Eitz Chaim" of Rabbi Chaim Vital (Rabbi Isaac Luria's chief disciple), and asked him to explain a certain passage. Dov Ber did so to the best of his ability, but the Baal Shem Tov declared that he had not understood the real meaning of the passage. Dov Ber reviewed it once more and insisted that his interpretation was correct. The Baal Shem Tov then proceeded to explain the passage himself. Legend has it that, as he spoke, the darkness suddenly gave way to light, and angels appeared and listened to the Baal Shem Tov's words. "Your explanations," he said to Dov Ber, "were correct, but your deductions were thoughts without any soul in them." This experience persuaded Dov Ber to stay with the Baal Shem Tov.

Dov Ber is reported to have learned from the Baal Shem Tov to value everyday things and events, and to emphasize the proper attitude with which to study Torah. The mystical philosophy of the Baal Shem Tov rejected the emphasis on mortification of the body in Musar and Kabbalistic traditions, seeing the greater spiritual advantage in transforming the material into a vehicle for holiness, rather than breaking it. This could be achieved by the perception of the omnipresent Divine immanence in all things, from understanding the inner mystical Torah teachings of Hasidic thought. Under the guidance of the Baal Shem Tov, Dov Ber abandoned his ascetic lifestyle, and recovered his health, though his left foot remained lame. The Baal Shem Tov said that "before Dov Ber came to me, he was already a pure golden menorah (candelebrum). All I needed to do was ignite it." Regarding his holiness, the Baal Shem Tov also reputedly said that if Dov Ber had not been lame, and had been able to ritually immerse in the mikvah, then he could have been able to bring the Mashiach.

== Hasidic leadership ==
Suddenly, Reb Tzvi got up and said, “My father appeared and told me that the Shechina now dwells in Mezritch.” Then Reb Tzvi removed the white cloak of leadership and put it onto the shoulders of Reb Dov Ber of Mezritch. And so, Reb Dov Ber, who later became known as the Mezritcher Maggid, assumed leadership of the Chassidic movement. And so it was

Immediately after the death of the Baal Shem Tov in 1760, his son Rabbi Tsvi became the next Rebbe. After only a year he gave up this position. Among the disciples of the Baal Shem Tov, two stood out as contenders to succeed him, Dov Ber and Yacov Yoseph of Polonne. Yacov Yoseph would later become the author of the first Hasidic book published ("Toldos Yaacov Yosef" in 1780), one of the most direct records of the teachings of the Baal Shem Tov. By collective consent, the Maggid assumed the leadership of Hasidism. In effect he became the architect of the Hasidic movement and is responsible for its successful dissemination.

The Maggid was housebound because of his poor physical condition. Jewish philosopher Solomon Maimon records an encounter with the Maggid in his memoirs, in which he passes a strong negative judgement on the Hasidic movement. He relates that the Maggid passed the entire week in his room, permitting only a few confidants to enter. He appeared in public only on Shabbat, dressed in white satin. On those occasions he prayed with people, and kept open house for anyone who wanted to dine with him. After the meal he would reportedly begin to chant, and placing his hand upon his forehead, would ask those present to quote any verse from the Bible. These served as texts for the Maggid's subsequent sermon. Solomon Maimon wrote: "He was such a master in his craft that he combined these disjointed verses into an harmonious whole." Historian David Assaf studied the sermons quoted by Maimon and found that they are indeed attributed to The Maggid in other sources, indicating that the meeting between them did in fact take place.

He attracted a remarkable group of scholarly and saintly disciples, including most of his fellow students of the Baal Shem Tov. The Baal Shem Tov had travelled across Jewish areas, reaching out to and inspiring the common folk, whose sincerity he cherished. He sought to revive the broken spirit of the simple Jews. At the same time, he would also seek out the great scholars of Talmud and Kabbalah, to win them over to Hasidism, to whom he taught the inner meaning of his teachings. Many Hasidic tales relate the stories of the Baal Shem Tov's travels, accompanied by his close disciples, and led by his non-Jewish wagon driver. Dov Ber, in contrast, set up his court in Mezhirichi, where his lameness restricted him, and devoted his main focus to articulating the mystical-philosophical system within the Baal Shem Tov's teachings to his close circle of disciples, who would lead the future movement. The simple folk were also able to visit during the Sabbath public attendancies of Dov Ber, and receive spiritual encouragement and comfort. The Maggid's court became the spiritual seat and place of pilgrimage of the second generation of the Hasidic movement, and moved its centre north from the Baal Shem Tov's residence in Medzhybizh. This move benefited the growth of the movement, as it was closer to new territories in Galicia, Poland and Belarus to reach. It was also nearer to the centre of Rabbinic opposition in Lithuania, who perceived of the new movement as a spiritual threat. The disciples of Dov Ber related that:

With the move of Rabbi Dov Ber, the Shechina (Divine Presence) "Packed up Her belongings and moved from Medzhybizh to Mezeritch, and all we can do is follow"

The elite group of disciples, the "Chevraya Kaddisha" ("Holy Society"), included Rabbis Aharon of Karlin, Menachem Mendel of Vitebsk, Levi Yitzchok of Berditchev, Elimelech of Lizhensk, Zusha of Hanipol, Shmelka (later Chief Rabbi of Nikolsburg), Pinchas Horowitz (later Chief Rabbi of Frankfurt-am-Main and author of profound Talmudic commentaries), and Shneur Zalman of Liadi (author of the Tanya, and by instructions of his master, author of an updated version of the Shulchan Aruch code of Jewish Law for the new movement). These disciples, being themselves great Talmudic authorities and well-versed in Kabbalah and Hasidic philosophy, were successful in turning Hasidus into a vast movement.

== Opposition of the rabbis ==
Hasidism spread rapidly as a result of Dov Ber's powerful personality, gaining footholds in Volhynia, Lithuania, and Ukraine. The dissolution of the "Four-Lands" synod in 1764 proved favorable to its spread. The local rabbis were annoyed by the growth of the movement, but could not easily do anything about it. The Gaon of Vilna was the only rabbi whose reputation extended beyond the borders of Lithuania. When Hasidism appeared in Vilna, the Vilna Gaon enacted the first major excommunication against Hasidism, which was issued on April 11, 1772. The Vilna Gaon believed the movement was antagonistic to Talmudic rabbinism and was suspicious that it was a remnant of the recent Sabbatean movement. See Hasidim and Mitnagdim.

The Maggid's pupils Rabbi Menachem Mendel of Vitebsk and Rabbi Shneur Zalman of Liadi tried to visit the Vilna Gaon to bring about reconciliation, but the Vilna Gaon declined to meet them. Lubavitch legend has it that had the Gaon met with these two Rabbis, the Mashiach (Messiah) would have come.

The ban issued at Vilna drew the eyes of the world toward Hasidism. Rabbi Dov Ber ignored the opposition, but it is blamed in part for his death in Mezhirichi on December 15, 1772.

== Views and teachings ==
=== Published writings ===
The Maggid left no writings of his own. Many of his teachings were recorded by his disciples and appeared in anthologies "MaggiD DebarO le-Ya'akoV" (מגיד דבריו ליעקב the last letters of which title spell "Dov"), known also under the title of Likkutei Amarim ("Collected Sayings"), published at Korets in 1780 (second edition with additions Korets, 1784), and frequently reprinted; Likkutim Yekarim ("Precious Collections"), published at Lemberg in 1792; Or Torah (the largest collection) published in Korets, 1804; Or Ha'emet published in Husiatin, 1899; Kitvei Kodesh (small collection) published in Lemberg. 1862; Shemu'ah Tovah (small collection) published in Warsaw. 1938. A number of manuscripts with additional teachings are in the National Library of the Hebrew University. They consist of excerpts from his sermons, transcribed and compiled by his students. The first to be published (Likkutei Amarim) was collated by his relative, Rabbi Shlomo Flam of Lutzk, who, as he himself notes, was unhappy with the manuscript but did not have time to edit it properly.

There is a great deal of overlapping between all these texts, but each contains teachings that do not appear in the others. Work and editing has been done on them: Maggid Devarav Layaakov was edited by Rabbi Avraham Yitzchak Kohn (Jerusalem, 1961). Later, a critical edition was edited by Prof. Rivkah Shatz-Uffenheimer (Hebrew University, Jerusalem, 1976). Kehot Publishing of Chabad put out another edition edited by Rabbi Jacob Immanuel Schochet (Brooklyn, NY, 2008). These editions all contain introductions, annotations and indices. Or Torah has appeared in an annotated edition with introduction, commentaries, cross-references and indices, authored by Schochet (Brooklyn, NY, 2006). Likkutim Yekarim is in annotated edition by Rabbi Avraham Yitzchak Kohn (Jerusalem, 1974).

=== View of God ===
For the Maggid, God manifests Himself in creation, which is only one aspect of His activity, and which is therefore in reality a self-limitation. Just as God in His goodness limited Himself, and thus descended to the level of the world and man, so it is the duty of the latter to strive to unite with God. The removal of the outer shell of mundane things, or "the ascension of the [divine] spark," being a recognition of the presence of God in all earthly things, it is the duty of man, should he experience pleasure, to receive it as a divine manifestation, for God is the source of all pleasure.

=== On the ecstasy of prayer ===
Rabbi Dov Ber's view of prayer was that it is the purpose of the life on earth to advance until the perfect union with God is attained. Thus the vegetable kingdom serves as food for the animal kingdom, in order that the lower manifestation of divinity, existing in the former, may be developed into a higher one. Man being the highest manifestation has a duty to attain the highest pinnacle in order to be united with God. The way to achieve this, he argued, is through prayer, in which man forgets himself and his surroundings, and concentrates all his thought and feeling upon union with God.

Like the Neo-Platonists, he said that when a man becomes so absorbed in the contemplation of an object that his whole power of thought is concentrated upon one point, his self becomes unified with that point. So prayer in such a state of real ecstasy, effecting a union between God and man, is extremely important, and may even be able to overcome the laws of nature.

=== Role of the tzadik ===
Rabbi Dov Ber taught that only the tzadik is able to remove all his thoughts from earthly things and concentrate completely on God. Because of his union with God, he is the connecting link between God and creation, and thus the channel of blessing and mercy. The love that men have for the tzadik provides a path to God. The duty of the ordinary mortal is therefore to love the tzadik and be a student of his. In this connection Hasidim cite the classical Jewish teaching that Scripture considers one who serves Torah scholars to be cleaving to the Almighty Himself.

== See also ==
- Amshinov (Hasidic dynasty)
- Chabad
- Boyan (Hasidic dynasty)
- Ruzhin (Hasidic dynasty)
- List of Hasidic dynasties
- Levi Yitzchok of Berditchev
- Nachum of Czernobyl

Religious titles
Preceded by Rebbe Baal Shem Tov	Hasidic Rebbes; 1760–1772	Succeeded by Rebbe Elimelech of Lizhensk, Rabbi Shneur Zalman of Liadi, Rebbe Aharon HaGadol of Karlin, Rabbi Levi Yitzchok of Berditchev, Rabbi Zusha of Hanipol, Rabbi Menachem Mendel of Vitebsk
