= Menachem Mendel of Vitebsk =

Early leader of Hasidic Judaism

Personal life
- Born: c. 1730 Vitebsk (?)
- Died: 1788 Tiberias, Ottoman Syria

Religious life
- Religion: Judaism
- Denomination: Hasidic Judaism

Jewish leader
- Teacher: Maggid of Mezeritch

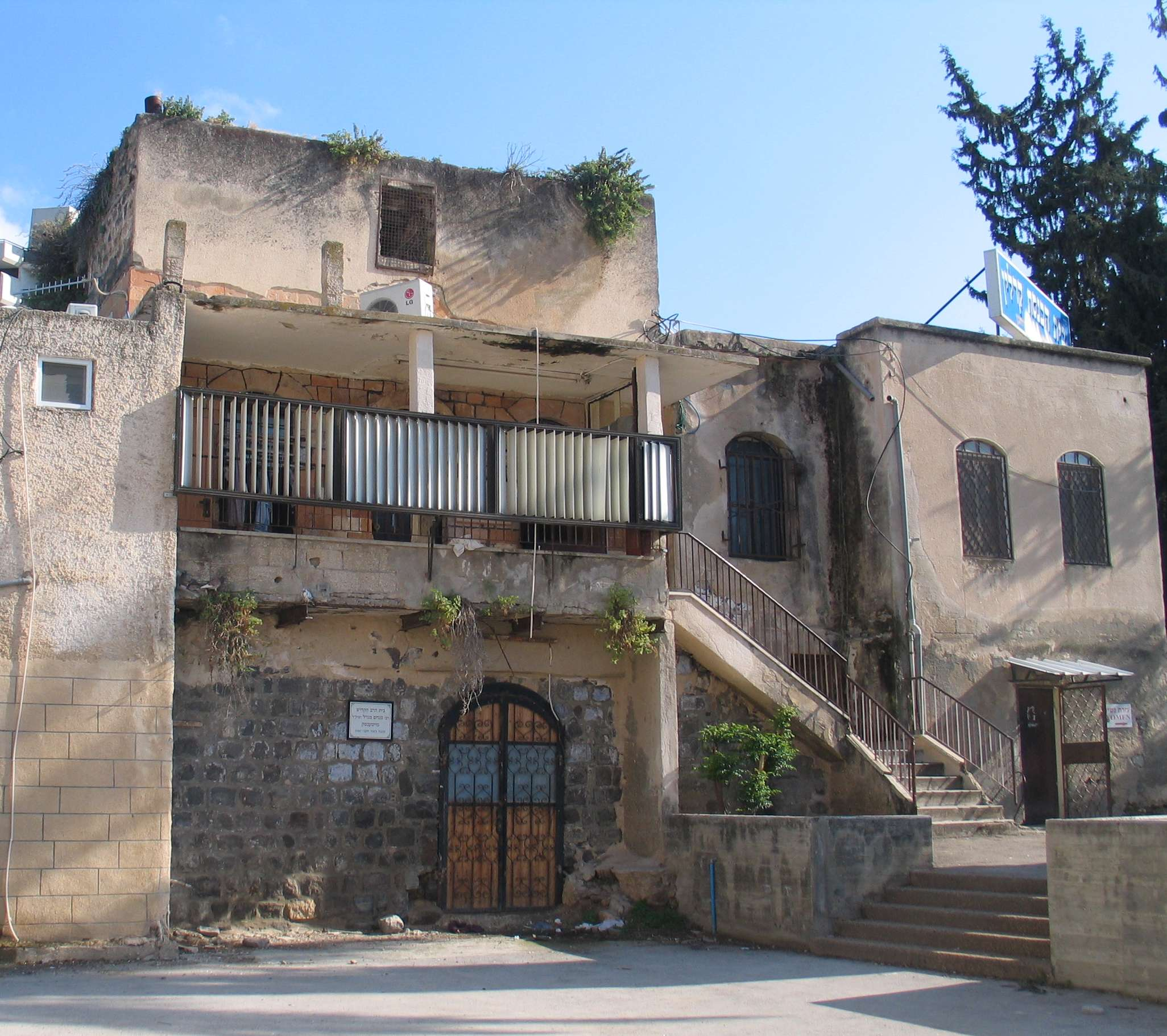
The Karlin synagogue today in Tiberias, Israel.

Menachem Mendel of Vitebsk (1730?–1788), also known as Menachem Mendel of Horodok, was an early leader of Hasidic Judaism. Part of the third generation of Hassidic leaders, he was the primary disciple of the Maggid of Mezeritch.

In 1773, he settled in Vitebsk, and spread Hasidism throughout Belarus.

In the winter of 1772, he - along with Rabbi Shneur Zalman of Liadi (who regarded Rabbi Menachem Mendel as his Rebbe after the Maggid's passing) - went to the Vilna Gaon with the aim of convincing him to rescind his ban on Hasidism, but the Vilna Gaon would not receive them.

After the Maggid's death, Rabbi Menachem Mendel, along with fellow disciple Rabbi Abraham Kalisker ("Kalisker") settled in Horodok.

== Immigration to Israel ==
In 1777 the two, along with 300 followers, emigrated to Eretz Israel, settling in Safed that September after six month of travel. In 1783, the group relocated to Tiberias, after either facing persecution from local Ottoman authorities or because of friction with followers of Sabbatai Zevi. He continued to guide those of his followers remaining in Europe via epistles delivered by emissaries. In 1785, he built a small synagogue in Tiberias which, rebuilt after the Galilee earthquake of 1837, still stands today as the Karlin-Stolin synagogue.

His son, Moshe, married a Sephardi woman from Jerusalem, but he died in 1799.

== Legacy ==
The Tanya (see "Compiler's Preface") is partially based on the works of Rabbi Menachem Mendel.

Menachem Mendel of Vitebsk is the subject of 15 of the stories in Martin Buber's Tales of the Hasidim.

== Works ==
- P'ri Ha'Aretz
- P'ri Ha'Eitz
- Likkutei Amarim
