= Amdur =

Amdur is a Jewish surname derived from the historical Yiddish name, אמדור, Amdur, of Indura, a village in Belarus. Notable people with the surname include

- Galit Baram-Amdur, or Galit Baram (born 1969), Israeli consul
- Ellis Amdur (born 1952), American martial arts writer
- Mary Amdur (1921–1998), American public health researcher

== See also ==
- Amdur (Hasidic dynasty)
- Amdursky
