= Amdursky =

Amdursky (Hebrew: אמדורסקי, sometimes back-transliterated as Amdorsky) is a Russian Jewish toponymic surname derived from the Yiddish name, אמדור, Amdur, of the settlement Indura, now in Belarus.The surname is Indursky is of the same origin. Notable people with the surname include:

- Assaf Amdursky (born 1971), Israeli singer, songwriter and music producer, and son of Benny Amdursky
- Benny Amdursky, Israeli singer from the Israeli duo Dudaim
- Michal Amdursky (born 1975), Israeli dancer and singer, and ex-wife of Assaf Amdursky

== See also ==
- Amdur
