= Shmuel of Amdur =

Rabbi Shmuel ben Chaim Chaykl of Amdur (c. 1755 - 1799) was the second Rebbe of Amdur after succeeding his father Rabbi Chaim Chaykl of Amdur.

== Biography ==
Reb Shmuel of Amdur was born in Indura (Amdur), Belarus and studied under his father and Rabbi Aharon HaGadol of Karlin. After his father's death in 1787, he became the Rebbe of Amdur and subsequently became engrossed in a public debate with Rabbi Yisroel Leibel which also included Rabbi Mordechai Twersky and Rabbi Mordechai of Lechovitch. He reportedly had tense relations with his brother Rabbi Dov Ber of Shedlitz, and a letter to his brother has survived in which states he wished to "remove every obstacle between us.. and also forgiveness is greater than wisdom". Nearing the end of his life Reb Shmuel became a devout follower of Rabbi Shneur Zalman of Liadi, whom most of his followers accepted as their Rebbe after Reb Shmuel's death. Some of his followers accepted Reb Shmuel's two sons as his successors. Reb Shmuel's eldest son, Rabbi Moshe Aaron (known as the Maggid of Vileika), had a Hasidic court in Vileika, while his younger brother Rabbi Chaim Chaykl II had a Hasidic court in Grodno.
