= Indursky =

Indursky (Hebrew: אינדורסקי, Russian: Индурский) is a Russian Jewish toponymic surname derived from the place named Indura, now in Belarus.A similar surname is Amdursky derived from the Yiddish name of the place, אמדור, Amdur. Notable people with the surname include:

- Semyon Indursky (1912–1988), Soviet journalist, editor in chief of Vechernyaya Moskva
- Yehonatan Indursky (born 1984), Israeli filmmaker
