= Treblinka memorial =

Memorial complex at the site of the former Treblinka II extermination camp

- Pomnik Ofiar Obozu Zagłady w Treblince
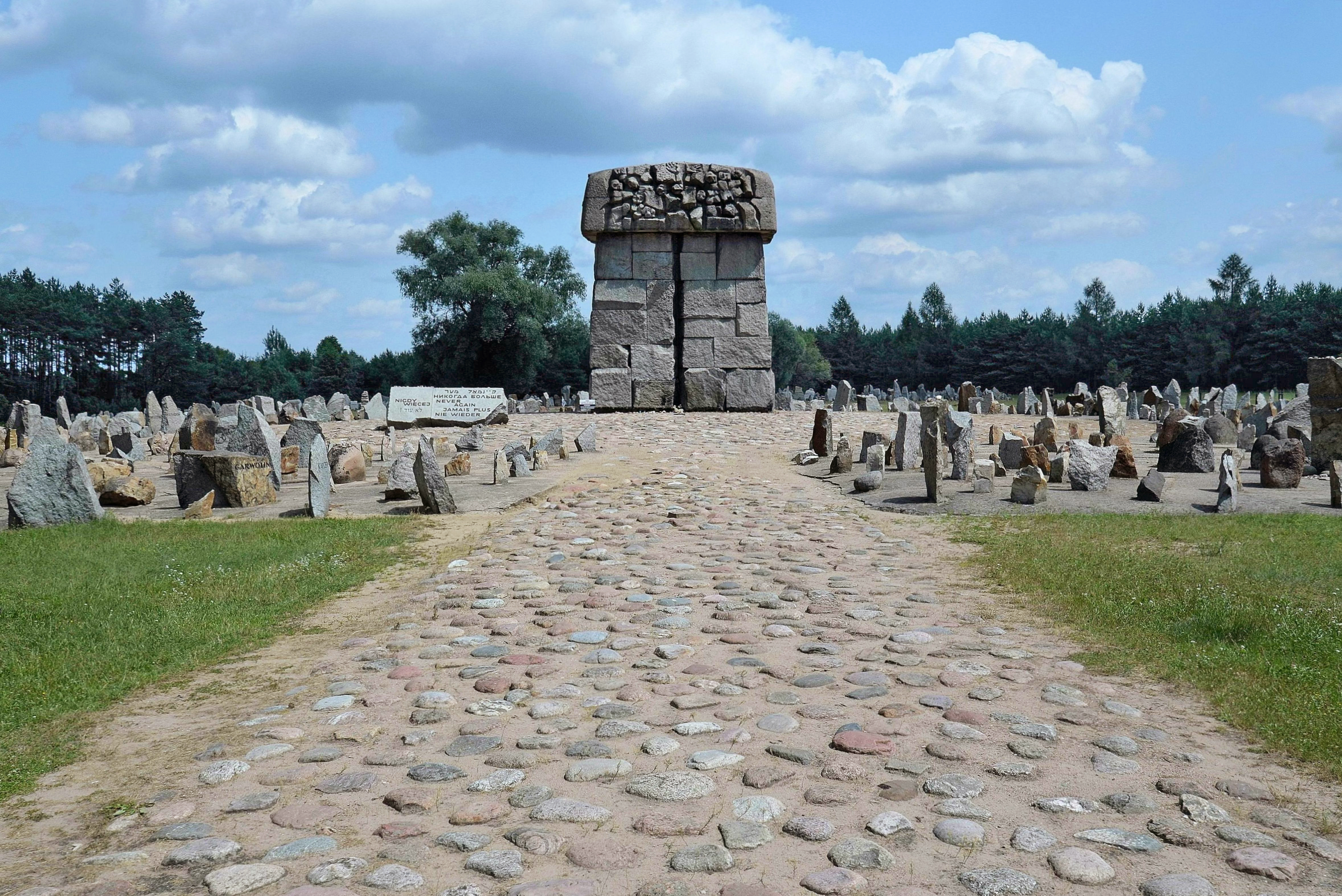
- Monument designed by Franciszek Duszeńko, surrounded by memorial stones
- Interactive map of Treblinka memorial
- Location: Former Treblinka extermination camp, Poland
- Coordinates: 52°37′54.1″N 22°3′9.01″E
- Designer: Franciszek Duszeńko and Adam Haupt
- Type: Memorial complex
- Completion date: 21 April 1958
- Opening date: 10 May 1964
- Restored date: 1978, 1998

The Treblinka memorial is a memorial complex located at the site of the former German Nazi Treblinka extermination camp, dedicated to approximately 800,000 Jews from Poland and other European countries killed there between 1942 and 1943.

Designed by sculptor Franciszek Duszeńko and architect Adam Haupt, the memorial's construction faced delays due to funding shortages and legal documentation issues, taking nearly nine years to complete. It was officially unveiled on 10 May 1964. The memorial is widely regarded as an outstanding example of monumental architecture and one of the most poignant commemorations of the Holocaust in Poland and globally.

== History ==
=== Background ===
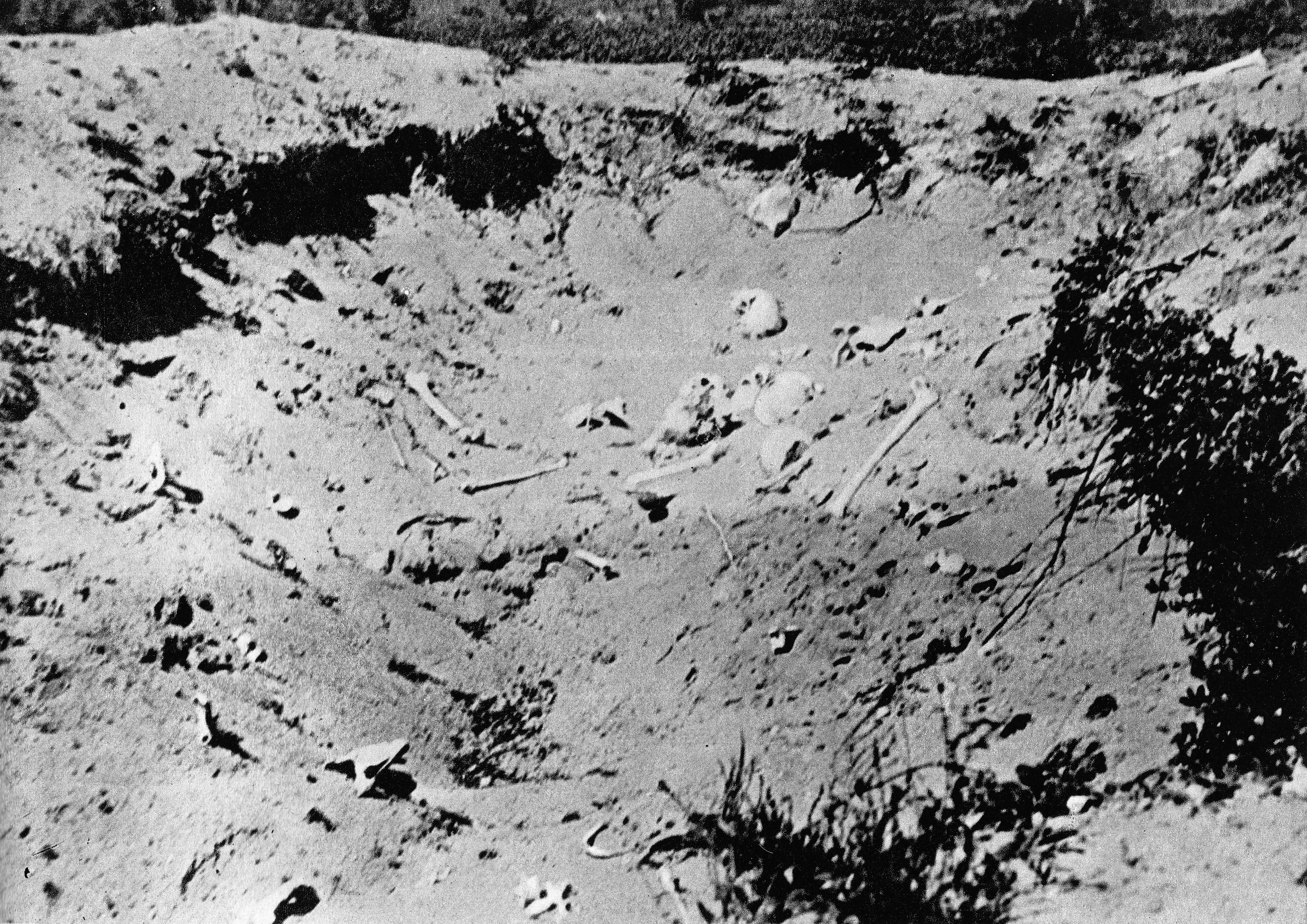
Site of the former camp, photographed in summer 1945

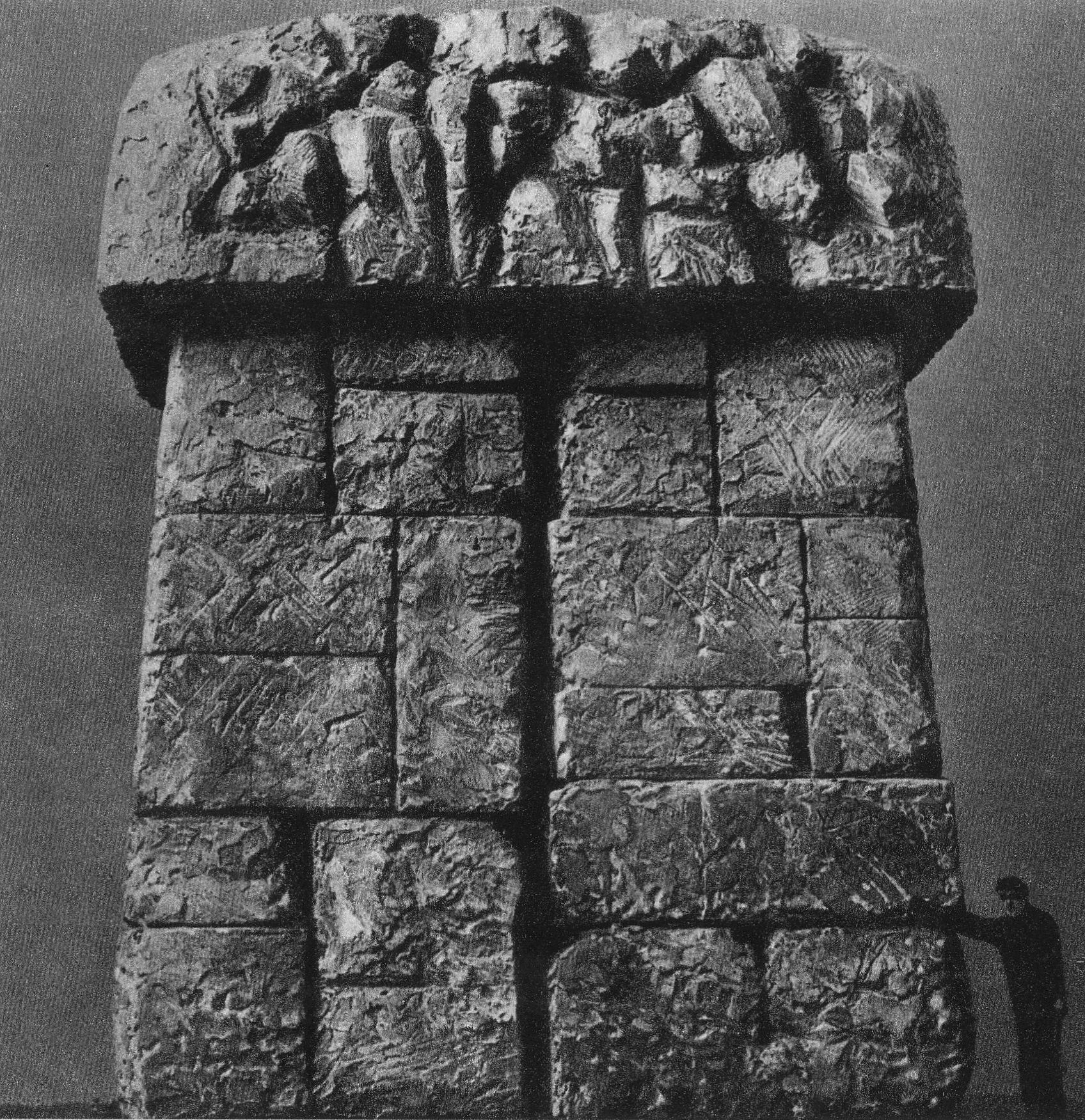
Model of the memorial by Franciszek Duszeńko

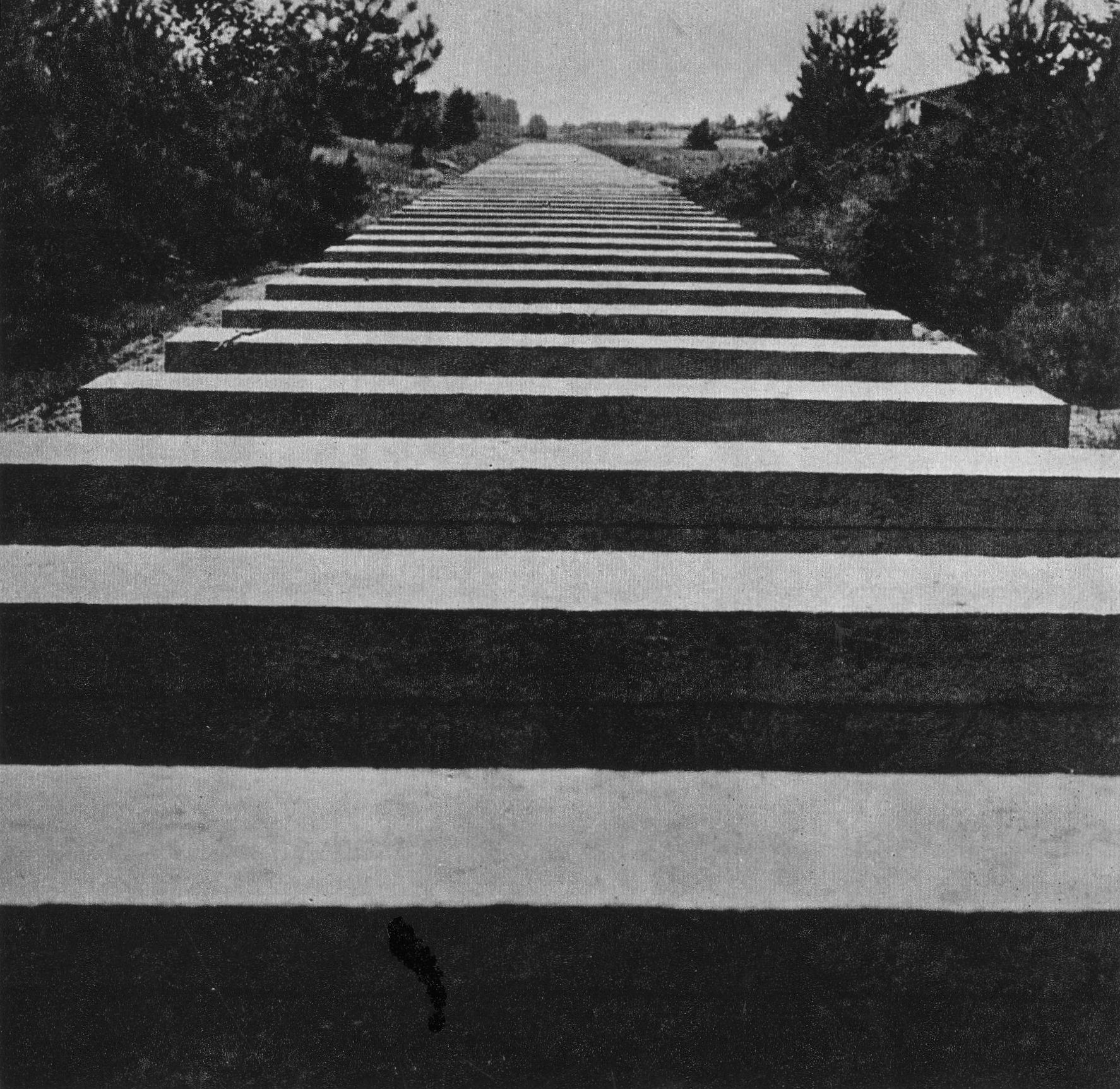
Construction of the memorial, featuring the symbolic railway track, early 1960s

Treblinka II was one of three extermination camps established by Nazi Germany as part of Operation Reinhard. Operating from July 1942, it was used for the genocide of Jewish populations. Historian Jacek A. Młynarczyk estimates at least 780,863 victims were killed there. On 2 August 1943, a prisoner uprising allowed approximately 400 inmates to escape. Shortly after, the Nazis began dismantling the camp to erase evidence of their crimes. By 17 November 1943, fences and remaining buildings were demolished, mass graves were exhumed and bodies incinerated, and the site was covered with lupins. A farm was established on the site, occupied by two Ukrainian guards and their families.

In August 1944, as the Red Army approached, the guards set fire to the farm and fled with their families. A year later, the only remnants of the farm were the remains of the utility building's foundations and the excavation where the cellar had been. The fence did not survive. It was dismantled – like the farm ruins – by local residents, who used the recovered materials to rebuild farms destroyed during the front's passage. Traces of the camp's railway ramp persisted until 1962.

In the early postwar years, the site remained unprotected and uncommemorated. Local Poles and Red Army soldiers, dubbed "grave hyenas", looted the area for valuables. In 1947, following pressure from Jewish organizations, Polish communist authorities took steps to secure and commemorate the site. On 2 July 1947, the Polish Parliament passed a resolution to memorialize Treblinka II and the nearby Treblinka I labor camp. A Committee for the Commemoration of Treblinka Victims, chaired by Warsaw Voivode Lucjusz Dura, was established. On 25 July 1947, the committee decided to hold a closed competition for a mausoleum design and launched a fundraising campaign. By September, the site was temporarily fenced, and a military unit was deployed for protection.

Eight artists were invited to the competition, but only four submitted designs. On 26 November, a jury including representatives from the Ministry of Culture and Art and the Jewish Central Historical Commission selected a design by landscape architect Alfons Zielonka and architect Władysław Niemiec. However, interest in the project waned, and the design was not implemented. (Note: Katarzyna Radecka attributes the non-realization of Zielonka and Niemiec’s design to its overly ambitious scope and concerns about the planned symbols. Additionally, Treblinka was not a priority for commemoration among authorities or Jewish organizations. See Radecka (2017, p. 256).) The committee ceased operations in 1948, likely in protest against government inaction. Jewish organizations also scaled back efforts. In 1949, the camp's boundaries were geodetically marked, fenced with barbed wire, and pathways were laid out. In 1953, the Ministry of Culture and regional authorities tasked the County National Councils in Węgrów and Sokołów Podlaski with site maintenance. Inspections in June 1954 revealed the fence had been destroyed, and treasure hunters continued to desecrate the site.

=== Construction ===
In 1955, the Central Board of Museums and Monuments of the Ministry of Culture and Art announced another closed competition for the site's development, inviting teams from academic centers in Warsaw, Kraków, and Gdańsk. The winning design was submitted by Gdańsk-based sculptor Franciszek Duszeńko and architect Adam Haupt.

The cornerstone was laid on 21 April 1958. In June 1958, the Presidium of the Warsaw Voivodeship National Council approved plans to restore and commemorate the site, tasking the culture department with forming a Social Committee for the Construction of the Treblinka Memorial. The Warsaw District Directorate for Workers' Housing Construction was appointed as the investor, and the Artistic and Research Workshops of the Academy of Fine Arts in Warsaw were commissioned to prepare technical documentation. Cleanup work occurred between 1958 and 1960. Design plans were finalized in October 1959. Discussions were held within the Inter-Organizational Committee of the Council for the Protection of Struggle and Martyrdom Sites and the Investment Project Evaluation Committee at the Warsaw District Directorate. The estimated cost was 15 million PLN.

Construction faced significant delays, primarily due to funding shortages. The project required expropriating 127 hectares owned by 192 individuals. Concerns were raised about design details, including the commemoration of the labor camp, preservation of camp infrastructure, and naming specific victims. Katarzyna Radecka suggests that rising antisemitism following the Polish October may have contributed to delays. Cleanup efforts were hindered by workers and even Milicja Obywatelska guards collaborating with looters.

In the early 1960s, events such as the Adolf Eichmann trial and attempts in West Germany to declare Nazi crimes time-barred created a political climate conducive to advancing the project. In November 1960, the Warsaw Voivodeship Presidium approved the preliminary design. In 1961, the final decision was made to erect the memorial, with construction assigned to the Artistic and Research Workshops at the Warsaw Academy of Fine Arts. Franciszek Strynkiewicz joined Haupt and Duszeńko, contributing the execution wall at the former Treblinka I labor camp. A fundraising committee, led by University of Warsaw rector Stanisław Turski, raised 12,873,000 PLN domestically and internationally, including through Polish diplomatic missions. Initial ceremonies at the unfinished memorial took place in April 1963. Construction was completed in late 1963, with technical inspections from 28 October to 29 November and artistic approval on 2 December. The total cost reached 17 million PLN.

The memorial was officially unveiled on 10 May 1964 by Deputy Speaker of the Sejm Zenon Kliszko. The ceremony drew 30,000 attendees from Poland and abroad, including survivors, World Jewish Congress president Nahum Goldmann, and representatives of Jewish organizations.

The memorial complex became part of the Treblinka Mausoleum of Struggle and Martyrdom. In 1986, it was incorporated as a branch of the Siedlce Regional Museum, renamed the Museum of Struggle and Martyrdom in Treblinka. In 2018, it became an independent cultural institution named "Treblinka Museum. German Nazi Extermination and Labor Camp (1941–1944)".

== Appearance ==
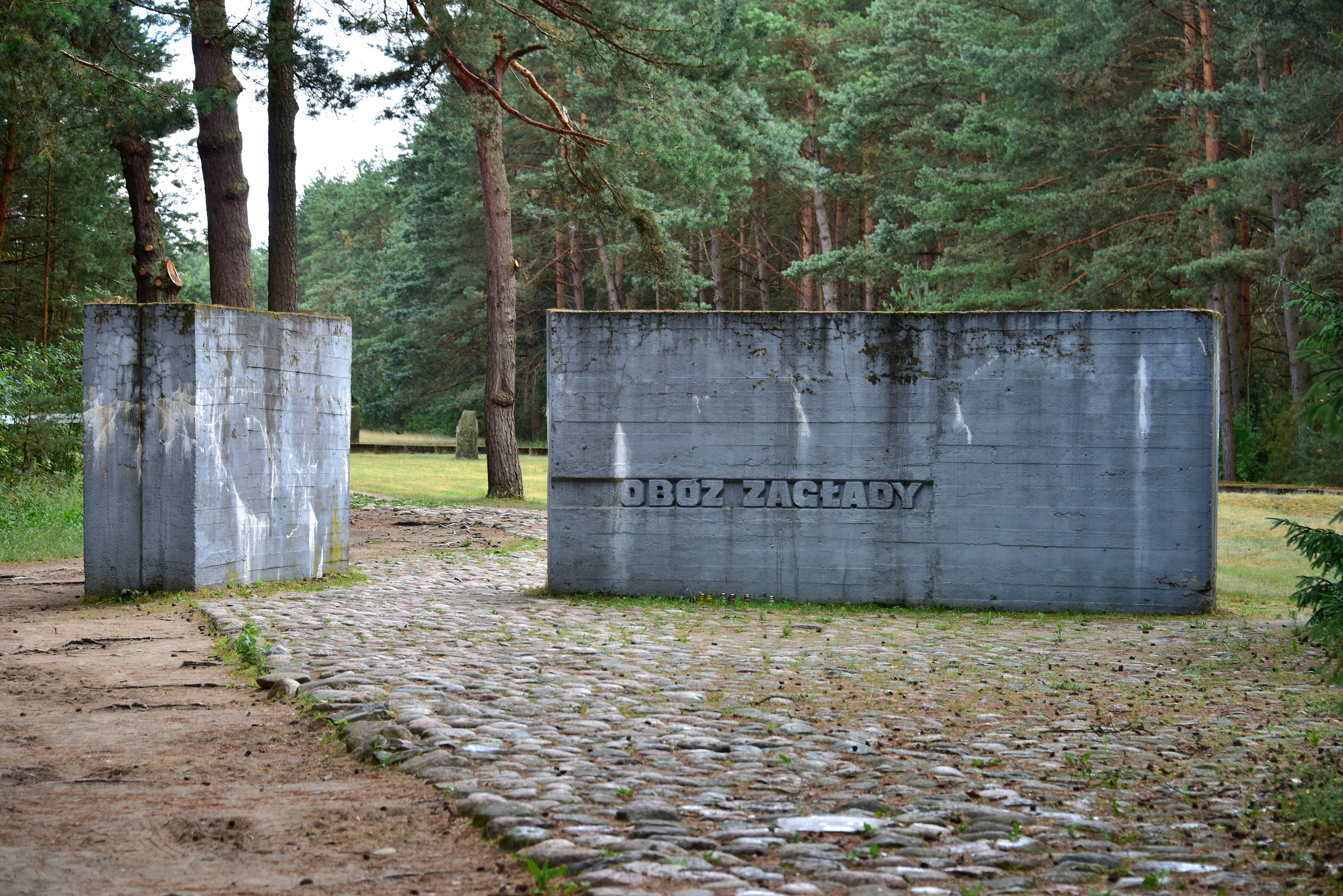
Symbolic gate

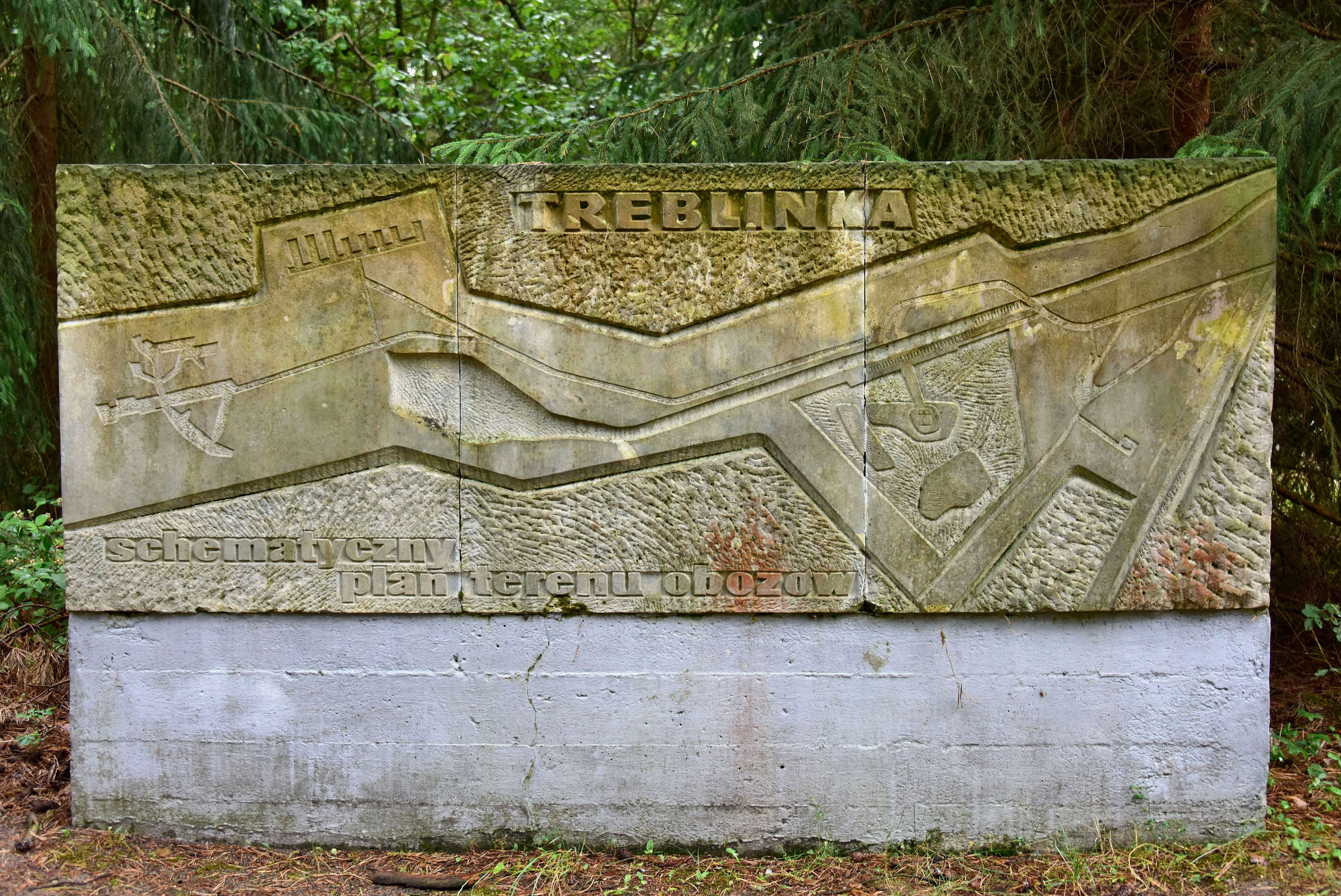
Stone plaque with a map of Treblinka I and II camps

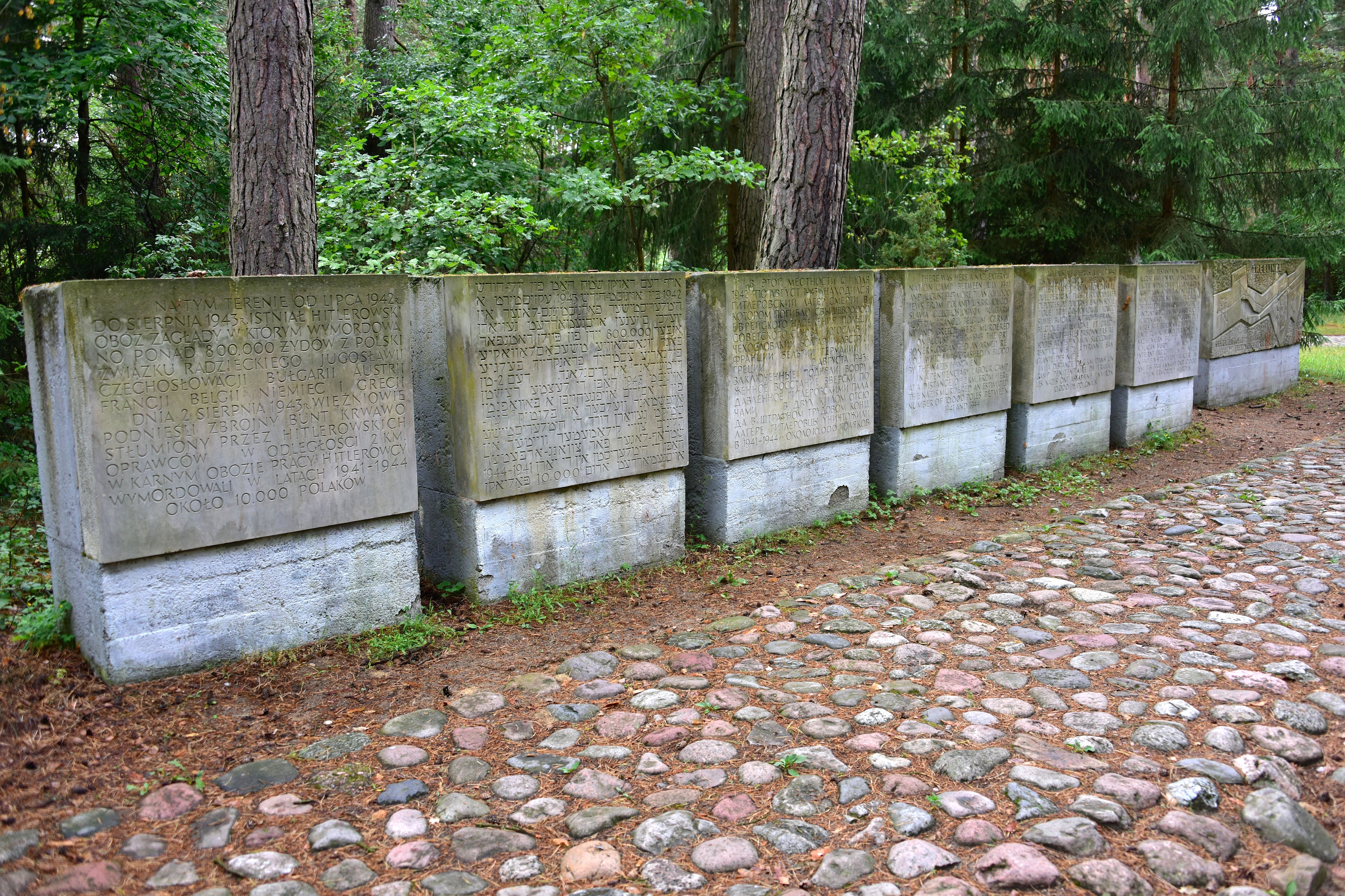
Stone plaques with the camp's history in various languages

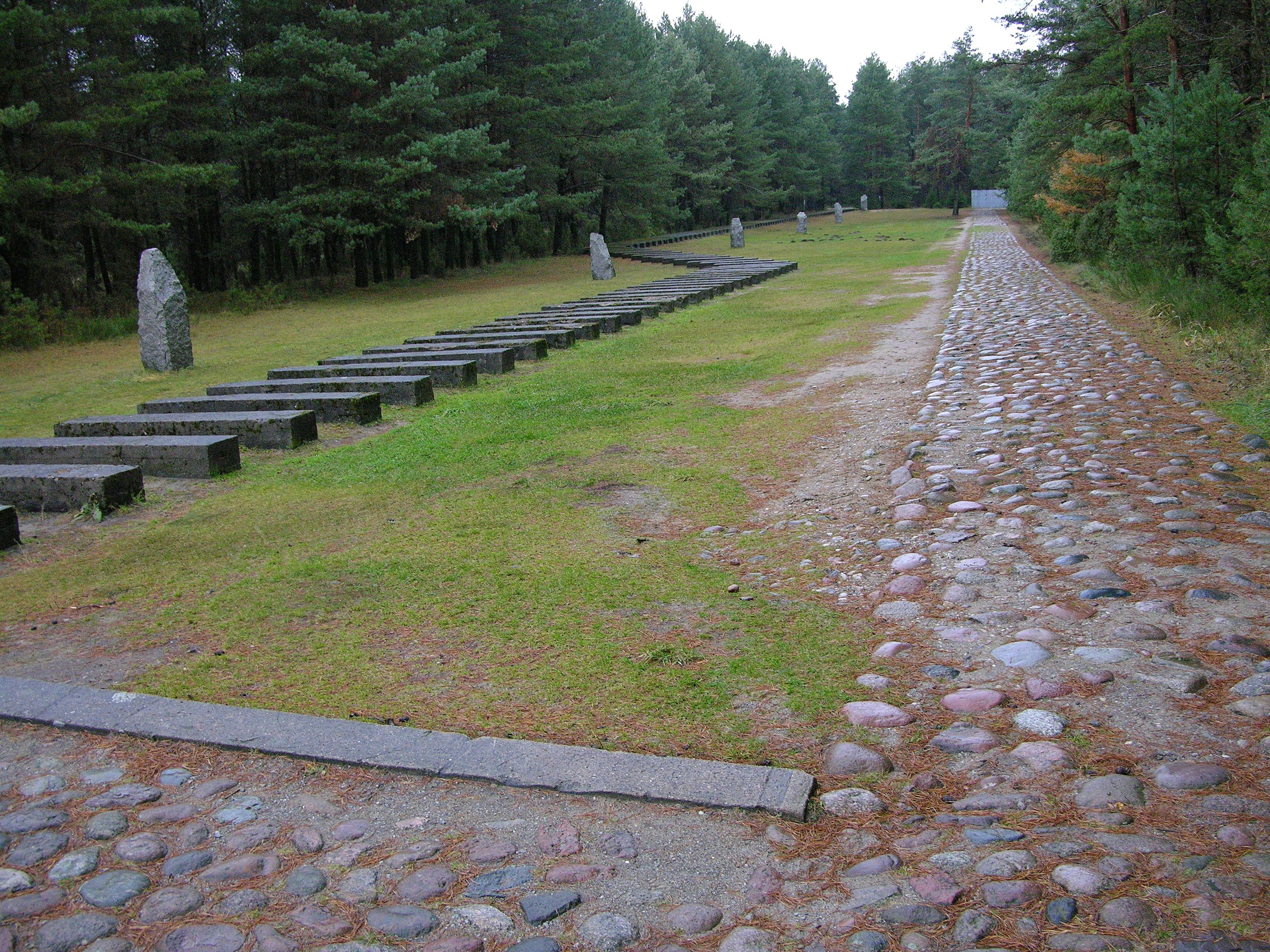
Cobblestone path from the gate to the symbolic ramp, with a symbolic railway track on the left

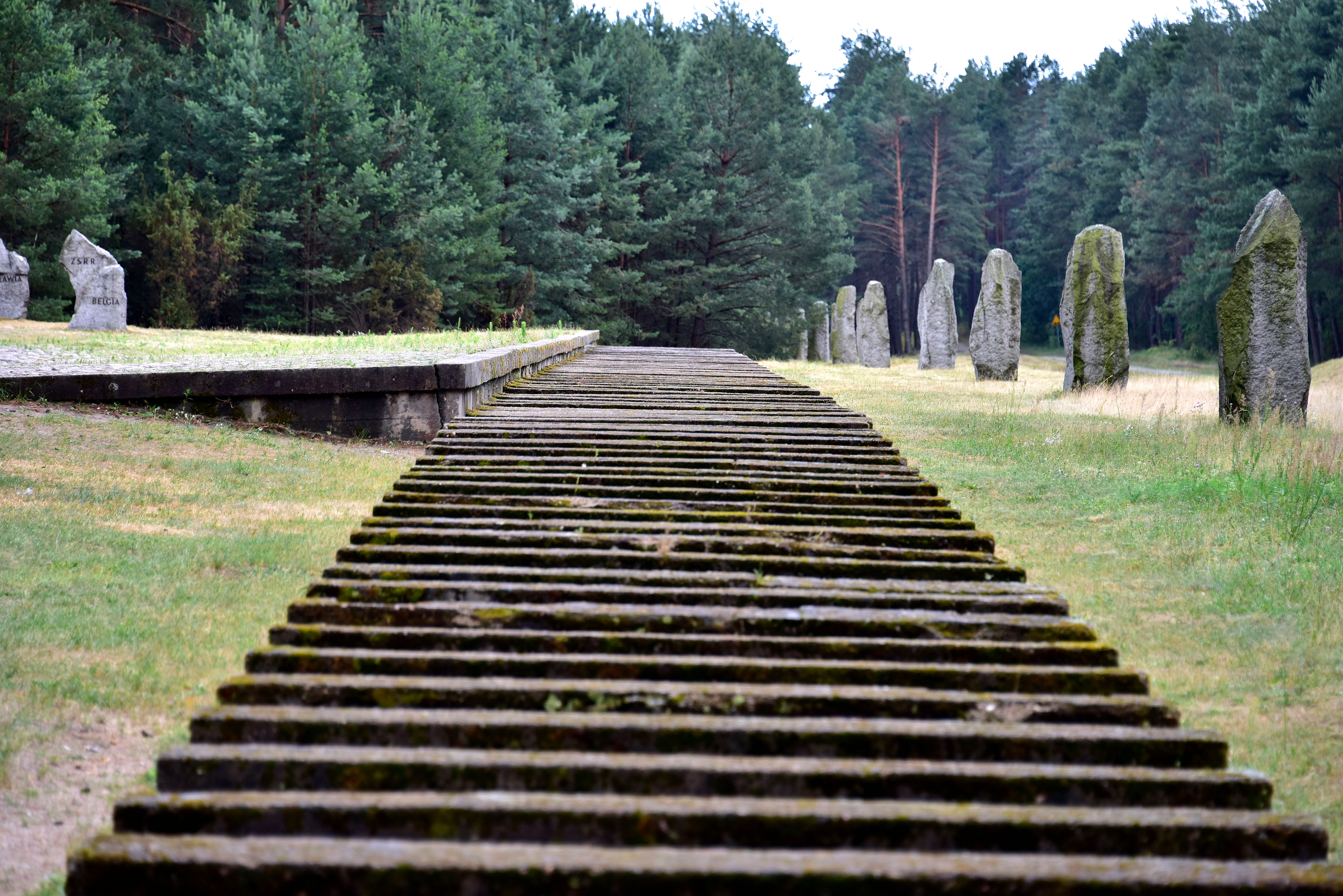
Symbolic railway track, with the ramp on the left and boundary pillars on the right

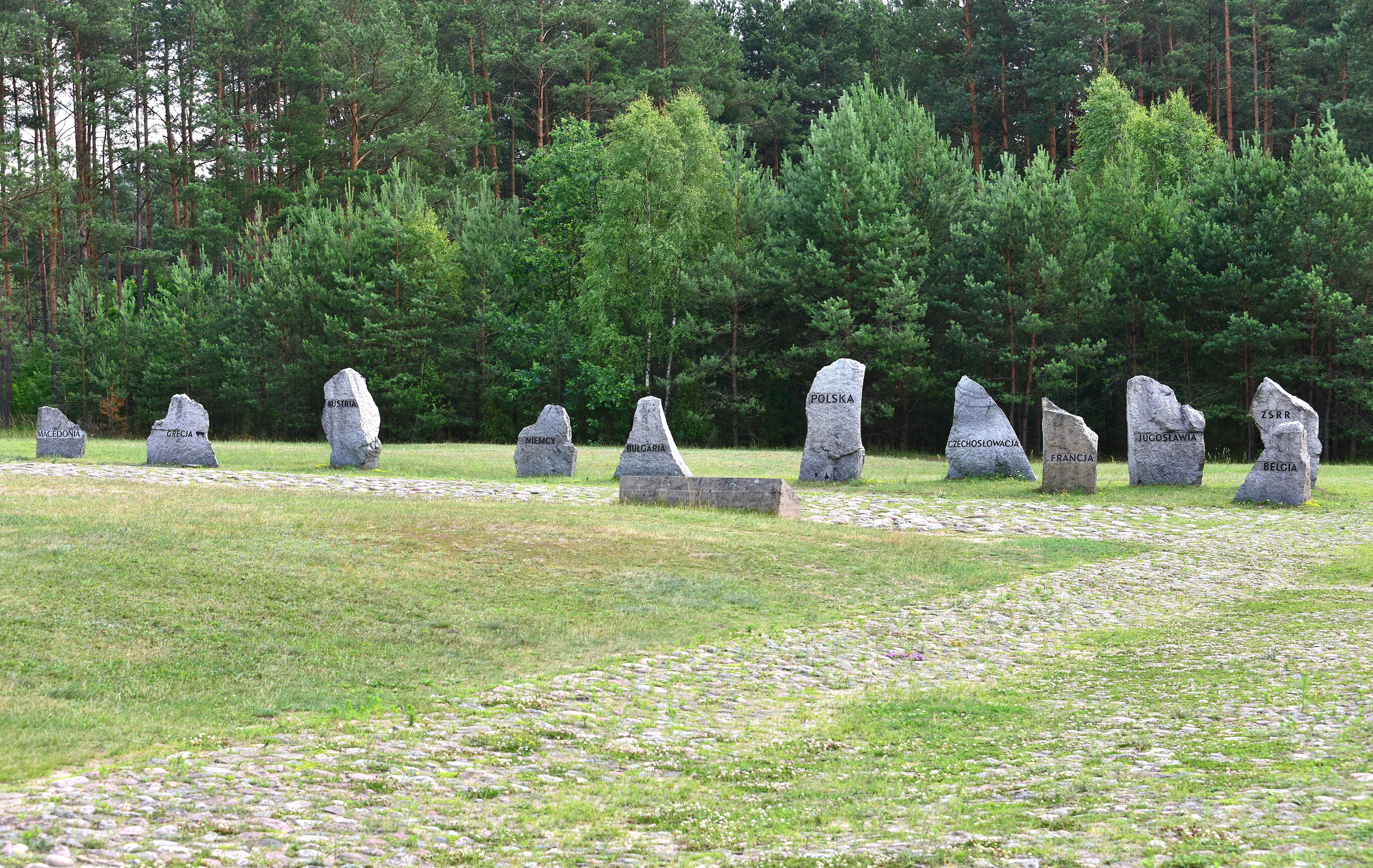
Cobblestone path from the ramp to the central memorial area with stones inscribed with country names

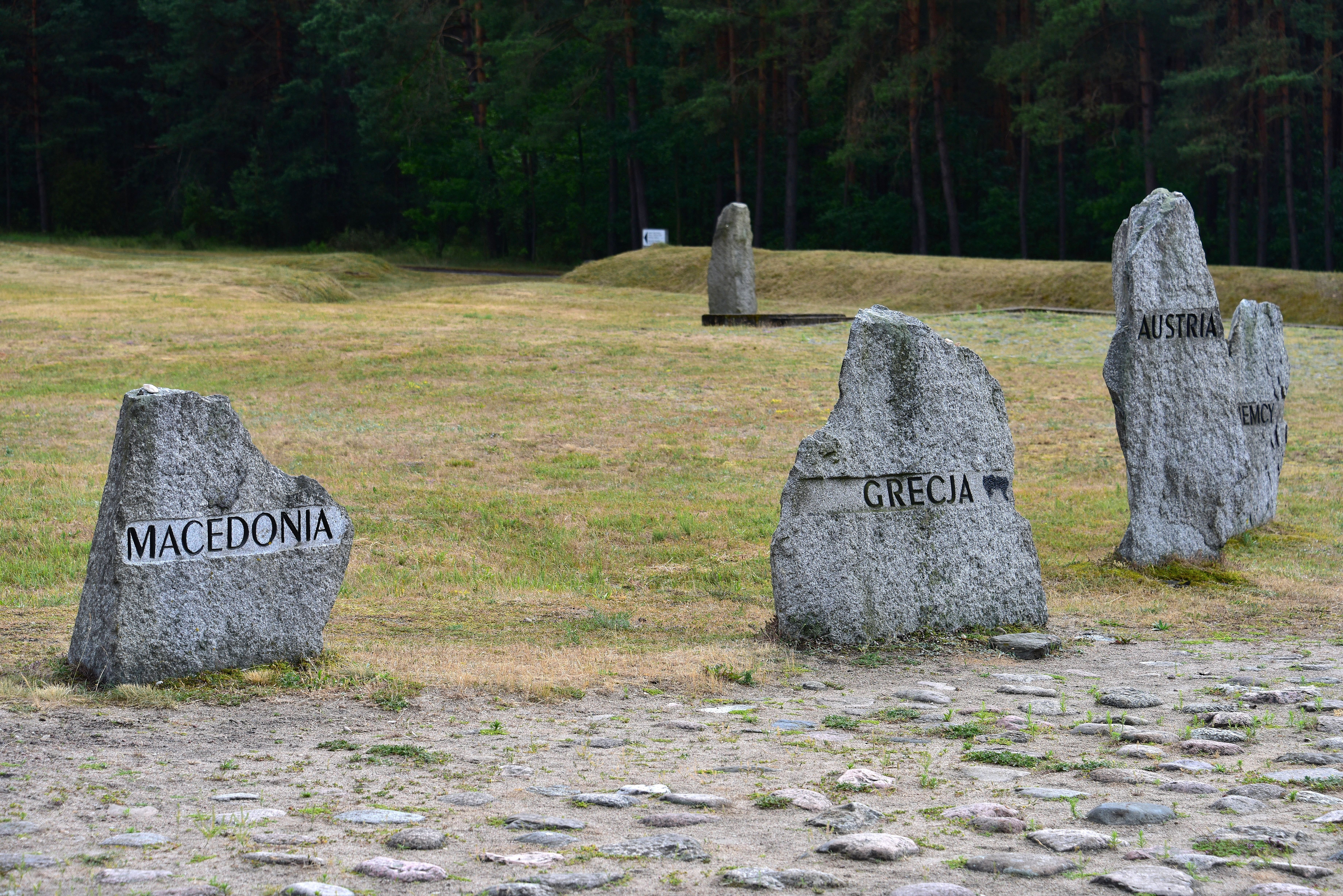
Stones inscribed with country names

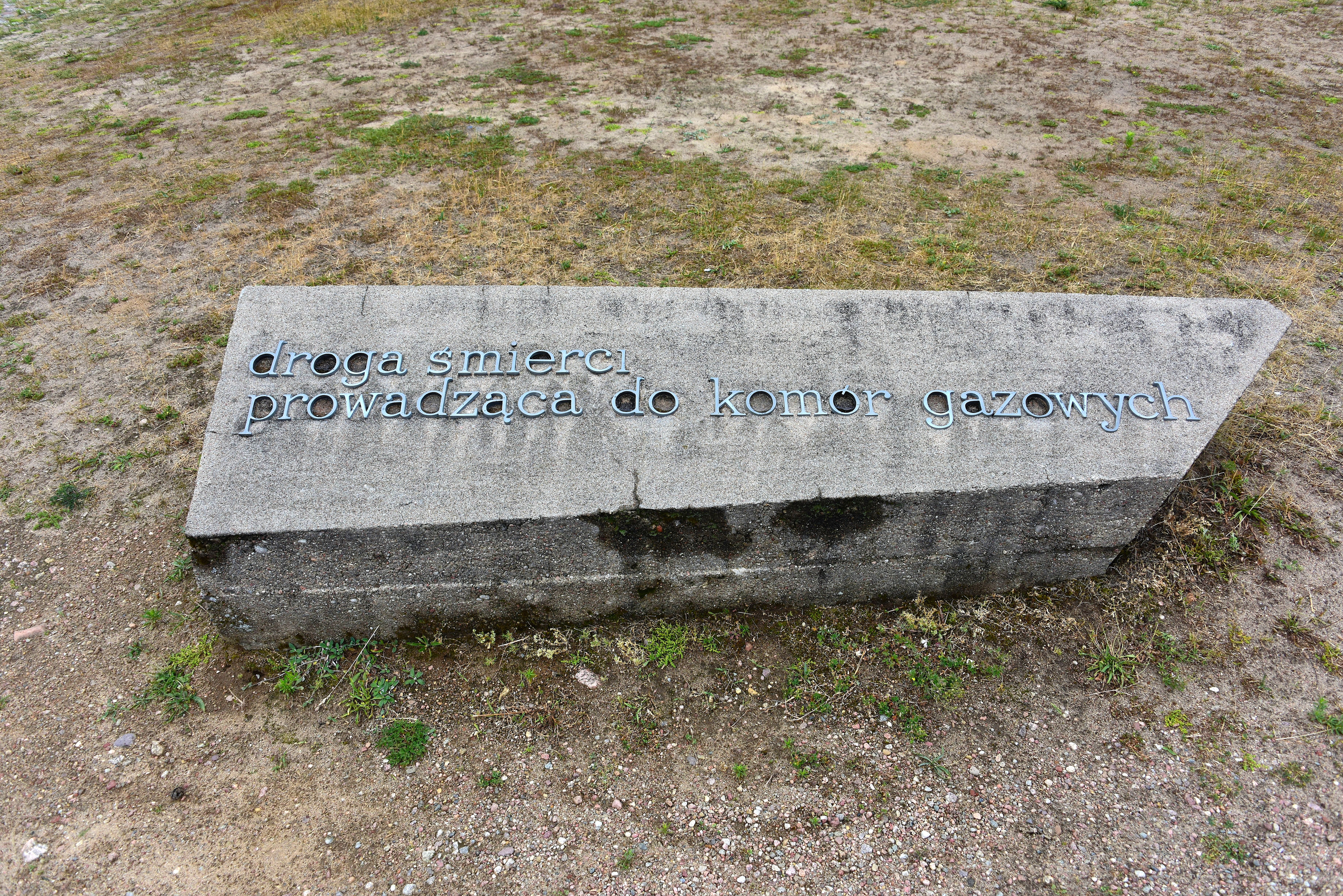
Marker along the path to the former gas chambers

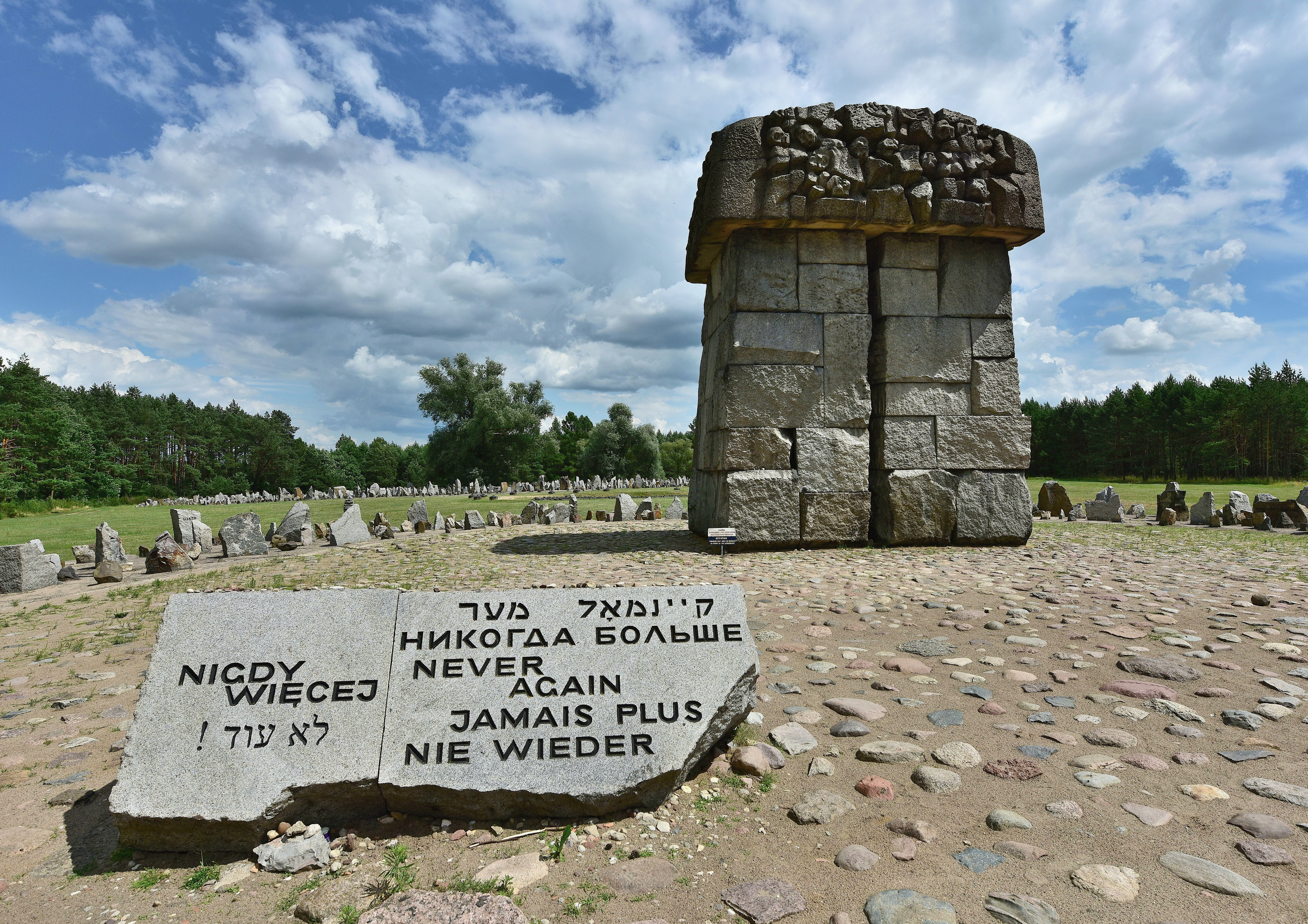
Front view of the monument, with a plaque reading "Never Again" in seven languages

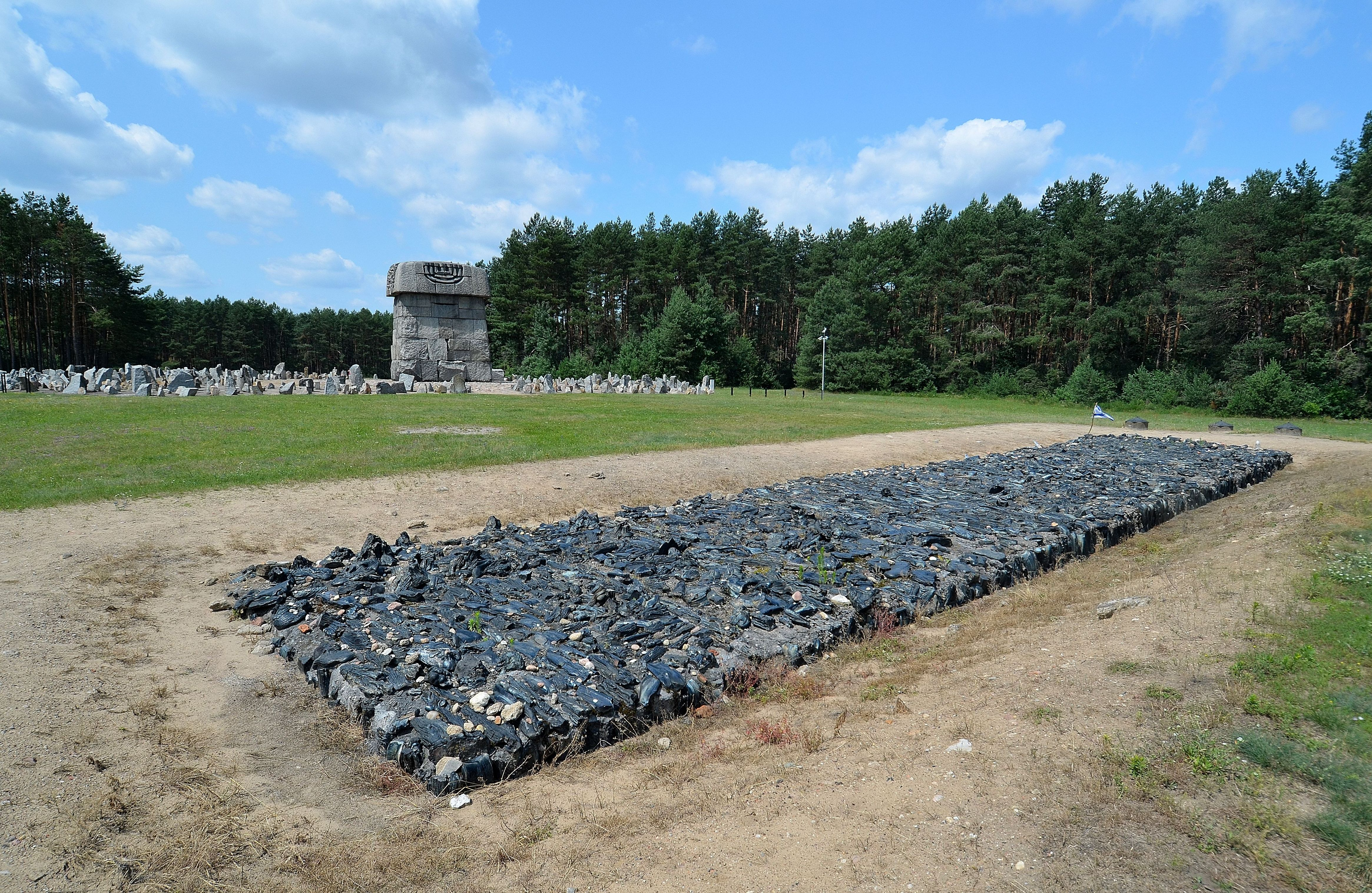
Plate symbolizing the cremation pit

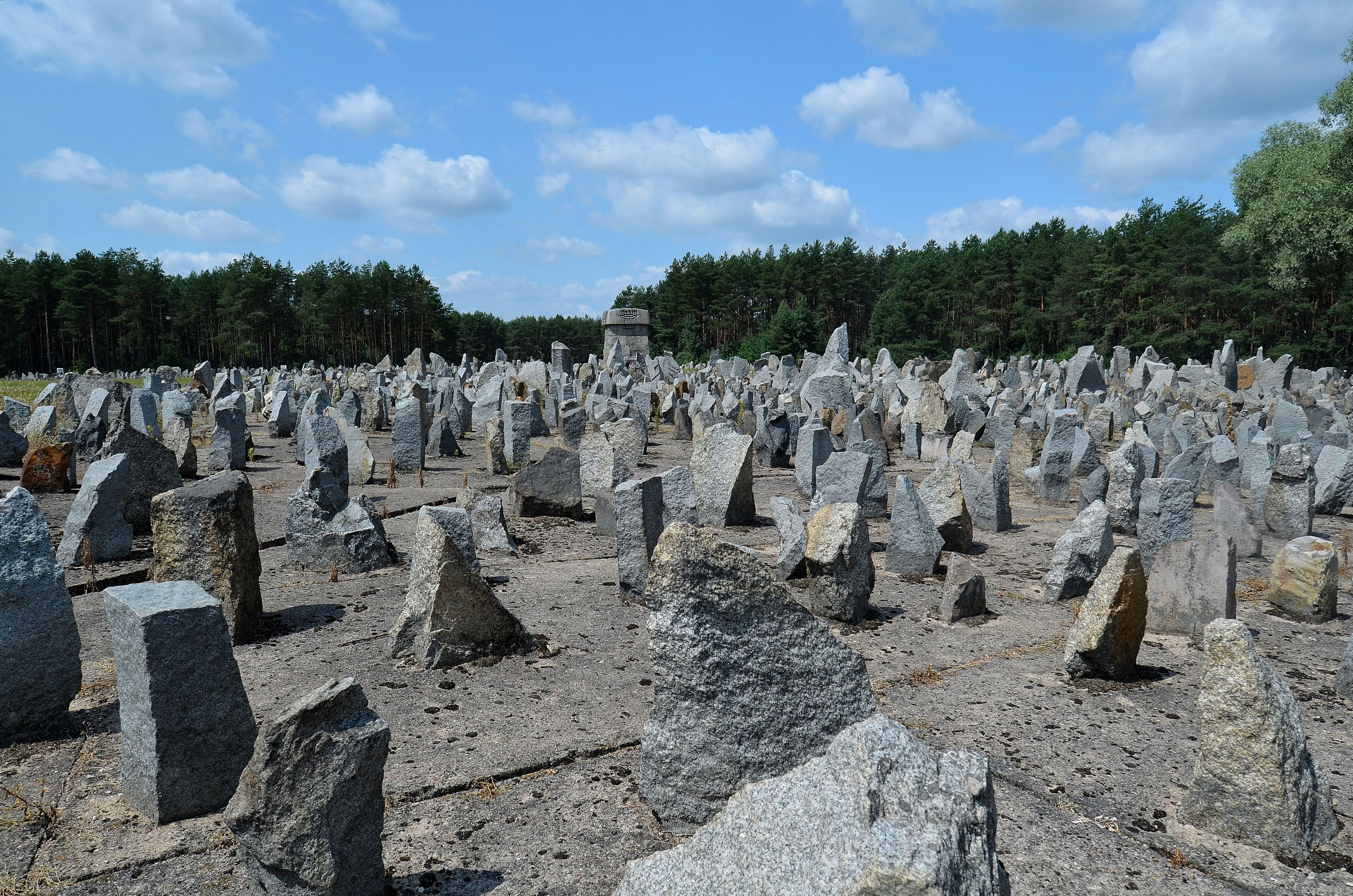
Memorial stones

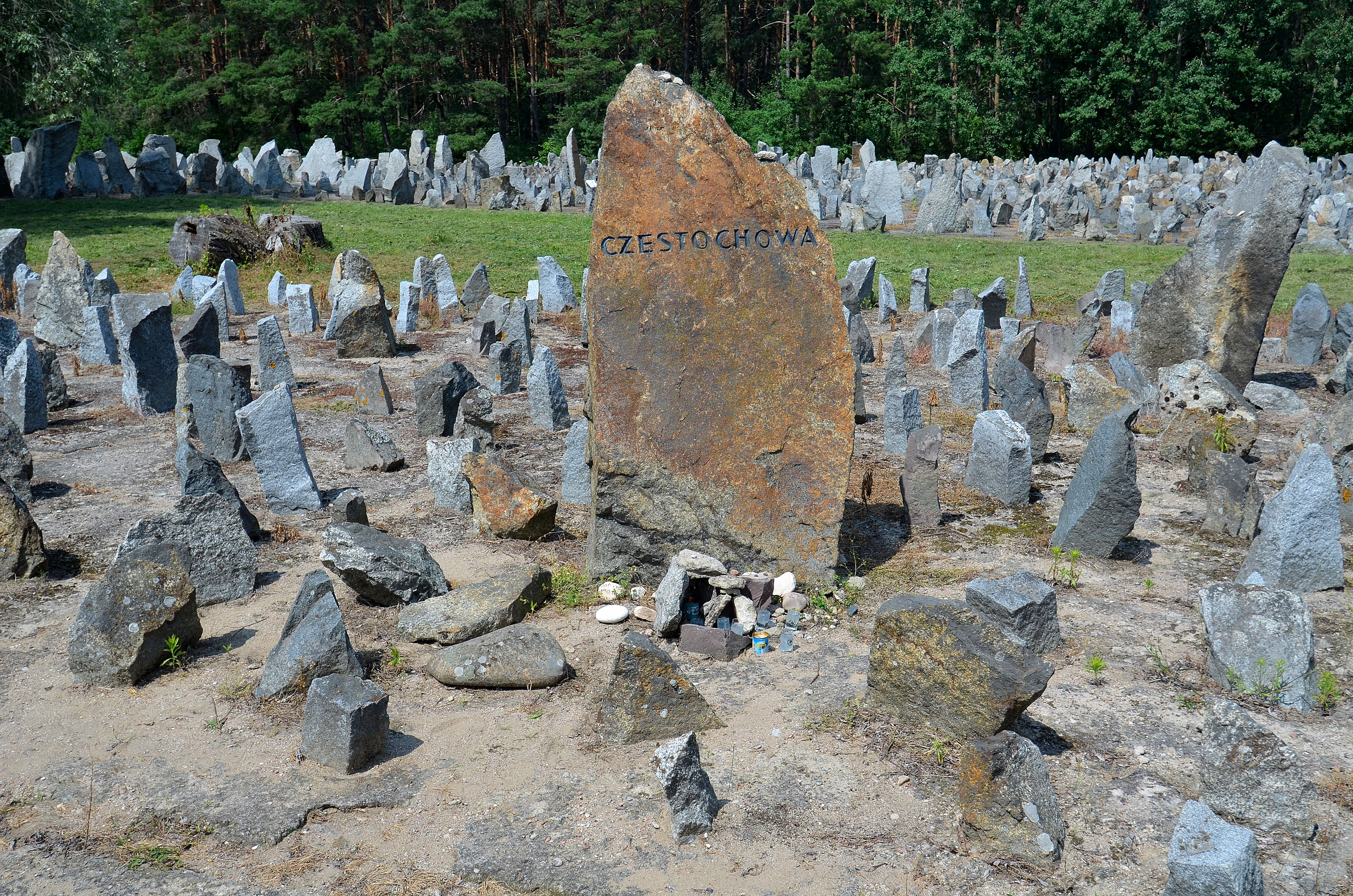
Stone commemorating victims from Częstochowa

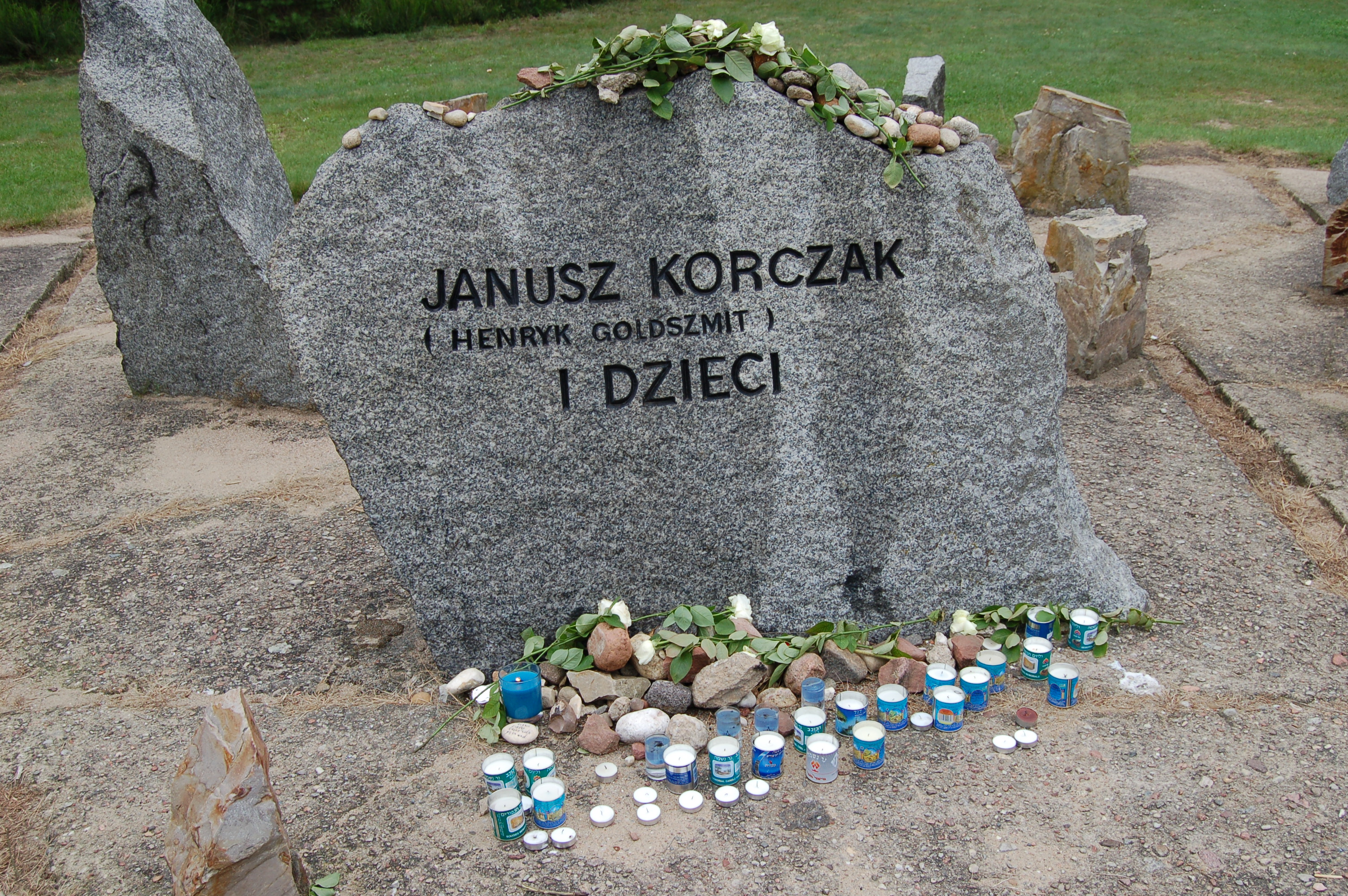
Stone commemorating Janusz Korczak and children from the Warsaw Orphanage

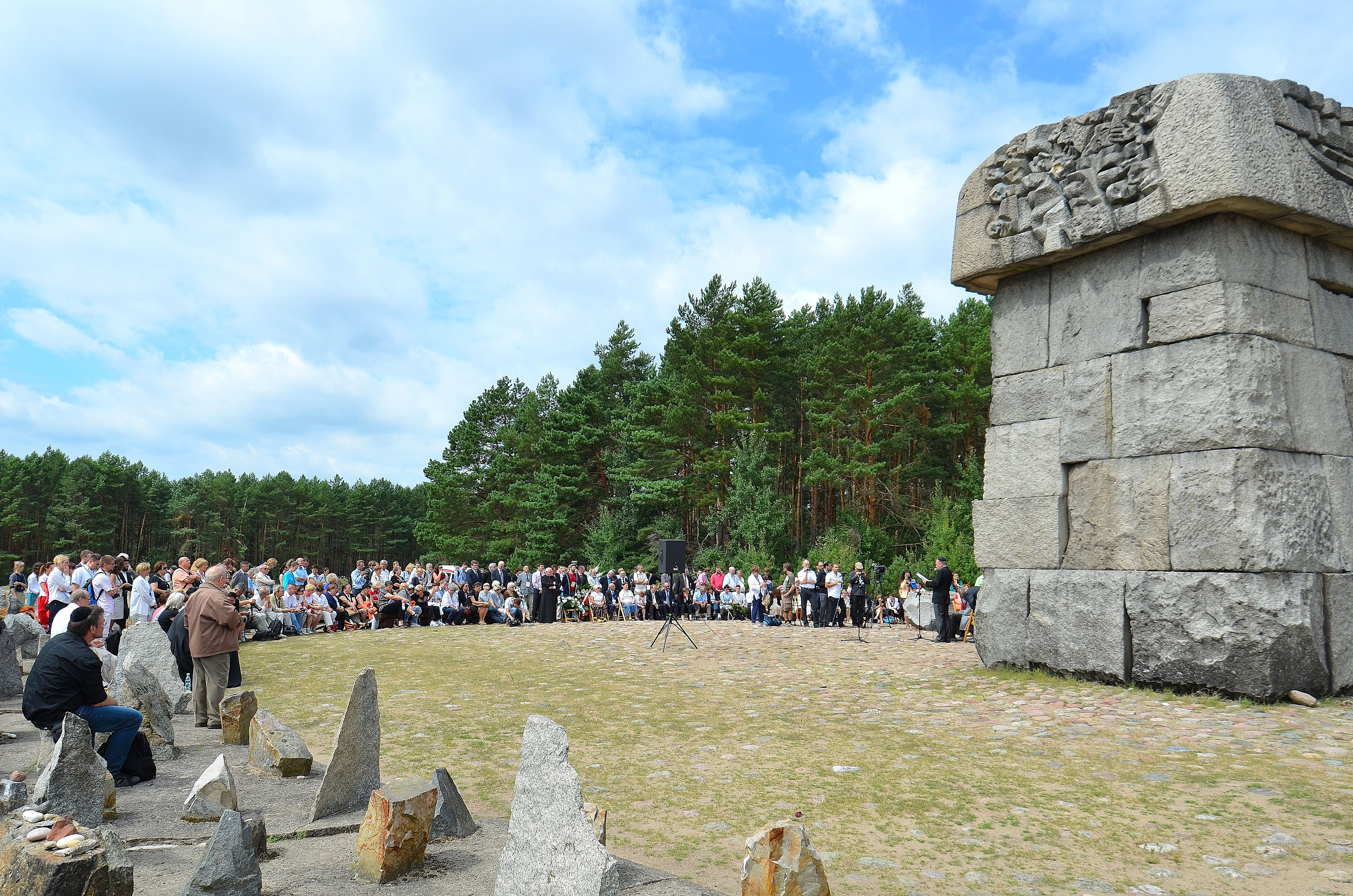
Ceremony marking the 70th anniversary of the Treblinka uprising, showing the monument's side with reliefs of human figures

The boundaries of Treblinka II are marked by jagged granite pillars, approximately two meters tall. The symbolic camp gate consists of two concrete blocks inscribed with "Extermination Camp". Seven stone plaques stand before the gate: six briefly describe the camp's history (Note: “From July 1942 to August 1943, a Nazi extermination camp operated here, where over 800,000 Jews from Poland, the Soviet Union, Yugoslavia, Czechoslovakia, Bulgaria, Austria, France, Belgium, Germany, and Greece were murdered. On 2 August 1943, prisoners staged an armed revolt, brutally suppressed by Nazi oppressors. Two kilometers away, at the Treblinka I labor camp, Nazis murdered approximately 10,000 Poles between 1941 and 1944.” See Kopówka & Rytel-Andrianik (2011, p. 119).) in English, French, German, Polish, Russian, and Yiddish, while the seventh displays a map of Treblinka I and II.

A cobblestone path, symbolizing Jewish shtetls destroyed in the Holocaust, leads from the gate to a symbolic railway ramp. Concrete sleepers along the path represent the railway track. At the ramp, stones are inscribed with the names of countries from which Jews were deported to Treblinka, initially including Austria, Belgium, Bulgaria, Czechoslovakia, France, Greece, Yugoslavia, Germany, Poland, and the Soviet Union. (Note: In reality, no transports were sent to Treblinka from Belgium, France, Bulgaria, or the Soviet Union within its prewar borders.) In 2008, a stone for Macedonia was added.

Another cobblestone path leads from the ramp to a forest clearing where the central monument stands, replicating the route victims took to the gas chambers. Stones mark the locations of former undressing barracks.

The central monument, designed by Franciszek Duszeńko, stands where the "new" gas chambers were located. Rising eight meters, it is constructed from unhewn granite blocks, evoking Jerusalem's Western Wall. A vertical fissure runs through its front (western) face, resembling a crack. The monument is capped with a structure featuring reliefs on three sides – front and both laterals – depicting human figures with pained expressions, titled Martyrdom, Women and Children, Struggle, and Survival, symbolizing the human tragedies that took place in the camp. The cap's front face features hands raised in a blessing gesture, while the rear (eastern) face depicts a menorah. A stone plaque in front bears the inscription "Never Again" in English, French, Hebrew, (Note: The Hebrew inscription was added in 2002 at the initiative of Israel’s ambassador to Poland, Szewach Weiss. See Zawadka (2015, p. 43).) German, Polish, Russian, and Yiddish. (Note: Initially, excerpts from Władysław Broniewski’s poem To Polish Jews or Mieczysław Jastrun’s Funeral were considered for the plaque. The phrase “Never Again” was chosen for its universal message, possibly to avoid emphasizing the victims’ Jewish identity. See Radecka (2017, pp. 259–260).)

Behind the monument, a 22-meter-long, 4.5-meter-wide concrete plate, slightly sunken into the ground, represents the cremation pit where victims' bodies were burned. Blackened with English soot and covered with basalt "icicles" from a Starachowice factory, it evokes charred remains and broken bones. 18 liquid-fuel lamps, when lit, simulate a burning pyre, making it one of the memorial's most emotive elements.

The surrounding area, covering approximately 22,000 m², is divided into three fields covered with concrete that conforms to the terrain's natural contours, protecting mass grave remnants from looters. About 17,000 jagged, unhewn stones of varying sizes are scattered across these fields, possibly symbolizing the maximum number of victims killed daily in the gas chambers. The stones may represent a "procession to nowhere", matzevot, or the Jewish tradition of placing pebbles on graves. Both the stones and monument are made of grey granite from Strzegom. (Note: Plans to use beige-pink granite from Finland or Swedish labradorite were abandoned due to high costs. See Rusiniak (2008, p. 48).)

Some stones bear the names of localities from which at least 1,000 Jews were deported to Treblinka. Initially, 130 localities were commemorated. In 1998, 86 more were added, mainly from the former Bialystok District now outside Poland's borders. A 2019 brochure, Plan kamieni symbolicznych, published by the Treblinka Museum, lists 222 commemorated localities: (Note: Locality names are listed with their original spelling.)

- Adamów
- Augustów
- Baranów Sandomierski
- Biała Podlaska
- Biała Rawska
- Białobrzegi
- Białystok
- Bielsk Podlaski
- Bliżyn
- Błędów
- Błonie
- Bodzanów
- Bodzentyn
- Brańsk
- Brok
- Busko-Zdrój
- Celestynów (Note: Commemorated in 1999 at the request of its residents. See Kopówka & Rytel-Andrianik (2011, p. 121).)
- Chęciny
- Chmielnik
- Choroszcz
- Ciechanowiec
- Ciepielów
- Częstochowa
- Ćmielów
- Dąbrowa Białostocka
- Dęblin (Note: Commemorated in 2010. See Kopówka & Rytel-Andrianik (2011, p. 121).)
- Dobre
- Druskininkai
- Drzewica
- Falenica
- Garbatka-Letnisko
- Garwolin
- Głowaczów
- Głowno
- Gniewoszów
- Golędziszów (Note: It is unclear which locality by this name is commemorated.)
- Goniądz
- Gorzkowice
- Góra Kalwaria
- Grajewo
- Grodno
- Grodzisk Mazowiecki
- Gródek
- Grójec
- Iłża
- Indura
- Iwaniska
- Jadów
- Jałówka
- Janów
- Janów Podlaski
- Jasionówka
- Jedlińsk
- Jedwabne
- Jeziory
- Jeżów
- Jędrzejów
- Kałuszyn
- Kamieńsk
- Karczew
- Kielce
- Kiełbasin
- Kleszczele
- Klimontów
- Knyszyn
- Kock
- Koluszki
- Kołbiel
- Koniecpol
- Konstantynów
- Końskie
- Koprzywnica
- Korycin
- Kosów Lacki
- Kozienice
- Krynki
- Kuflew
- Kunów
- Kuźnica
- Latowicz
- Legionowo
- Lipsko nad Wisłą
- Ludwisin (Note: Now part of Legionowo.)
- Łagów
- Łapy
- Łaskarzew
- Łochów
- Łomża
- Łosice
- Łowicz
- Łuków
- Lunna
- Lyskov
- Magnuszew
- Maków Mazowiecki
- Małkinia Górna
- Małogoszcz
- Marianów (Note: It is unclear which locality by this name is commemorated.)
- Mariampol
- Michałowo
- Międzyrzec Podlaski
- Milejczyce
- Mińsk Mazowiecki
- Mława
- Mniszew
- Mogielnica
- Mordy
- Masty
- Mrozy
- Mszczonów
- Narew
- Nasielsk
- Nowe Miasto nad Pilicą
- Nowy Korczyn
- Oblas
- Odelsk
- Opatów
- Opoczno
- Orla
- Osiek
- Ostrowiec Świętokrzyski
- Ostrów Mazowiecka
- Astryna
- Otwock
- Ożarów
- Pacanów
- Parysów
- Piaseczno
- Pionki
- Piotrków Trybunalski
- Pińczów
- Płock
- Policzna
- Porozów
- Porzecze
- Pruszków
- Prużana
- Przedbórz
- Przemyśl
- Przygłów
- Przysucha
- Przytyk
- Pułtusk
- Raciąż
- Radom
- Radomsko
- Radoszyce
- Radziłów
- Radzymin
- Rajgród
- Rawa Mazowiecka
- Rembertów
- Ros
- Ruzhany
- Sandomierz
- Sarnaki (Note: Commemorated in 2010. See Kopówka & Rytel-Andrianik (2011, p. 121).)
- Sarnów
- Serokomla
- Sędziszów
- Sidra
- Sieciechów
- Siedlce
- Siemiatycze
- Siennica
- Sienno
- Skaryszew
- Skarżysko-Kamienna
- Skidel
- Skierniewice
- Sławatycze
- Nowa Słupia
- Sobienie-Jeziory
- Sobolew
- Sochaczew
- Sokołów Podlaski
- Sokoły
- Sokółka
- Solec nad Wisłą
- Stanisławów
- Starachowice
- Staszów
- Sterdyń
- Stoczek
- Stoczek Łukowski
- Stopnica
- Stromiec
- Suchedniów
- Suchowola
- Sulejów
- Szczekociny
- Szydłowiec
- Śniadowo
- Svislach
- Tarczyn
- Tarłów
- Terespol
- Tłuszcz
- Tomaszów Mazowiecki
- Trzcianne
- Ujazd
- Warka
- Warszawa
- Wasilków
- Wawer
- Węgrów
- Wierzbnik
- Wiskitki
- Wisznice
- Włoszczowa
- Wodzisław
- Wolanów
- Wołkowysk
- Wołomin
- Wołpa
- Wyszków
- Wyszogród
- Zabłudów
- Zawichost
- Zwoleń
- Żarki
- Żarnów
- Żelechów

In 1978, a stone was dedicated to Janusz Korczak and his wards from the Warsaw Orphanage, the only named commemoration at the site. Another stone, inscribed "To the Martyrs of the Warsaw Ghetto", deviates from the standard convention.

Marek Kucia notes that the Treblinka memorial was likely the only monument in the Eastern Bloc at the time to explicitly highlight the Jewish identity of the victims. In 1964, the memorial's creators received the State Artistic Award for visual arts. The memorial is described as an outstanding and innovative work, "an exceptional piece of monumental architecture and the most moving architectural-sculptural composition dedicated to Holocaust victims in Poland", and "a masterpiece unmatched in spatial art". In 1994, New York's The Jewish Museum named it the most moving Holocaust memorial worldwide. James E. Young calls it "the most outstanding of all Holocaust memorials", while Halina Taborska ranks it as Poland's finest and among the world's greatest Holocaust commemorations. Marek Kucia views it as a model for Holocaust remembrance. Frank van Vree considers it among the "most shattering places of memory", outshining contemporary memorials and remaining a reference point for others, including during debates over Berlin's Memorial to the Murdered Jews of Europe.

Since 1964, annual ceremonies honoring the victims have been held at the memorial, initially in late April or early May, coinciding with the Warsaw Ghetto Uprising anniversary. They now occur on 2 August, marking the Treblinka uprising.

== Bibliography ==
- Radecka, Katarzyna (2017). "Założenie pomnikowe w Treblince" [The Memorial Complex in Treblinka]. In Kranz, Tomasz (ed.). Muzea w poobozowych miejscach pamięci: tożsamość, znaczenia, funkcje [Museums at Former Camp Sites: Identity, Meanings, Functions] (in Polish). Lublin: Państwowe Muzeum na Majdanku. ISBN 978-83-62816-36-1.
- Rusiniak, Martyna (2008). Obóz zagłady Treblinka II w pamięci społecznej (1943–1989) [Treblinka II Extermination Camp in Social Memory (1943–1989)] (in Polish). Warsaw: Neriton. ISBN 978-83-7543-020-2.
- Zawadka, Artur (2015). "Upamiętnianie Treblinki" [Commemorating Treblinka]. In Kopówka, Edward (ed.). Treblinka: historia i pamięć [Treblinka: History and Memory] (in Polish). Siedlce: Muzeum Regionalne w Siedlcach. ISBN 978-83-88761-51-5.
