= Franciszek Duszeńko =

Polish sculptor

- Franciszek Duszeńko in Gdańsk
- Born: 6 April 1925
- Died: 11 April 2008 (aged 83)
- Known for: Sculpture
- Notable work: Memorials at Treblinka and at Westerplatte
- Movement: Monumental art
- Elected: Rector of Academy of Fine Arts in Gdańsk

Franciszek Duszeńko (6 April 1925 – 11 April 2008) was a Polish sculptor, professor of the Academy of Fine Arts in Gdańsk and its Rector in the years 1981–87. He was a former prisoner of Nazi concentration camps in World War II.

During the occupation of Poland Duszeńko was the soldier of Armia Krajowa (the Home Army) in the service of Gródek Jagielloński Inspectorate of Communication in the Lwów district (now Lviv, Ukraine). Arrested in Lwów, he became prisoner of two Nazi concentration camps including Gross-Rosen and Sachsenhausen-Oranienburg. He survived, and later devoted his artistic output to the remembrance of those who had perished.

== Life and work ==
Duszeńko was born at Gródek Jagielloński (now Horodok, Ukraine) in the Second Polish Republic eastern region of Kresy. He witnessed the ethnic cleansing accompanying the 1939 Soviet invasion of Poland, and the subsequent Operation Barbarossa by Nazi Germany in 1941. He worked in the Underground but at the same time began to study art in Lwów at the already renamed Kunstgewerbeschule (Arts Institute) in 1942 under Professor Marian Wnuk. He was arrested in 1944 and shipped to concentration camps. Following World War II and the annexation of eastern Poland by the Soviet Union Duszeńko relocated to Gdańsk where he obtained a fine arts diploma in 1952 and began to teach at his alma mater in the same year. He became Dean at the Faculty of Sculpture in 1960–64. During the Solidarity years Duszeńko was appointed Rector of the Academy of Fine Arts in Gdańsk in 1981, in office until 1987. He served as Head of Sculpture and Drawing Department in 1987–96. After his tenure, at the request of the authorities of the Gdańsk Academy, he continued to guide graduating students in their creative work leading toward the final diploma, until 2001.

Duszeńko is the author of several iconic World War II monuments in Poland including the 8 metres (26 ft) tall Memorial to Victims of the Treblinka extermination camp designed with architect Adam Haupt, and unveiled on site by the Marshal of the Sejm of the Republic of Poland in the presence of 30,000 guests who attended the ceremony in 1964 including Jewish survivors from Israel, France, Czechoslovakia and Poland. More than 800,000 Jews were murdered in the gas chambers of Treblinka during the Holocaust in Poland. The sculpture represents the trend toward large avant-garde forms introduced in the 1960s throughout Europe, with a granite tower cracked down the middle and capped by a mushroom-like block carved with abstract reliefs and Jewish symbols. He is also the author of the Westerplatte Monument in Gdańsk (with architects Adam Haupt and Henryk Kitowski) built in 1964–66, as well as the "Polish Gunners" in Toruń and notable others.

His surviving wife, Urszula Ruhnke-Duszeńko, (1922-2014) was a painter and academic employed in 1952–71 at the Gdańsk Academy, initially at the painting atelier of Prof. Juliusz Studnicki, and then as Head of the Painting Studio at the Faculty of Interior Design. His son, Marcin Duszeńko (1958–2000) was also an artist and an adjunct at the Faculty of Painting. A big retrospective of Franciszek Duszeńko's work was organized in January 2013 at the Günter Grass Gallery in Gdańsk. Duszeńko was posthumously awarded the Medal of the City of Gdańsk in 2008. He died only months earlier, and was buried at the Srebrzysko Cemetery locally.

== Gallery ==
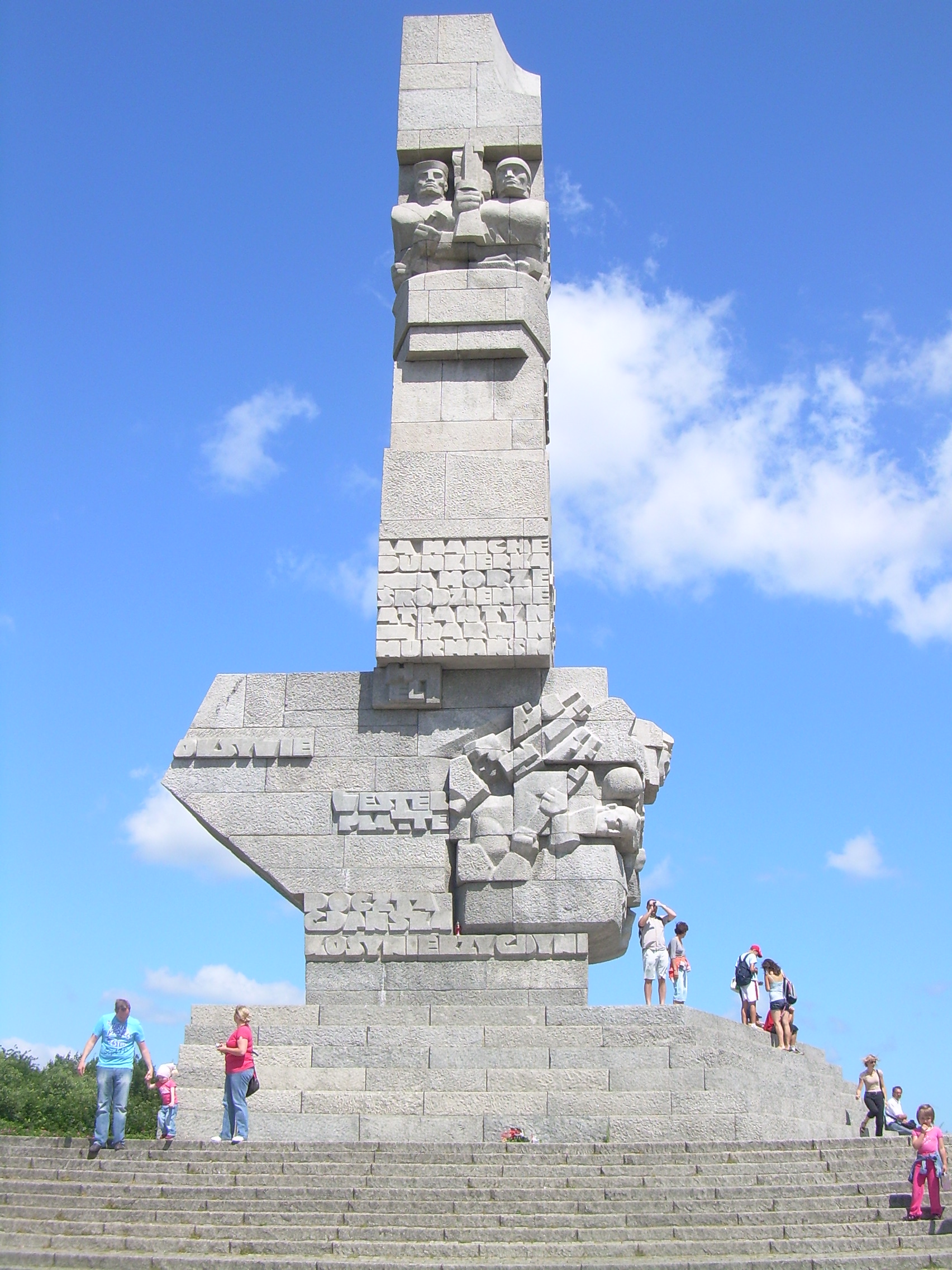
Westerplatte Monument designed by Duczeńko in collaboration with Henryk Kitowski and Adam Haupt

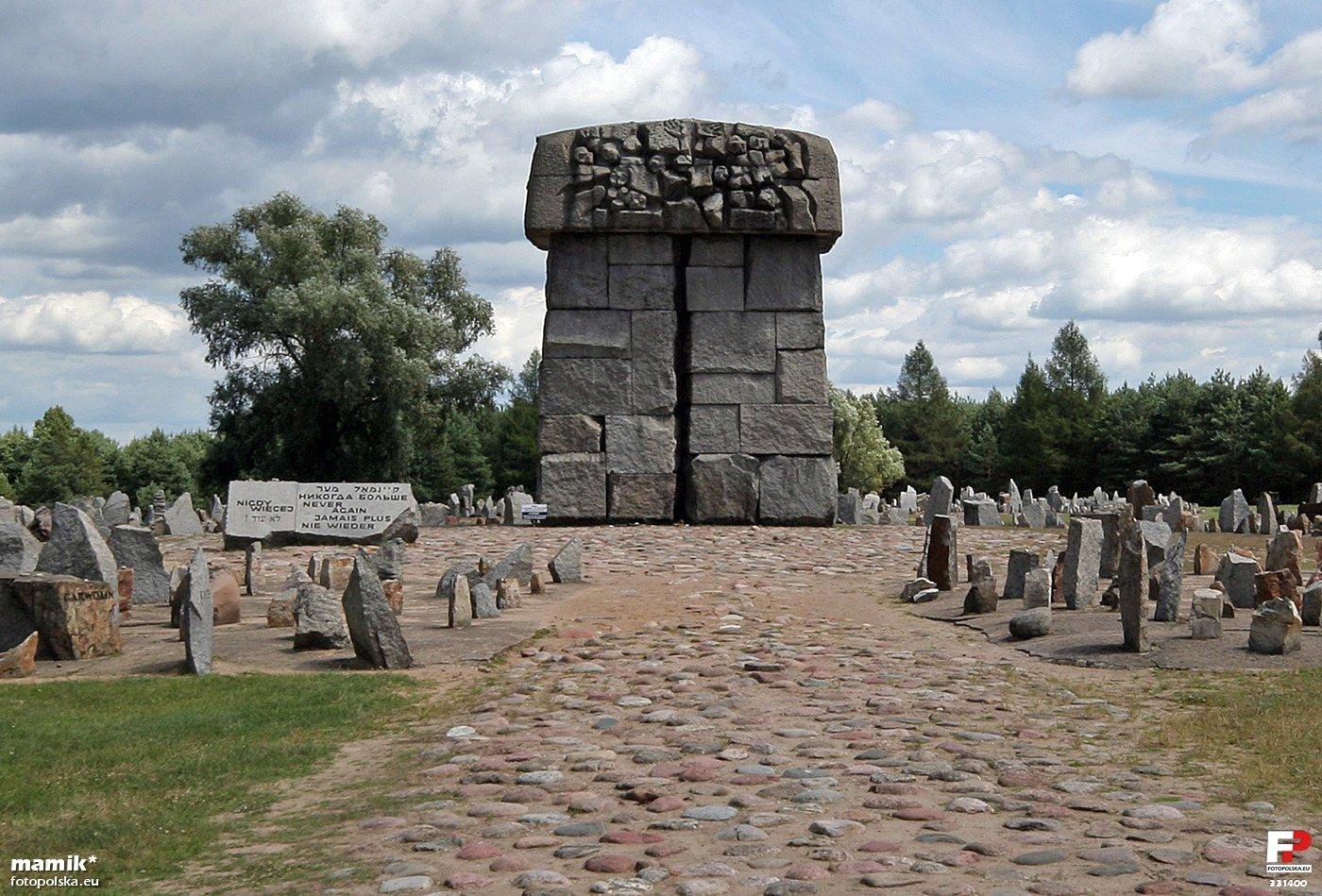
The Treblinka memorial by Franciszek Duszeńko (1958–64)

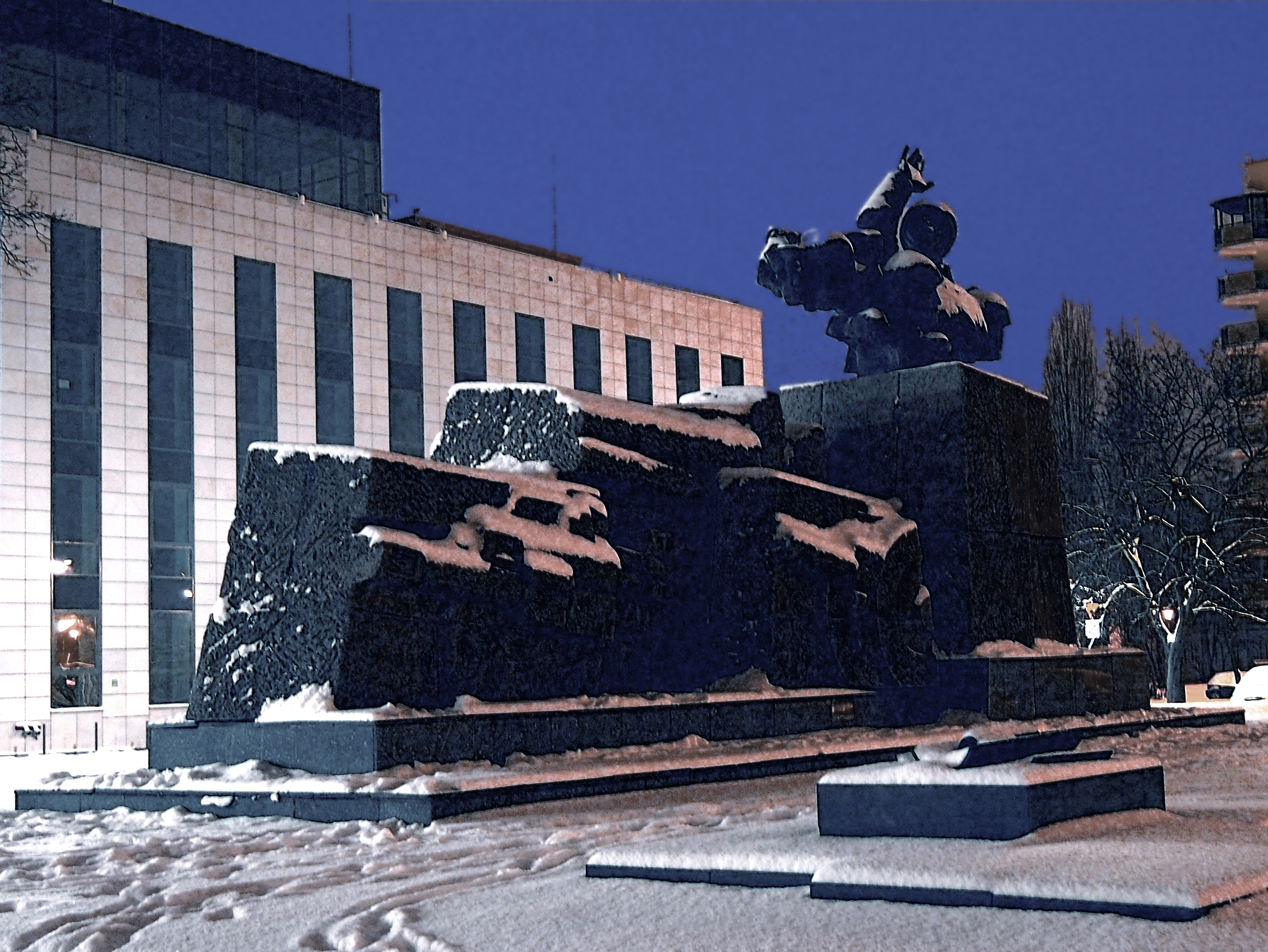
Memorial to the World War II "Polish Gunners" in Toruń

== See also ==
- Grunwald Monument
- Warsaw Uprising Monument
