= Westerplatte Monument =

War memorial located in Gdańsk, Poland

- Westerplatte Monument
- Interactive map of Westerplatte Monument
- Location: Gdańsk, Poland
- Designer: Franciszek Duszeńko, Henryk Kitowski, Adam Haupt
- Type: war memorial
- Material: granite
- Height: 25 m (82 ft)
- Beginning date: 1964
- Completion date: 1966
- Opening date: 9 October 1966
- Dedicated to: Battle of Westerplatte

The Westerplatte Monument, also known as the Monument to the Defenders of the Coast (Polish: Pomnik Obrońców Wybrzeża) is a war memorial located in Gdańsk, Poland, on the Westerplatte Peninsula in the Gdańsk harbour channel constructed between 1964–1966 to commemorate the Polish defenders of the Military Transit Depot (Wojskowa Składnica Tranzytowa, or WST) in the Battle of Westerplatte, one of the first battles in Germany's invasion of Poland, which marked the outbreak of World War II in Europe.

== History ==
The urban project including an unrealized museum was drafted by Adam Haupt, while the monument itself was designed by sculptors Franciszek Duszeńko and Henryk Kitowski. The project by Duszeńko and Kitowski was selected from 63 proposed projects.

The construction of the monument was initiated by the Council for the Protection of Struggle and Martyrdom Sites (Rada Ochrony Pamięci Walk i Męczeństwa) and consists of 236 granite blocks transported from the quarries in Strzegom and Borów and weighing 1,150 tons. The monument is decorated with bas-reliefs and inscriptions, which pay tribute to the defence of the Polish sea coast, the naval battles of WWII in which Polish sailors and soldiers took part as well as the Battle of Lenino, Battle of Studzianki and Battle of Kołobrzeg. The memorial also includes the inscription "Glory to the Liberators" (Chwała wyzwolicielom).

The shape of the monument resembles in its appearance a jagged bayonet impaled in the ground. Seven candle lights at the foot of the monument symbolically represent the seven days of heroic defence of Westerplatte by Polish soldiers against the numerically superior Nazi German army.

The 22-meter high artificial mound on which the monument is located was erected from the earth collected from the redevelopment of the Port of Gdańsk. The construction of the monument took 2 years to complete and it was ceremonially unveiled on 9 October 1966 on the anniversary of the Battle of Lenino.

Each year, official state ceremonies to commemorate the outbreak of the Second World War take place at the foot of the monument and have been attended by prominent Polish and foreign dignitaries and heads of states.

== See also ==
- Museum of the Second World War
- September Campaign
- Battle of Wizna
- Bombing of Wieluń
- History of Poland (1939–1945)

== Gallery ==
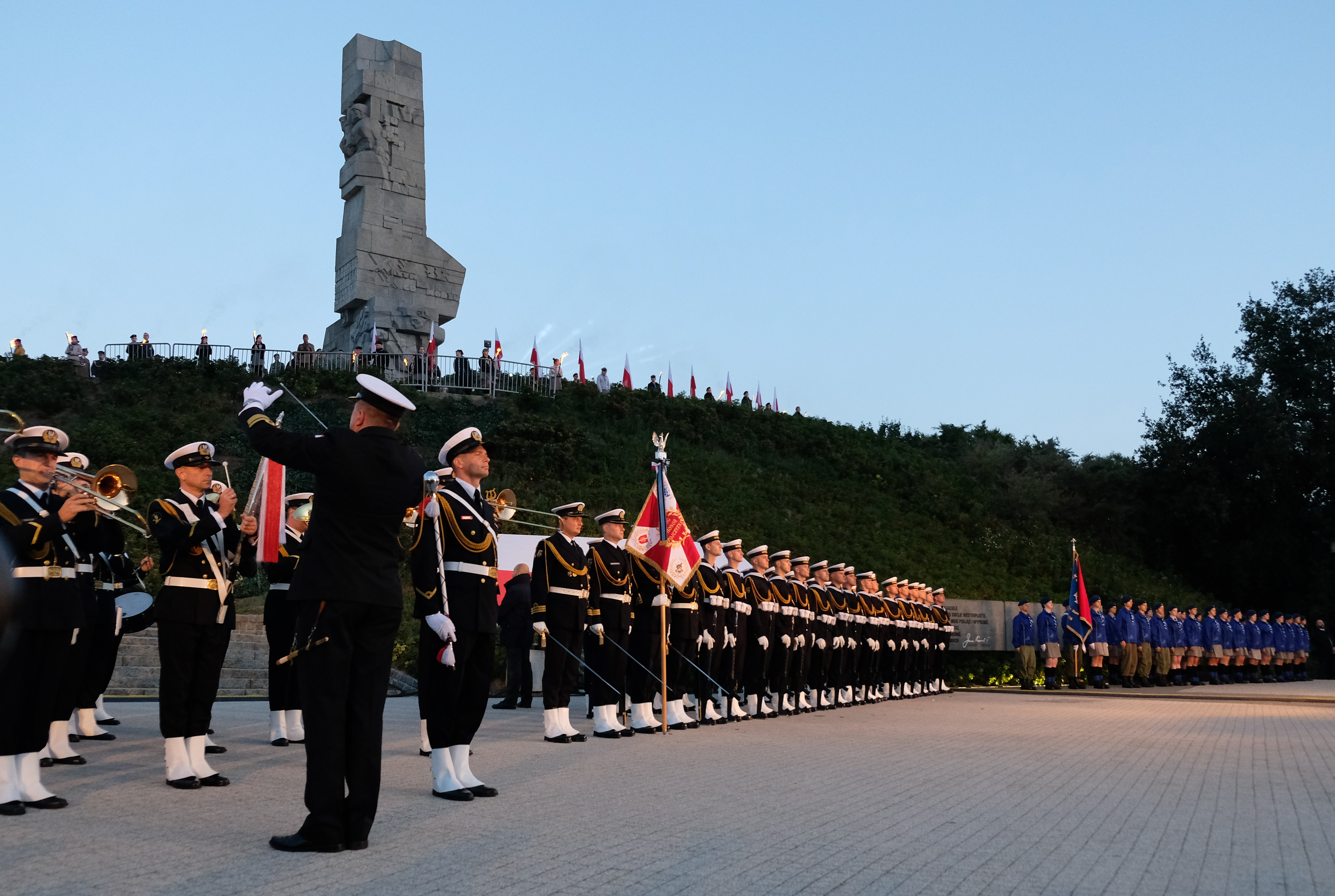
79th anniversary of the outbreak of World War II in Gdańsk

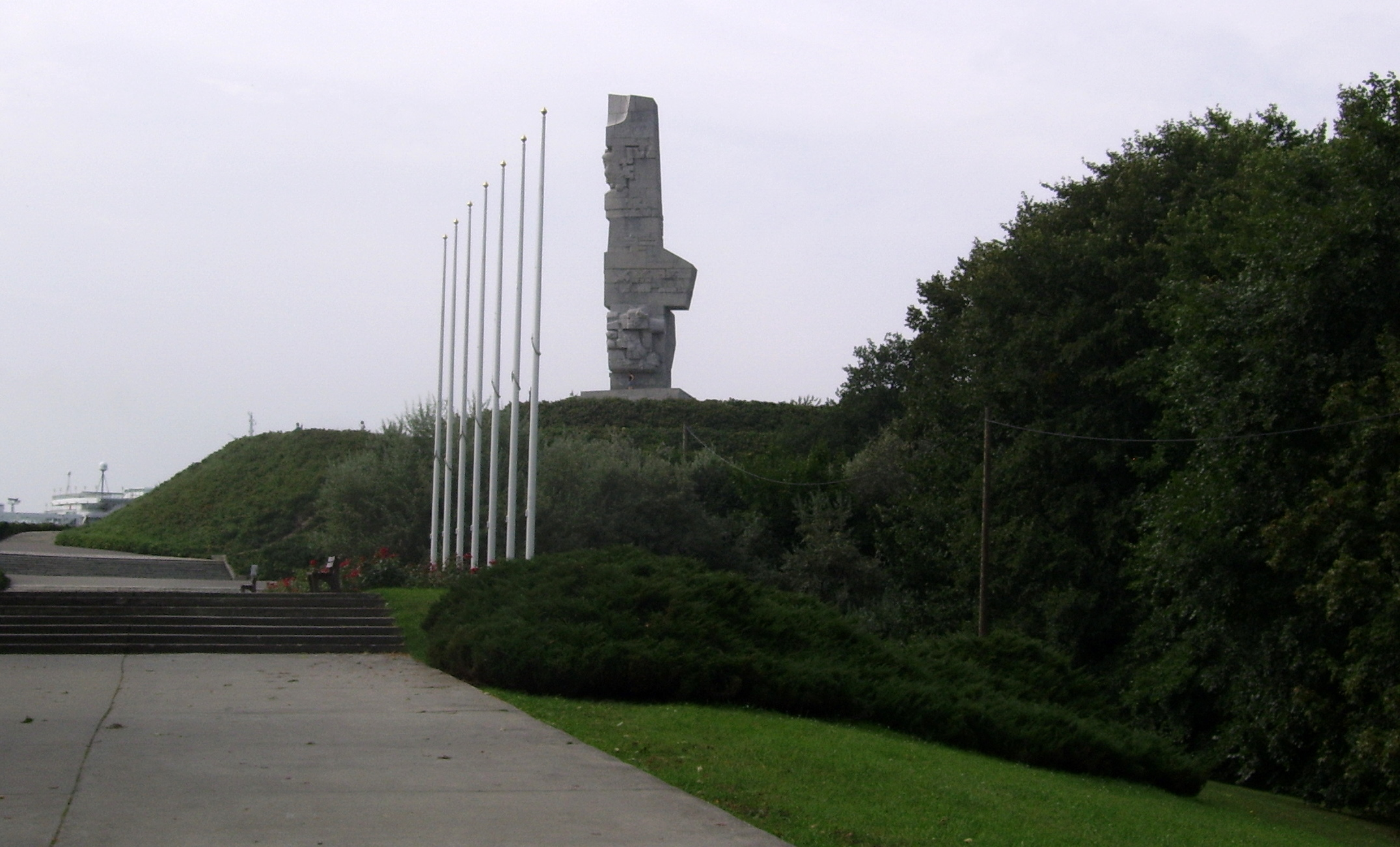
Westerplatte Monument seen from a distance

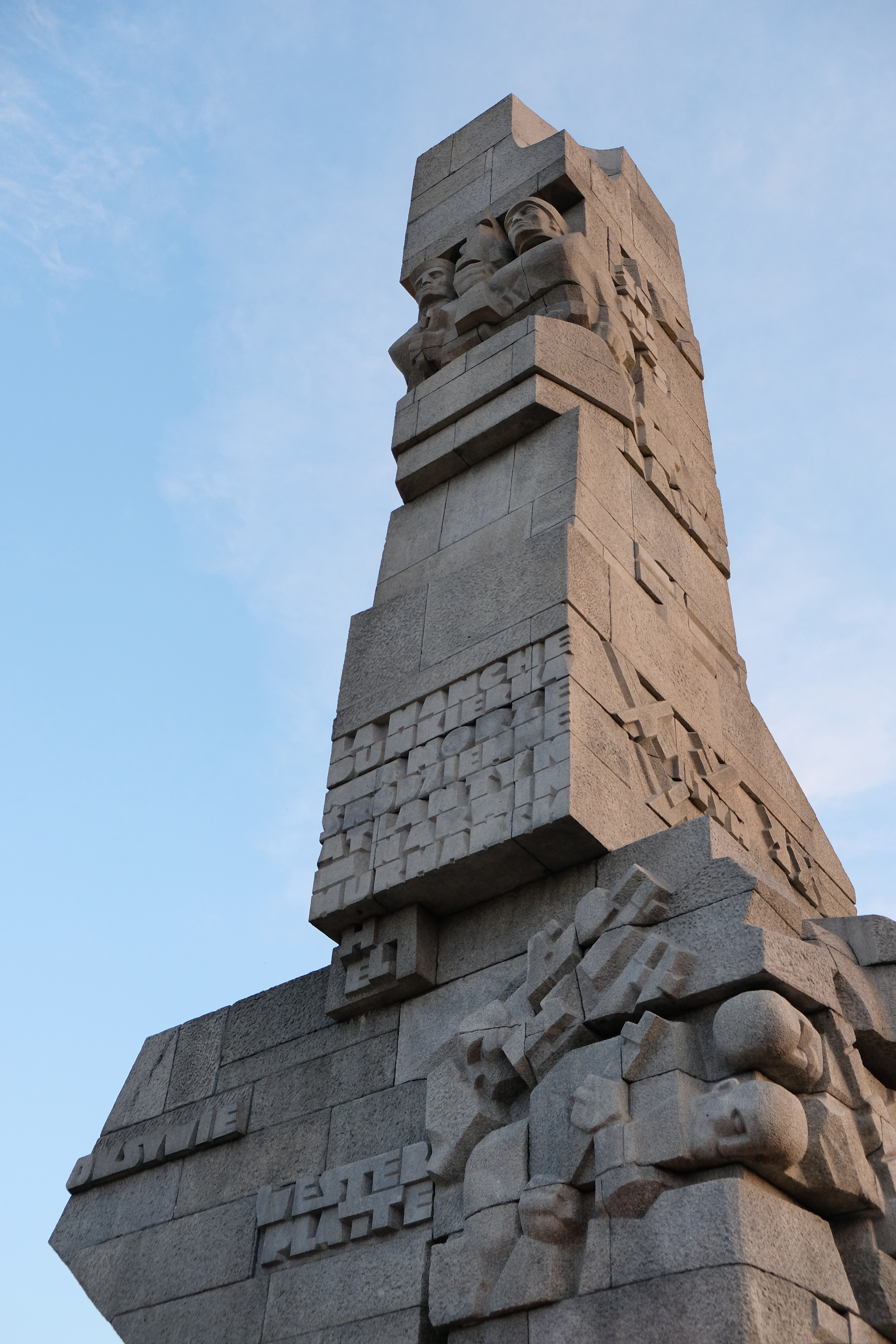
Inscriptions on the monument

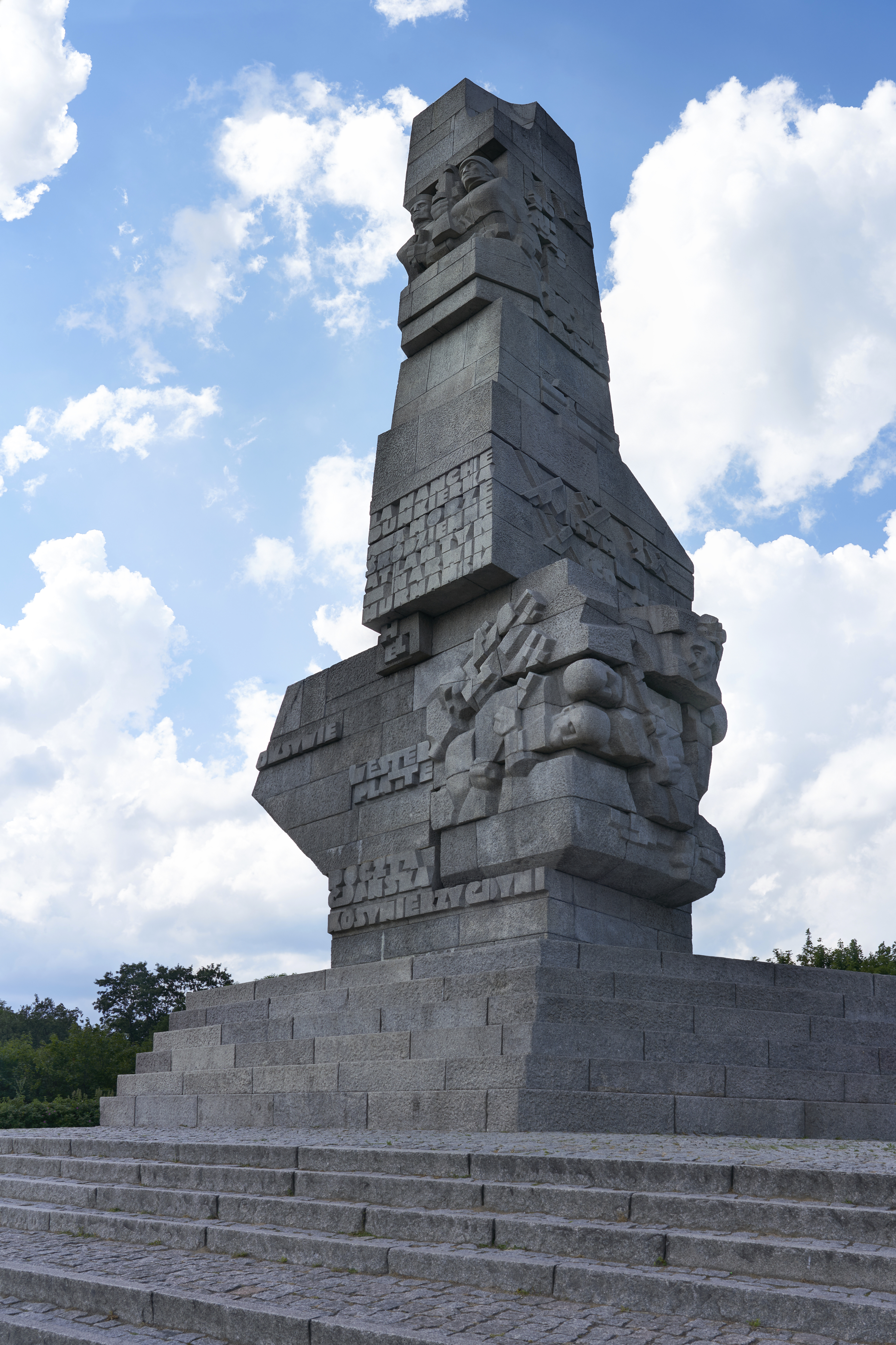
Seen from SE

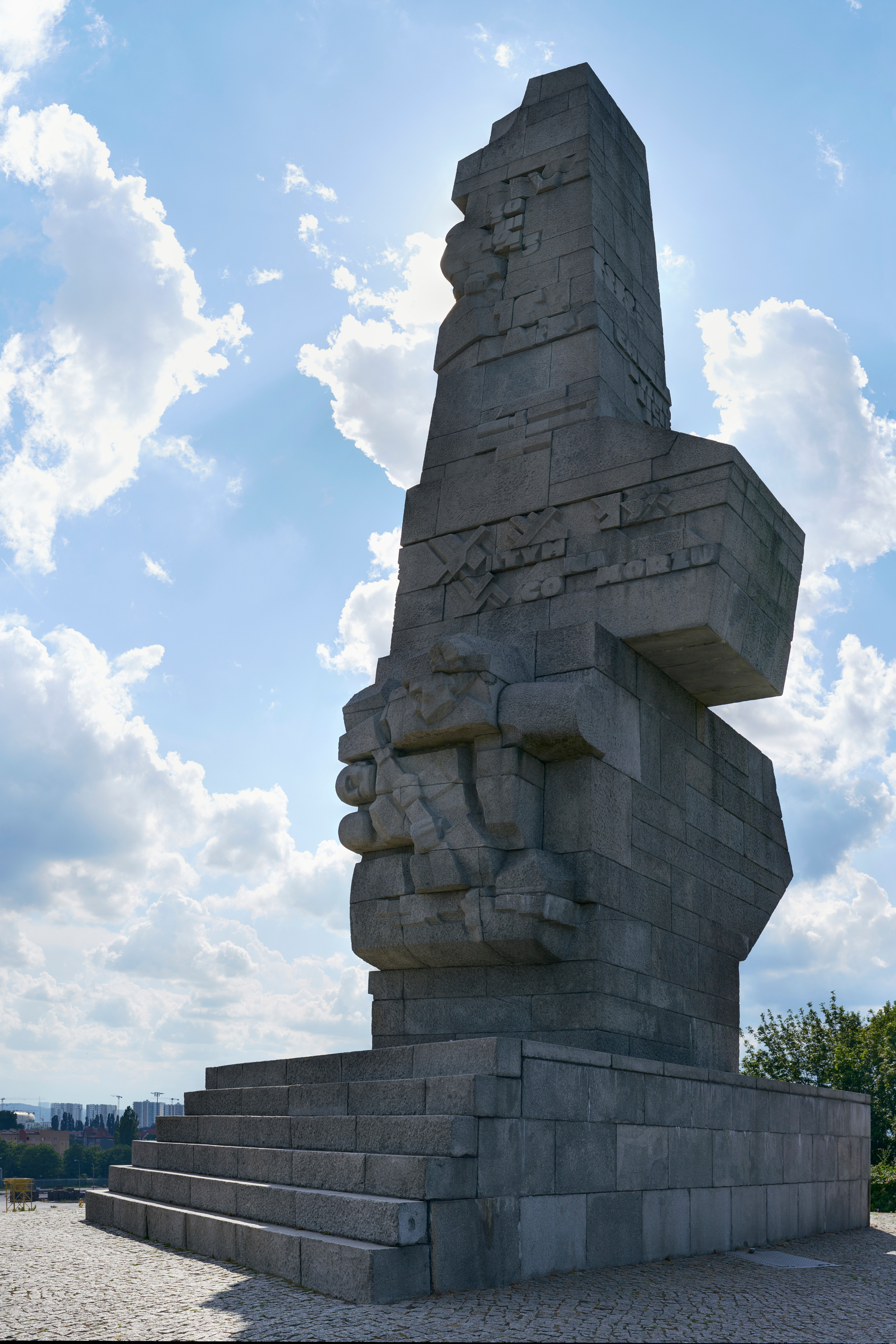
Seen from NE

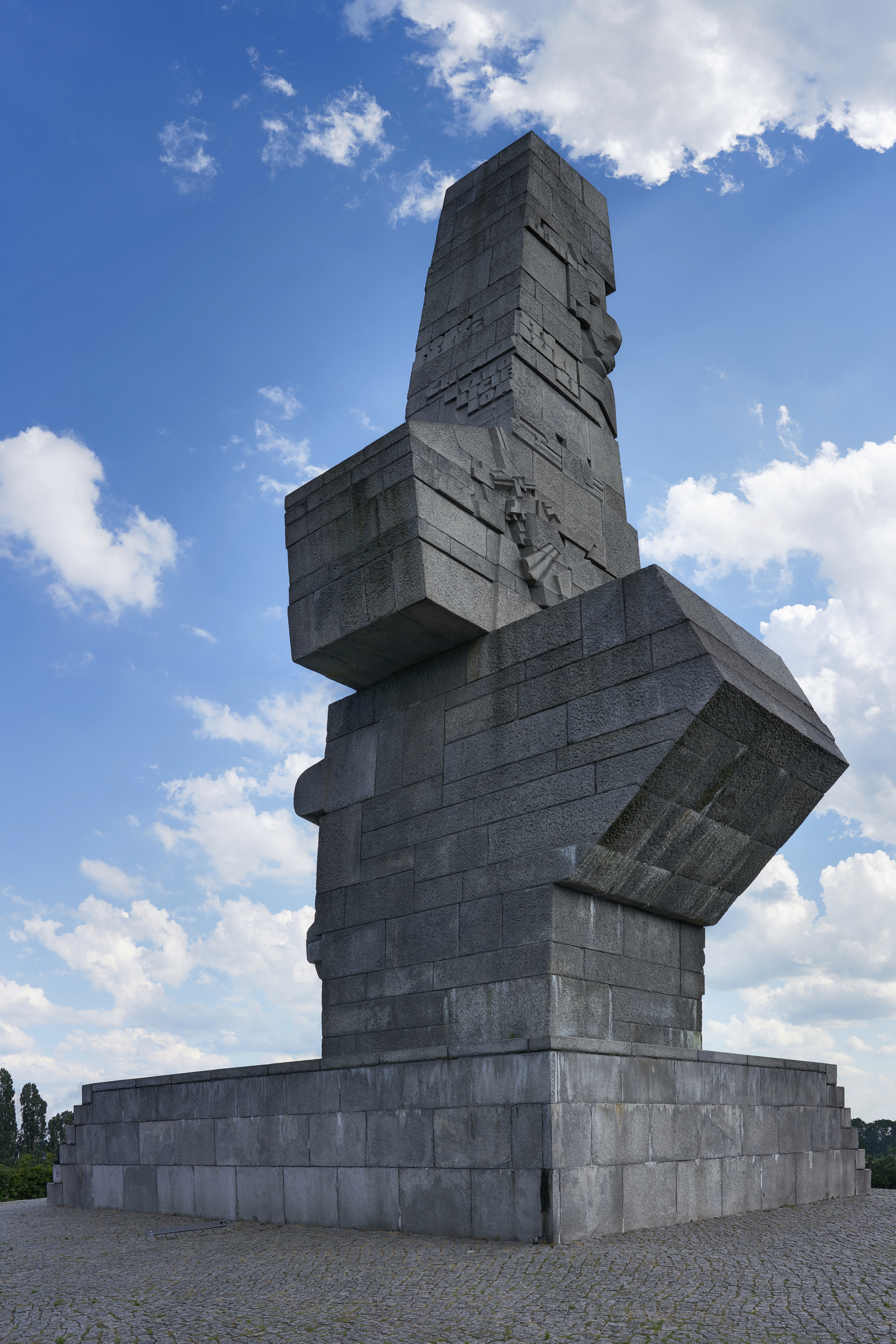
Seen from NW

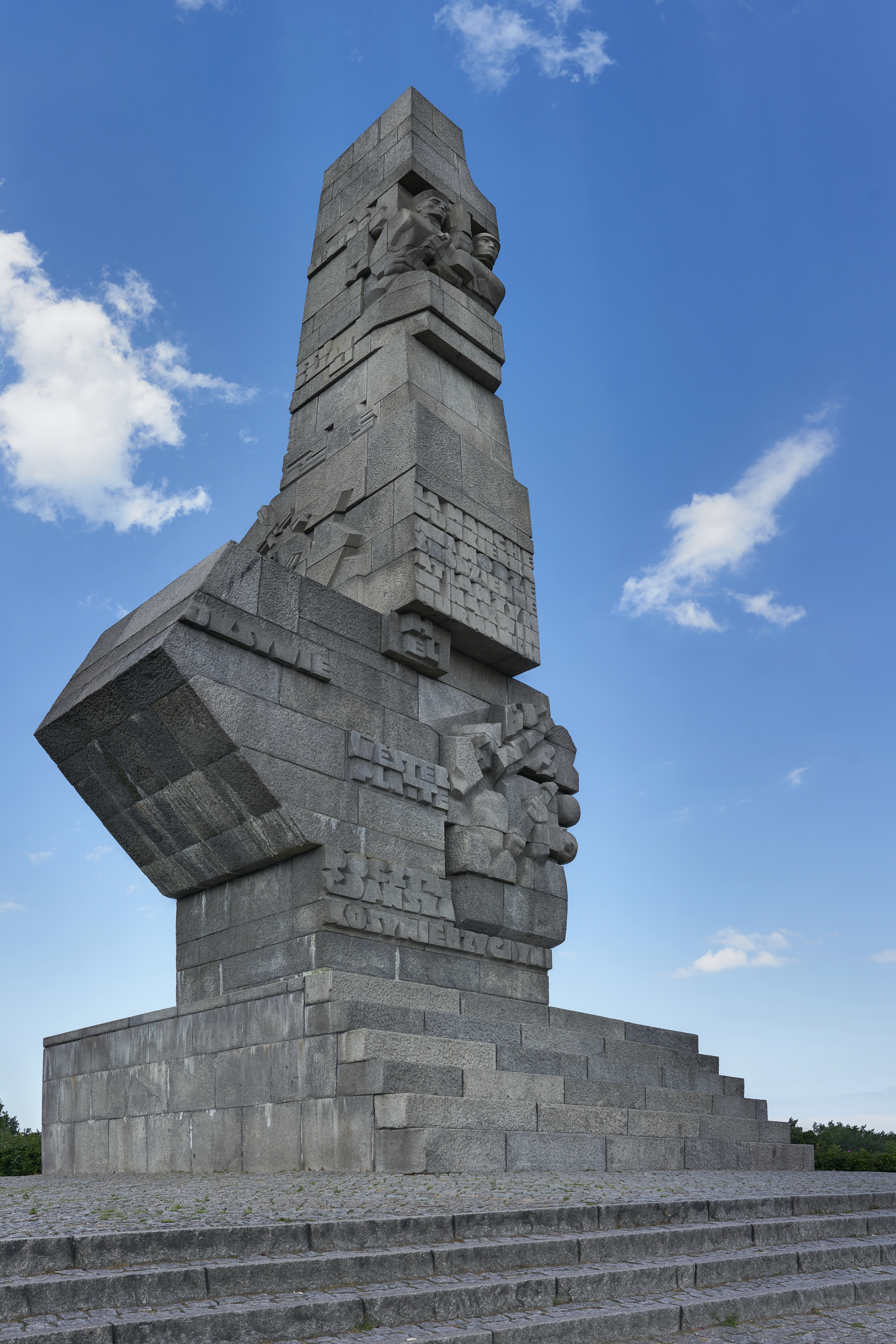
Seen from SW

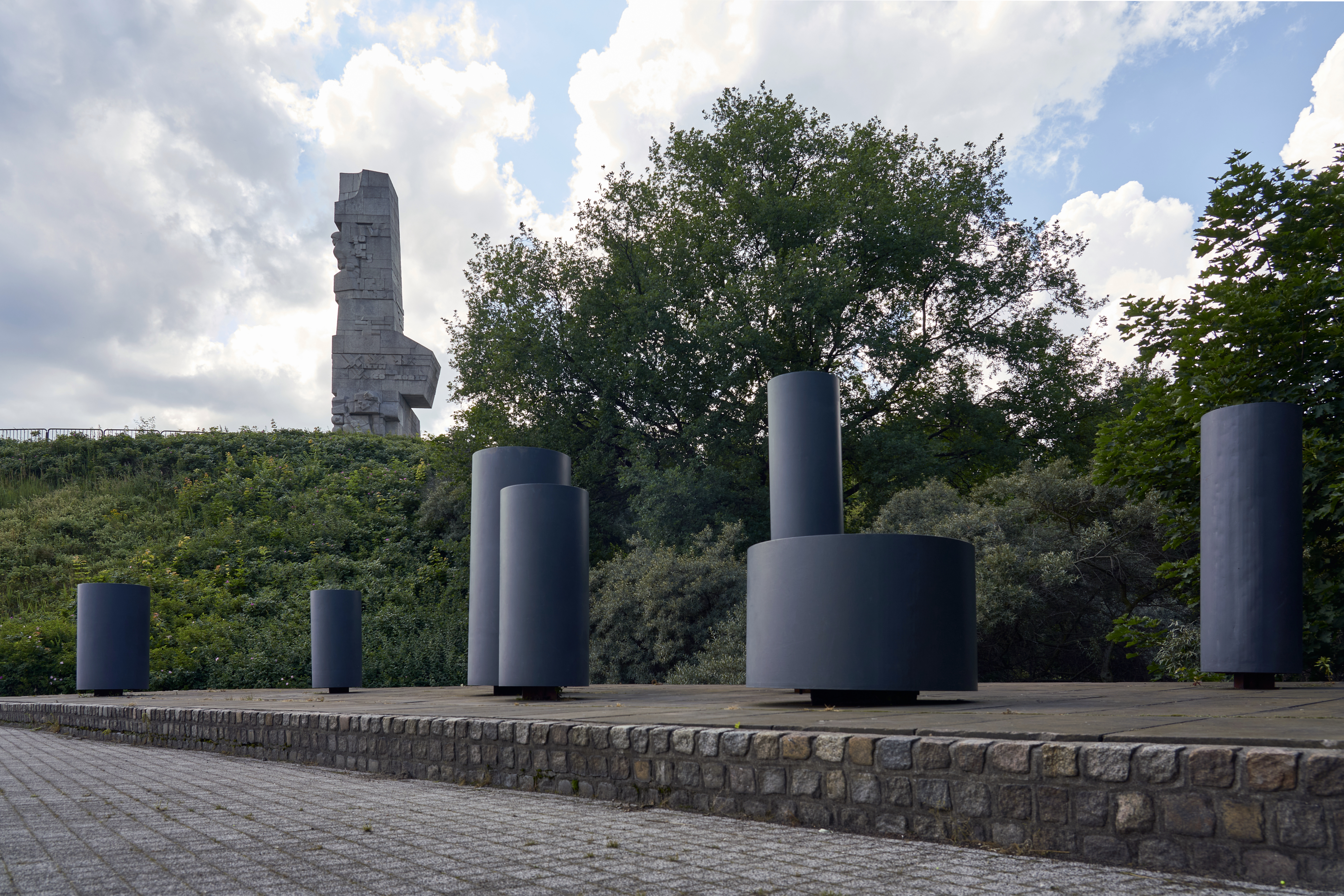
Pillars and monument
