= Chaim Chaykl of Amdur =

18th-century Hasidic rebbe

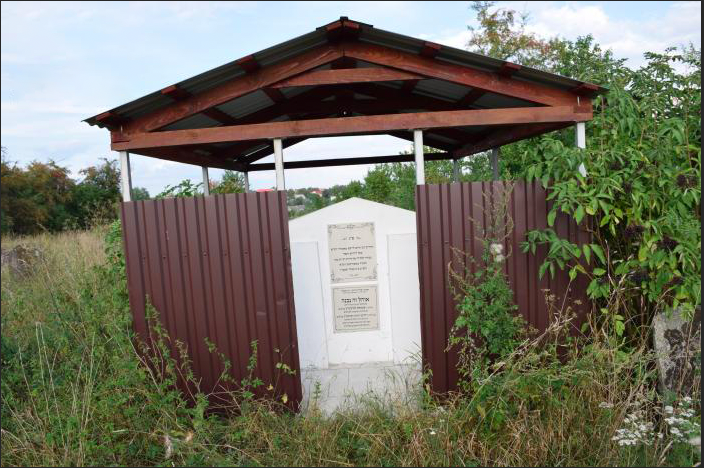
- Ohel of Chaim Chaykl in Indura, Belarus
- Title: Amdurer Rebbe

Personal life
- Born: Chaim Chaykl (Chaika) Levin; 1730
- Died: March 13, 1787 (aged 56–57) Indura, Belarus
- Buried: Indura, Belarus
- Children: Shmuel of Amdur, Dov Ber of Shadlitz, Chana, wife of Moshe Chaikin
- Parent: Rabbi Shmuel Levin (father)
- Dynasty: Amdur

Religious life
- Religion: Judaism

Jewish leader
- Predecessor: Dov Ber of Mezeritch
- Successor: Shmuel of Amdur
- Main work: Chaim V'Chessed
- Yahrtzeit: 23 Adar
- Dynasty: Amdur

Chaim Chaykl (Chaika) Levin of Amdur (Hebrew: חיים חייקל (חייקא) לוין מאמדור; c. 1730 – March 13, 1787), also known as the Amdurer Rebbe, was an 18th-century Hasidic rebbe and author who is amongst the earliest founders of Lithuanian Hasidism. A leading disciple of Dov Ber of Mezeritch, in 1773 he founded the Amdur Hasidic dynasty in Indura, Belarus where he faced fierce opposition from local Misnagdim. Despite this, Chaim Chaykl would go on to lay the foundation for several important Hasidic principles. His Divrei Torah was posthumously published in 1891 in Warsaw under the title "Chaim V'Chesed", which is now an important Hasidic work.

== Early life ==
Born around 1730, according to Hasidic tradition he was descended from an unbroken line of Tzadikim Nistarim. His father Rabbi Shmuel Levin (1700–1765) was a fervent Misnagid. In his early years, Chaim Chaykl served as a cantor in Karlin, later being sent by his father to learn at the Yeshiva of the Vilna Gaon, where he became one of the Vilna Gaon's closest disciples. In his mid-twenties, Chaim Chaykl was introduced to Hasidism by Aharon of Karlin who noticed the young Chaim Chaykl sitting and engaging in Torah. Aharon of Karlin asked Chaim Chaykl why he didn’t learn Torah using the teachings of Rabbi Meir, Chaim Chaykl responded stating that to his understanding he was in fact learning in such a fashion. Aharon answered him stating that “If so, you are making Rabbi Meir a liar!” Aharon walked away, but Chaim Chaykl soon ran after him and asked him how one reaches such a level of learning. Aharon answered that he himself didn’t know the answer, but that if Chaim Chaykl would like to find out, he should travel to Mezhirichi. Chaim Chaykl agreed and the two men travelled to Mezhirichi to learn under Dov Ber of Mezeritch, who soon accepted Chaim Chaykl as a leading disciple.

== Rabbinic career ==
After the death of Dov Ber of Mezeritch in 1772, Chaim Chaykl soon settled in Indura, where he established his own Hasidic court a year later in 1773. In the following years, he soon became the most ardent and uncompromising proponent of Hasidism in Lithuania-Belarus. He sent out several emissaries to spread the world of Amdur Hasidism, which led to thousands of young Lithuanian Hasids flocking to his court, leaving their Misnagdic backgrounds. This enraged local Misnagdim, leading to the outbreak of the second round of polemics between the two factions in 1781. He is described in detail by the Misnagdic writer, David of Makova in his work "Shever Poshe'im", in which he heavily criticizes Chaim Chaykl's proponency of popular tzadikism, especially his beliefs sounding Pidyonim. Some Misnagdim went as far as to spread rumours that Chaim Chaykl would eat milk and meat together, thus defying the laws of Kashrut.

Chaim Chaykl ultimately believed that the role of the tzadik was that of a miracle worker and that the tzadik was to serve as the imputes of God by embodying and channelling the Ayin-Yesh, through a process of mystical leadership based in Kabbalah and the philosophy of the Baal Shem Tov. He believed that the tzaddik should serve as a metaphysical figure mediating between heaven and earth, stating that his Hasidim could only communicate with God through him. This belief would later go on to influence figures like the Noam Elimelech and thus huge portions of Polish Hasidism and well as the teachings of Karlin-Stolin. Chaim Chaykl emphasized the importance of prioritizing the divine will over any human will, by abjuring physical reality and stripping the commandments of their physical nature. He once famously stated that one should aspire to make himself into nothingness by means of adopting indifference to this world and its pleasures.

Above all else, Chaim Chaykl taught that God is infinite and men cannot comprehend Him. He concluded that the observance of a mitzvah can be interpreted as an act desired by God, and it is only this desire of God's which imparts validity to the mitzvah. Thus, according to Chaim Chaykl, it was thus forbidden to serve god for the purpose of personal interest. He believed that when a man stands before God and evil thoughts enter his mind, one should not repel them, but rather elevate these thoughts to their source. In the court of Amdur, if one has sinned, he should unite himself to the soul of the tzadik above all else. The ideals of religious ecstasy and joy were fundamental to Amdur Hasidism and Chaim Chaykl clearly taught that a life of joy arises from religious awe, devotion, and the proximity to God one achieves by minimizing preoccupation with the physicalness. He was known to have prayed with intense Kavanah, allegedly even doing somersaults during prayer, which was an entirely ecstatic process in Amdur. Following Chaim Chaykl's death in 1787, he was succeeded by his son Shmuel of Amdur, who later left Amdur to become a disciple of Shneur Zalman of Liadi. Nosson of Makova was his son-in-law.

About one hundred years after his death, several of Chaim Chaykl's Divrei Torah were posthumously published in 1891 in Warsaw under the time "Chaim V'Chesed".

== See also ==
- Chaim V'Chessed - Reprint of the work, published in 1975 in Jerusalem; Hebrewbooks.org.
