= Indura =

Indura Індура
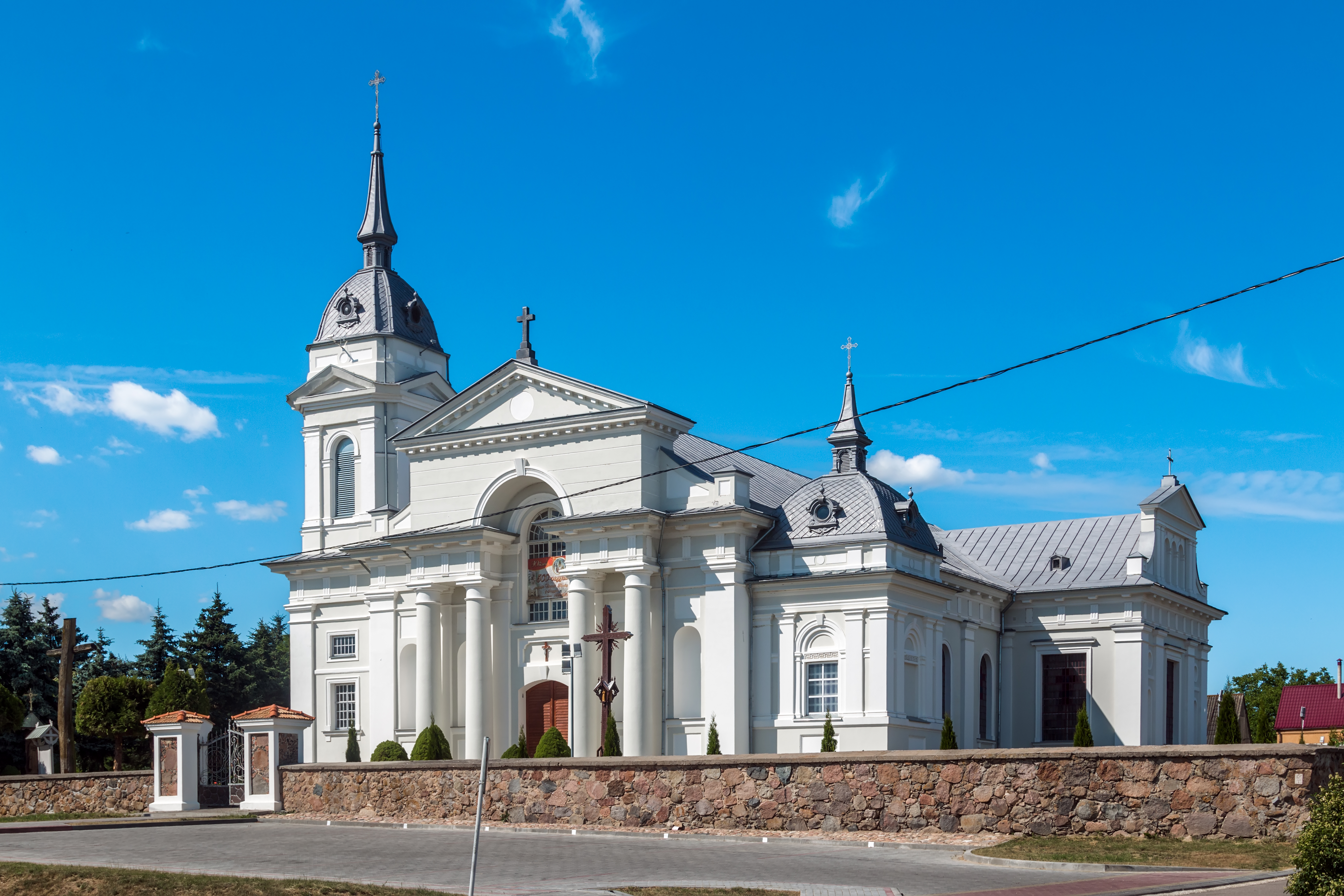
- Holy Trinity church in Indura
- Interactive map of Indura
- Location within Belarus
- Coordinates: 53.4597°N 23.8839°E
- Country: Belarus
- Region: Hrodna Region
- District: Grodno District
- Founded: 1522

Area
  - Total: 1.781 km^{2} (0.688 sq mi)
- Elevation: 142 m (466 ft)

Population (2009)
  - Total: 1,360
  - Density: 764/km^{2} (1,980/sq mi)
- Time zone: UTC+3 (MSK)
- Postal code: 231712
- Area code: +375
- License plate: 4

Indura (Belarusian: Індура; Russian: Индура; Polish: Indura; Yiddish: אמדור, romanized: Amdur) is a village in the Grodno District of the Grodno Region of Belarus.

The town's name in Yiddish is Amdur, which lends its name to the Amdur Hasidic dynasty founded by Chaim Chaykl of Amdur.

== History ==
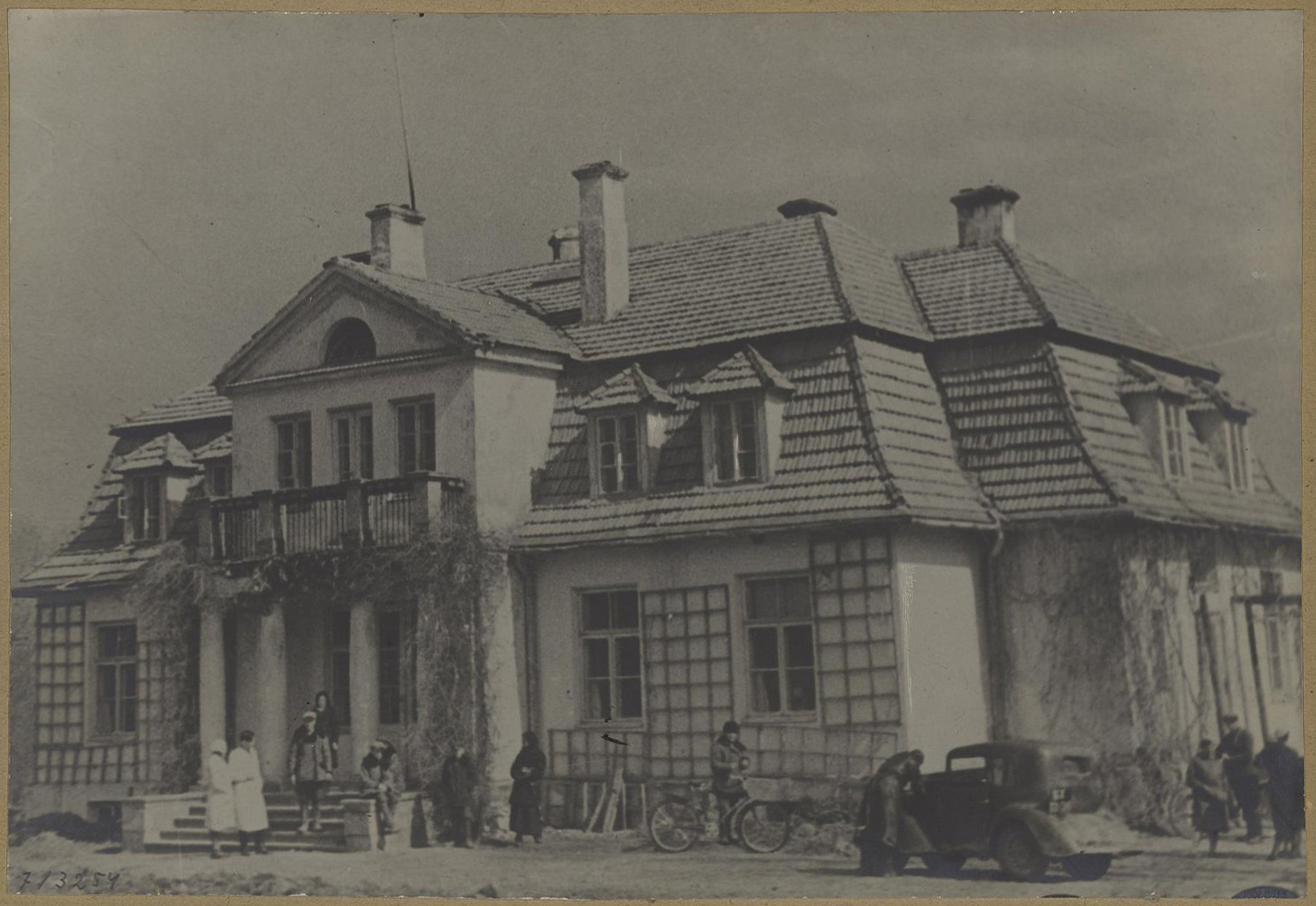
Ogiński manor in 1940

The first mention of Indura appears in the 16th century, when the settlement was under the rule of Jan Dovojnovich, who, in 1522, built a wooden church of the Holy Trinity in Indura. Between the 16th and 17th century, Indura was under the rule of Radziwiłł, Pac, and Kiszka families, later being owned by the Ogiński and Massalski families in the 18th century. Following the third partition of the Polish-Lithuanian Commonwealth in 1795, Indura became a part of the Russian Empire in the Grodno district and was under the rule of the Brzhostovsky family.

In 1815, a stone church was built in the town and in 1881 the Orthodox church of St Alexander Nevsky was built, which still stands to this day. In 1885, a synagogue was built which also stands to this day. According to the Riga Peace Treaty of 1921, Indura fell into the interwar Polish Republic, within which it was administratively located in the Białystok Voivodeship. In the 1921 census, 64.9% people declared Jewish nationality, 33.1% people declared Polish nationality, and 1.8% declared Belarusian nationality.

On 17 September 1939, after the Soviet invasion of Poland at the start of World War II, Indura became part of the USSR, since 1940 it has been the center of the village council. From June 1941 to 21 July 1944 it was under German occupation. The Jews of the village (about 2,000 people) were herded into a ghetto, and in 1942 they were sent to death camps.

== Attractions ==
- Church of the Holy Trinity, 1815.
- Orthodox Church of Saint Alexander Nevsky, 1881.
- Amdur Synagogue, 1885.
- Noble estate, 19th century, the manor house and farm buildings have been preserved.
- Jewish cemetery.
