= Hasidic Judaism in Lithuania =

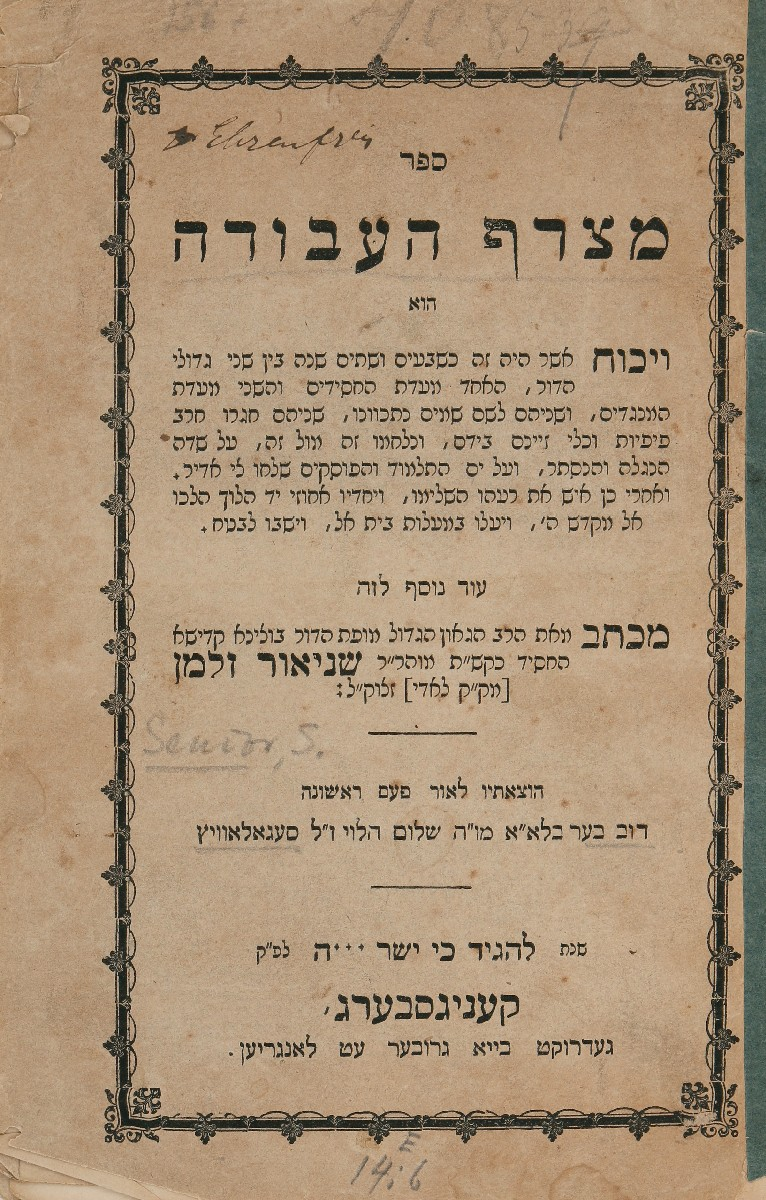
Mitzraf HaAvodah, a debate between Hasidim and Misnagdim, by Rabbi Shneur Zalman of Liadi

Hasidic Judaism in Lithuania is the history of Hasidic Judaism and Hasidic philosophy in Lithuania and parts of modern-day Belarus. Hasidic Judaism in Lithuania began with R. Aaron Perlow of Karlin (Karalin) (1736–1772), R. Menachem Mendel of Vitebsk (1730?–1788) R. Shneur Zalman of Liadi (Lyady) (1745–1812) and to a lesser extent R. Hayim Haykl of Amdur (Indura) (d. 1787), all of whom were disciples of R. Dov Ber of Mezeritch (Mezhirichi) (c. 1704–1772), who in part was the successor to the R. Israel Baal Shem Tov (c. 1698–1760) who founded Hasidic Judaism in Western Ukraine. In its earliest years, Lithuanian Hasidism suffered immense persecution by the Lithuanian Misnagdic rabbinate, who attempted to ban and excommunicate Hasidism on several occasions in Lithuania beginning with R. Elijah b. Solomon Zalman of Vilna (1720–1797), who was the earliest disseminator of anti-Hasidic thought which flourished in Lithuania.

== Early history ==
Cities mentioned in this article.
Blue = Karlin; Red = Chabad; Black = other

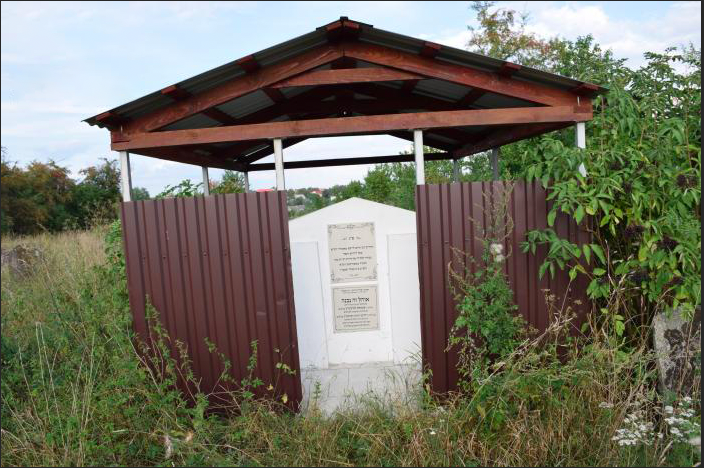
Ohel of Rabbi Chaim Chaykl of Amdur

According to Hasidic lore, R. Aaron Perlow had once found himself in the town of Amdur, where R. Hayim Haykl was a local cantor. R. Aaron noticed the young R. Hayim Haykl sitting and engaging in Torah study. R. Aaron asked R. Hayim Haykl why he didn't learn Torah using the teachings of Rabbi Meir to which R. Hayim Haykl responded stating that to his understanding he was in fact learning in such a fashion. R. Aaron answered him stating that “If so, you are making Rabbi Meir a liar!” R. Aaron walked away, but R. Hayim Haykl soon ran after him and asked him how one reaches such a level of learning. R. Aaron answered that he himself didn't know the answer, but that if R. Hayim Haykl would like to find out, he should travel to Mezhirichi with R. Aaron to learn by R. Dov Ber of Mezeritch. The two both soon became close disciples of R. Dov Ber, and in 1765, R. Aaron was delegated by R. Dov Ber to bring Hasidism to Lithuania. That year, R. Aaron established a Hasidic court in Karlin, which soon became a great centre of Hasidism in Europe. R. Aaron had many students from Misnagdic families, and he was thus viewed by the mainstream rabbinate as a polluter of the youth. Many leading local rabbis went as far as to impose a herem on Hasidim and on R. Aaron. Yet throughout all of this, R. Aaron still received thousands of followers yearly. R. Aaron is best known for his personal asceticism and for the mystical nature of his prayers. Lithuanian Hasidism placed a specific emphasis on prayer, which was often immensely enthusiastic with an emphasis on closeness to God (Devekus). This style of prayer, was one of the main points used by Misnagdim against Hasidism in Lithuania. Although he published no works, R. Aaron left a highly influential ethical will, along with azharot (warnings) concerning the proper worship of God, which was reprinted in later Karliner publications.

After R. Aaron's death in 1772, he was succeeded by his closest disciple, R. Solomon ha-Levi of Karlin (1738–1792), who soon became the leader of Lithuanian and Belarusian Karlin Hasidism for the ensuing 20 years.

It was also in 1772, after R. Aaron's death, that R. Hayim Haykl established a Hasidic court in Indura (Amdur) which soon also became a centre of Hasidism in Europe. R. Hayim Haykl was perhaps the most fiery and intense of the Lithuanian tzaddikim, who faced the most opposition from Misnagdic rabbis. R. Hayim Haykl would send out emissaries to spread the world of Hasidism, which led to thousands of young Lithuanian Hasidim flocking to his court, leaving their Misnagdic backgrounds. R. Hayim Haykl ultimately believed that the role of the tzadik (i.e. rebbe) was that of a miracle worker and as a metaphysical figure mediating between heaven and earth, stating that his Hasidim could only communicate with God through him. After R. Hayim Haykl's death, the majority of his Hasidim went to Karlin, however some remained loyal to his son, R. Samuel of Amdur (d. 1799), who is the progenitor of the Amdur Hasidic dynasty, which only lasted a few generations. R. Hayim Haykl's son-in-law, R. Nathan of Makow (d. 1825) established a Hasidic court in Makow, Poland. His descendants married into the Peshischa Hasidic dynasty, which was the main school of thought in Polish Hasidism.

== Karlin ==
R. Solomon of Karlin was known for his intense worship of God, which often occupied him for much of the day. In fact, he was in the middle of prayer when he was fatally shot by a Russian commander. After his death, R. Solomon was succeeded by R. Asher Perlow (1760–1826), the son of R. Aaron, who became the progenitor of the Karlin-Stolin Hasidic dynasty. The Karlin-Stolin dynasty remained unbroken for the next three generations, until the death of R. Israel Perlow [HE] (1869–1921), who was succeeded by four of his sons. While two were killed in the Holocaust, his sons R. Jacob Hayim Perlow (d. 1946) and R. Yochanan Perlow [HE] (1900–1956). After R. Yochahan's death, most of the hasidim went on to follow his son-in-law, R. Barukh Meir Jacob Shochet (b. 1955), who is the current Karliner Rebbe. Additionally, many Karliner Hasidim accepted, the Lelover Rebbe, R. Moses Mordecai Biderman (1903–1987), as R. Yochanan's successor, and from him derives the Pinsk-Karlin Hasidic group. Additionally, after R. Solomon's death, many of his disciples established their own Hasidic courts.

=== Lechovitch ===
R. Solomon of Karlin's disciple, R. Mordechai Jaffe (d. 1810) established the Lechovitch Hasidic dynasty, which was continued by his son, R. Noach Jaffe (d. 1832), who in part was succeeded by his son-in-law R. Mordechai Malovitzky (maternal grandson of R. Solomon of Karlin). R. Mordechai's son-in-law was R. Moses Aaron of Vileika (d. 1846), the son of R. Samuel of Amdur. Lastly R. Mordecai's grandson (the son of his youngest son, R. Aaron Jaffe (d. 1807), who was the son-in-law of R. Asher Perlow of Karlin) was R. Solomon Haim Perlow (1797–1862), who adopted his mother's maiden name and established the Koidanov Hasidic dynasty. R. Solomon Haim's son-in-law was R. Simon Katzenellenbogen, whose son, R. Jacob Perlow (1843–1902) adopted his mother's maiden name and established the Novominsk Hasidic dynasty in Poland. After the death of R. Noach Jaffe, his disciple, R. Moses Polier (1784–1858), established the Kobrin Hasidic dynasty. R. Moses Polier's disciple, R. Abraham Weinberg (1804–1883), established the Slonim Hasidic dynasty.

=== Other dynasties ===
The Strelisk Hasidic dynasty was largely influenced by Karlin, despite being a Ukrainian group. The founder of the Strelisk dynasty, R. Uri of Strelisk (1757–1826) was known for praying with an exceptional fervor and excitement, and it is said that thousands of Jews would come to pray with him. R. Uri's disciple, R. Judah Tzvi Brandwein (1780–1884), founded the Stretin Hasidic dynasty.

== Chabad ==
While Karlin played a central role in influencing Hasidism in western Belarus, the Hasidic group of Chabad-Lubavitch dominated Hasidic society in eastern Belarus, with their strongholds in Lyubavichi, Lyady, and Liozna. Originally, the Hasidim of Belarus were led by R. Menahem Mendel of Vitebsk. However, after R. Menahem Mendel's emigration to the Israel, R. Shneur Zalman of Liadi, the first rebbe of Chabad and author of the Tanya, took his place; however, the Karliner communities remained independent of Chabad. Later Chabad rebbes in Europe were the Mitteler Rebbe, the Tzemach Tzedek, the Rebbe Maharash, the Rebbe Rashab, and the Rebbe Rayatz.

=== Chochmah, Binah, and Daat ===
One of the basic values of Chabad are three processes of a person's intellect: Chochmah, Binah, and Daat. So central is this approach in the group's philosophy that their name, CHaBaD, is an acronym of these three things. Chabad differs from other Hasidic groups in that they focus primarily on using one's mind for to serve God, while the Rebbes of other groups stress channeling one's heart in service.

=== "Zalman Borukhovich" and "the tzaddikim of the Karliner sect" ===
In 1797, the leading Rebbe of Belarus R. Shneur Zalman of Liadi, who had helped in supporting needy Jews in the Ottoman Empire, was accused by Vilnius' Misnagdim of aiding Russia's enemy, the Ottomans. The following year, he was imprisoned on account of treason together with twenty-two Karliners. At this time, he was known as a "Zalman Borukhovich" while the Karliners were called "the tzaddikim of the Karliner sect."

== Outline of Lithuanian Hasidic dynasties ==
- Rabbi Israel Baal Shem Tov, founder of Hasidic Judaism
  - Rabbi Dov Ber of Mezeritch, the Maggid of Mezeritch, his successor.
    After his death, his students Rabbi Aharon Perlow of Karlin, Rabbi Chaim Chaykl Levine of Amdur, and Rabbi Shneur Zalman of Liadi, established their own Hasidic courts, all of which branched into more courts.
    - Karlin, founded in the mid-18th century by Rabbi Aharon of Karlin, student of the Maggid of Mezeritch
      - Lechovitch, founded in 1772 by Rabbi Mordechai of Lechovitch, student of Rabbi Shlomo Karlin
        - Koidanov, founded in 1883 by Rabbi Shlomo Chaim Perlow, son of Rabbi Aharon Jaffe, grandson of Rabbi Mordechai Jaffe of Lechovitch, nephew of Rabbi Noach Jaffe of Lechovitch
          - Novominsk, founded in 1896 by Rabbi Yaakov Perlow, grandson and adopted-son of Rabbi Shlomo Chaim of Koidanov
        - Kobrin, founded 1832 by Rabbi Moshe Polier, student of Rabbis Mordechai and Noach of Lechovitch
          - Slonim, founded in 1858 by Rabbi Avraham Weinberg, student of Rabbi Moshe Polier of Kobrin
      - Ludmir, founded in 1797 by Rabbi Moshe Gottlieb, son of Rabbi Shlomo of Karlin
      - Strelisk, founded in 1797 by Rabbi Uri of Strelisk, student of Rabbi Shlomo of Karlin
      - Stretin, founded c. 1826 by Rabbi Yehuda Tzvi Brandwein, student of Rabbi Uri of Strelisk
      - Pinsk-Karlin, founded in 1961
    - Chabad, founded in 1775 by Rabbi Shneur Zalman of Liadi, student of the Maggid of Mezeritch
      - Strashelye, founded in 1812 by Rabbi Aharon Hurwitz, student of Rabbi Shneur Zalman of Liadi
      - Kopust, founded in 1866 by Rabbi Yehuda Leib Shneerson, son of Rabbi Menachem Mendel Schneersohn of Lubavitch
      - Avrutch founded in 1866 by Rabbi Yosef Yitzchak Schneersohn, son of Rabbi Menachem Mendel Schneersohn of Lubavitch
      - Liadi founded in 1866 by Rabbi Chaim Schneur Zalman Schneersohn, son of Rabbi Menachem Mendel Schneersohn of Lubavitch
      - Niezhin founded in 1866 by Rabbi Yisrael Noach Schneersohn, son of Rabbi Menachem Mendel Schneersohn of Lubavitch
      - Malachim founded between 1923 and 1938 by Rabbi Chaim Avraham Dov Ber Levine, student of Rabbi Sholom Dovber Schneersohn of Lubavitch
    - Amdur, founded c. 1774 by Rabbi Chaim Chaykl of Amdur, student of the Maggid of Mezeritch
      - Makov, founded by Rabbi Nosson Nuta of Makov (1765 - 1825), son-in-law of Rabbi Chaim Chaykl of Amdur

== Other rebbes ==
There were several individual rebbes who served in Lithuania besides for those dynasties detailed above. For example, before Rabbi Aaron of Karlin founded his court in Karlin, the Maggid of Mezeritch had sent a different student of his, Rabbi Pinchas Horowitz (the Hafla'ah) to Lyakhavichy in 1765, in addition to preachers who traveled throughout the region spreading Hasidism; among these preachers was Rabbi Zev Wolf of Grodno. Similarly, Rabbi Menachem Mendel of Vitebsk served as rebbe of Minsk and after the passing of the Maggid in 1772, he became the leader of all Lithuanian Hasidism. However, in 1777, he emigrated to the land of Israel. Additionally, members of the Nikolsburg Hasidic dynasty such as R. Elijah Solomon ha-Levi Horowitz-Winograd (1842–1878), held a rabbinic post in Lida.

== See also ==
- Hasidic Judaism in Poland
- Hasidic philosophy
- Timeline of Jewish history in Lithuania
