= Litvaks =

Ashkenazi Jewish ethnic subgroup

Regions with significant populations
- Israel: 200,000
- Lithuania: 2,256

Languages
- Yiddish; Hebrew; Russian; Polish; Lithuanian

Religion
- Judaism

Related ethnic groups
- Other Ashkenazi Jews; Belarusian Jews, Russian Jews, Latvian Jews, Ukrainian Jews, Estonian Jews, Polish Jews

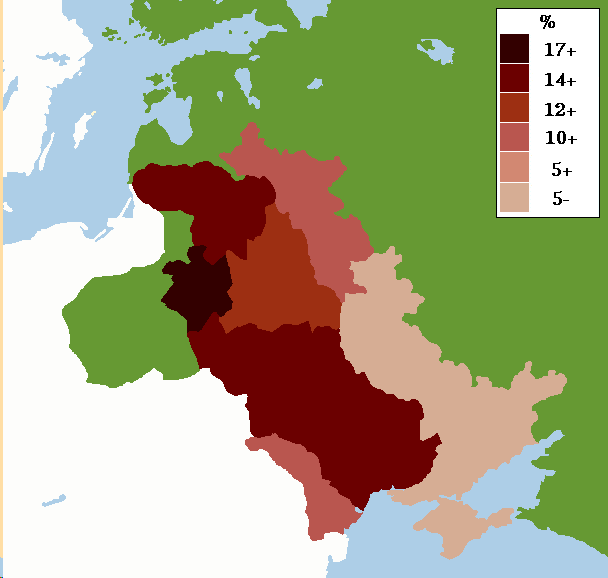
Map showing percentage of Jews in the Pale of Settlement in the Russian Empire c. 1905

Litvaks (Yiddish: ליטװאַקעס) or Lita'im (Hebrew: לִיטָאִים) are Jews who historically resided in the territory of the former Grand Duchy of Lithuania (covering present-day Lithuania, Belarus, Latvia, the northeastern Suwałki and Białystok regions of Poland, as well as adjacent areas of modern-day Russia and Ukraine), and of the Polish-Lithuanian Commonwealth (1569-1795). Over 90% of the population was killed during the Holocaust. The term is sometimes used to cover all Haredi Jews who follow an Ashkenazi, non-Hasidic style of life and learning, whatever their ethnic background. The area where Litvaks lived is referred to in Yiddish as ליטע Lite, hence the Hebrew term Lita'im (לִיטָאִים).

No other Jew is more closely linked to a specifically Lithuanian city than the Vilna Gaon (in Yiddish, "the genius of Vilna"), Rabbi Elijah ben Solomon Zalman (1720–1797). He helped make Vilna (modern-day Vilnius) a world center for Talmudic learning. Chaim Grade (1910–1982) was born in Vilna, the city about which he would write.

The inter-war Republic of Lithuania was home to a large and influential Jewish community whose members either fled the country or were murdered when the Holocaust in Lithuania began in 1941. Prior to World War II, the Lithuanian Jewish population comprised some 160,000 people, or about 7% of the total population. There were over 110 synagogues and 10 yeshivas in Vilnius alone. Census figures from 2005 recorded 4,007 Jews in Lithuania – 0.12 percent of the country's total population.

Vilna (Vilnius) was occupied by Nazi Germany in June 1941. Within a matter of months, this famous Jewish community had been devastated with over two-thirds of its population killed.

Based on data by Institute of Jewish Policy Research, as of 1 January 2016, the core Jewish population of Lithuania is estimated to be 2,700 (0.09% of the wider population), and the enlarged Jewish population was estimated at 6,500 (0.23% of the wider population). The Lithuanian Jewish population is concentrated in the capital, Vilnius, with smaller population centres including Klaipėda and Kaunas.

== Etymology ==
The Yiddish adjective ליטוויש Litvish means "Lithuanian": the noun for a Lithuanian Jew is Litvak. The term Litvak itself originates from Litwak, a Polish term denoting "a man from Lithuania", which however went out of use before the 19th century, having been supplanted in this meaning by Litwin, only to be revived around 1880 in the narrower meaning of "a Lithuanian Jew". The "Lithuania" meant here is the territory of the former Grand Duchy of Lithuania.

Of the main Yiddish dialects in Europe, the Litvishe Yiddish (Lithuanian Yiddish) dialect was spoken by Jews in Lithuania, Belarus, Latvia, Estonia and northeastern Poland, including Suwałki, Łomża, and Białystok.

However, following the dispute between the Hasidim and the Misnagdim, in which the Lithuanian academies were the heartland of opposition to Hasidism, "Lithuanian" came to have the connotation of Misnagdic (non-Hasidic) Judaism generally, and to be used for all Jews who follow the traditions of the great Lithuanian yeshivot, whether or not their ancestors actually came from Lithuania. In modern Israel, Lita'im (Lithuanians) is often used for all Haredi Jews who are not Hasidim (and not Hardalim or Sephardic Haredim). Other expressions used for this purpose are Yeshivishe and Misnagdim. Both the words Litvishe and Lita'im are somewhat misleading, because there are also Hasidic Jews from greater Lithuania and many Litvaks who are not Haredim. The term Misnagdim ("opponents") on the other hand is somewhat outdated, because the opposition between the two groups has lost much of its relevance. Yeshivishe is also problematic because Hasidim now make use of yeshivot as much as the Litvishe Jews.

== Ethnicity, religious customs and heritage ==
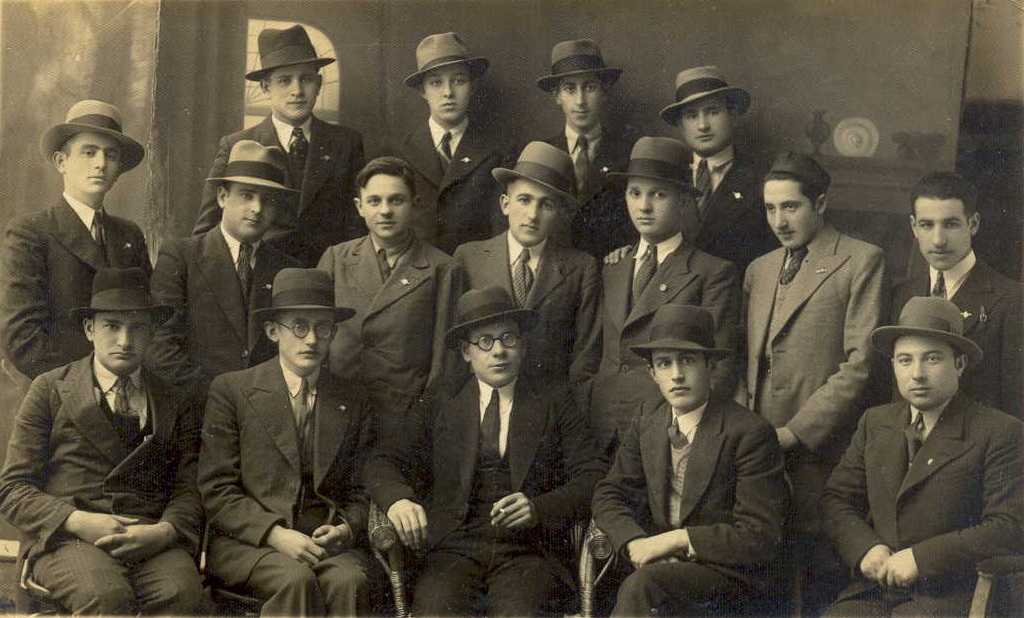
Portrait of Lithuanian yeshiva students

The arrival of Jews from modern day Switzerland, France, Belgium/Netherlands, North-Western Germany and Spain in the Polish-Lithuanian commonwealth is documented as early as the 14th century. The characteristically "Lithuanian" approach to Judaism was marked by a concentration on highly intellectual Talmud study. Lithuania became the heartland of the traditionalist opposition to Hasidism. They named themselves "misnagdim" (opposers) of the Hasidi. The Lithuanian traditionalists believed Hassidim represented a threat to Halachic observance due to certain Kabbalistic beliefs held by the Hassidim, that, if misinterpreted, could lead one to heresy as per the Frankists. Differences between the groups grew to the extent that in popular perception "Lithuanian" and "misnagged" became virtually interchangeable terms. However, a sizable minority of Litvaks belong(ed) to Hasidic groups, including Chabad, Slonim, Karlin-Stolin, Karlin (Pinsk), Lechovitch, Amdur and Koidanov. With the spread of the Enlightenment, many Litvaks became devotees of the Haskala (Jewish Enlightenment) movement in Eastern Europe pressing for better integration into European society, and today, many leading academics, scientists, and philosophers are of Lithuanian Jewish descent.

The most famous Lithuanian institution of Jewish learning was Volozhin yeshiva, which was the model for most later yeshivas. Twentieth century "Lithuanian" yeshivas include Ponevezh, Telshe, Mir, Kelm, and Slabodka, which bear the names of their Lithuanian forebears. American "offspring" of the Lithuanian yeshiva movement include Yeshiva Rabbi Chaim Berlin, Rabbi Isaac Elchanan Theological Seminary, Yeshivas Rabbeinu Yisrael Meir HaKohen ("Chofetz Chaim"), and Beth Medrash Govoha ("Lakewood"), as well as numerous other yeshivas founded by students of Lakewood's founder, Rabbi Aharon Kotler.

In theoretical Talmud study, the leading Lithuanian authorities were Chaim Soloveitchik and the Brisker school; rival approaches were those of the Mir and Telshe yeshivas. In practical halakha, the Lithuanians traditionally followed the Aruch HaShulchan, though today, the "Lithuanian" yeshivas prefer the Mishnah Berurah, which is regarded as both more analytic and more accessible.

In the 19th century, the Orthodox Ashkenazi residents of the Holy Land, broadly speaking, were divided into Hasidim and Perushim, who were Litvaks influenced by the Vilna Gaon. For this reason, in modern-day Israeli Haredi parlance the terms Litvak (noun) or Litvisher (adjective), or in Hebrew Litaim, are often used loosely to include any non-Hasidic Ashkenazi Haredi individual or institution. Another reason for this broadening of the term is the fact that many of the leading Israeli Haredi yeshivas (outside the Hasidic camp) are successor bodies to the famous yeshivot of Lithuania, though their present-day members may or may not be descended from Lithuanian Jewry. In reality, both the ethnic make-up and the religious traditions of the misnagged communities are much more diverse. Customs of Lithuanian non-Hasidic Jews consist of:

1. Wearing of tefillin during non-sabbath days of the intermediate days of the festival chol hamoed.
2. Variations in pronunciation (not practiced by most modern-day Litvaks)
  - The pronunciation of the holam as /ej/ (ei).
  - The shin being pronounced as /s/, making it difficult to differentiate from sin, a phenomenon known as Sabesdiker losn ('Sabbath Lingo').

== History ==
The arrival of Jews from modern day Switzerland, France, Belgium/Netherlands, North-Western Germany and Spain in the Polish-Lithuanian commonwealth is documented as early as the 14th century. In 1388, Jews were granted a charter by Vytautas, under which they formed a class of freemen subject in all criminal cases directly to the jurisdiction of the grand duke and his official representatives, and in petty suits to the jurisdiction of local officials on an equal footing with the lesser nobles (szlachta), boyars, and other free citizens. As a result, the community prospered.

In 1495, they were expelled by Alexander Jagiellon, but allowed to return in 1503. The Lithuanian statute of 1566 placed a number of restrictions on the Jews, and imposed sumptuary laws, including the requirement that they wear distinctive clothing, including yellow caps for men and yellow kerchiefs for women.

The Khmelnytsky Uprising destroyed the existing Lithuanian Jewish institutions. Still, the Jewish population of Lithuania grew from an estimated 120,000 in 1569 to approximately 250,000 in 1792. After the 1793 Second Partition of the Polish–Lithuanian Commonwealth, Litvaks became subjects of the Russian Empire.

=== Litvaks in the Second World War ===
The Jewish Lithuanian population before World War II numbered around 160,000, or about 7% of the total population. At the beginning of the war, some 12,000 Jewish refugees fled into Lithuania from Poland; by 1941 the Jewish population of Lithuania had increased to approximately 250,000, or 10% of the total population.

During the German invasion of June 1941, 141,000 Jews were murdered by the Nazis and Lithuanian collaborators. Notable execution locations were the Paneriai woods (see Ponary massacre) and the Ninth Fort.

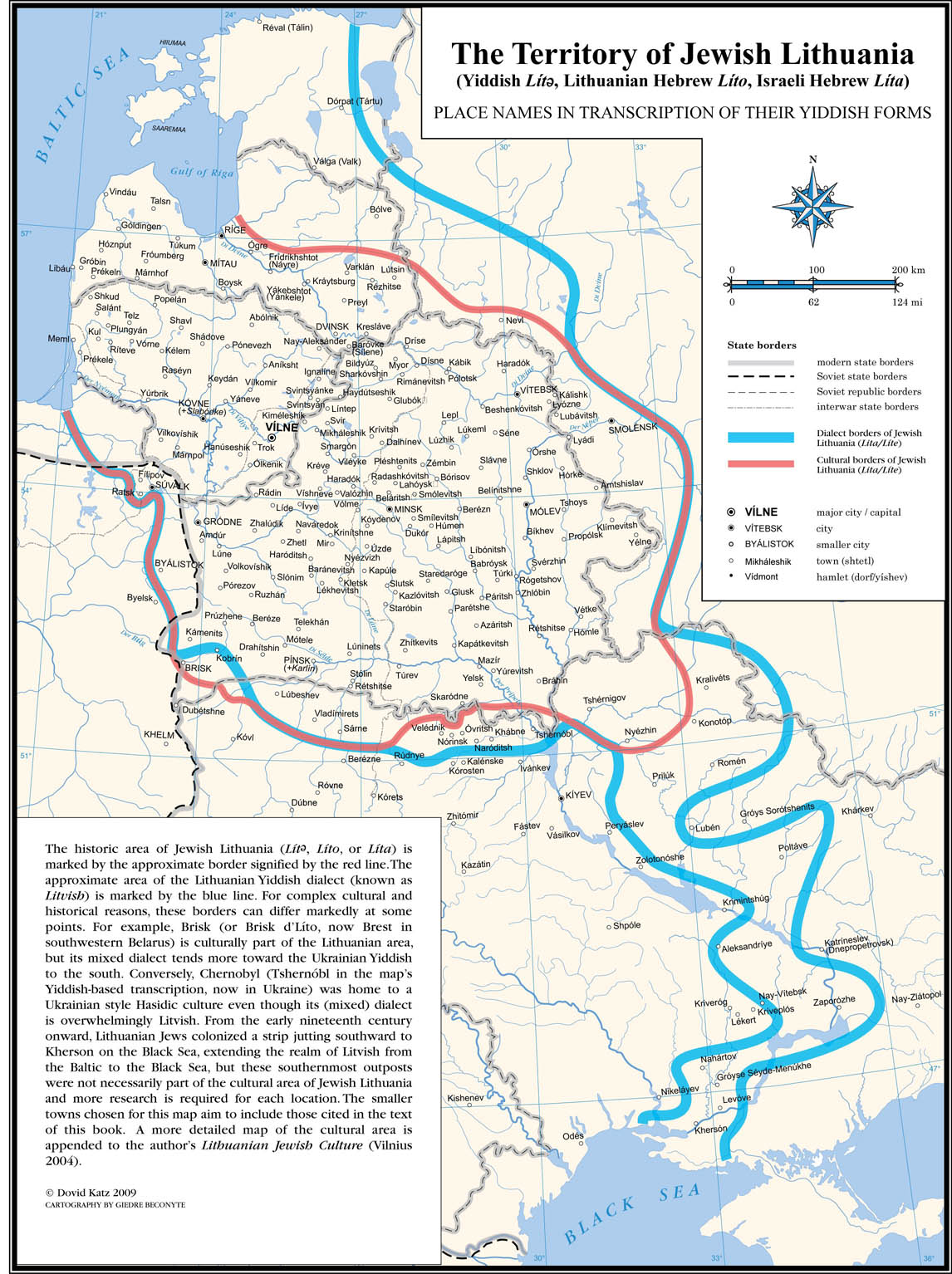
An Atlas of Northeastern Yiddish, by Dovid Katz. Cartography by Giedre Beconyte.

== Culture ==
Litvaks have an identifiable mode of pronouncing Hebrew and Yiddish; this is often used to determine the boundaries of Lita (area of settlement of Litvaks). Its most characteristic feature is the pronunciation of the vowel holam as [ej] (as against Sephardic [oː], Germanic [au] and Polish [oj]).

In the popular perception, Litvaks were considered to be more intellectual and stoic than their rivals, the Galitzianers, who thought of them as cold fish. They, in turn, disdained Galitzianers as irrational and uneducated. Ira Steingroot's "Yiddish Knowledge Cards" devote a card to this "Ashkenazi version of the Hatfields and McCoys". This difference is of course connected with the Hasidic/misnaged debate, Hasidism being considered the more emotional and spontaneous form of religious expression. The two groups differed not only in their attitudes and their pronunciation, but also in their cuisine. The Galitzianers were known for rich, heavily sweetened dishes in contrast to the plainer, more savory Litvisher versions, with the boundary known as the Gefilte Fish Line.

== Genetics ==
The Lithuanian Jewish population may exhibit a genetic founder effect. The utility of these variations has been the subject of debate. One variation, which is implicated in familial hypercholesterolemia, has been dated to the 14th century, corresponding to the establishment of settlements in response to the invitation extended by Gediminas in 1323, which encouraged German Jews to settle in the newly established city of Vilnius. A relatively high rate of early-onset dystonia in the population has also been identified as possibly stemming from the founder effect.

== See also ==
- Category:People of Lithuanian-Jewish descent
- Jewish cemeteries of Vilnius
- Vilna Ghetto
- History of the Jews in Lithuania
- History of the Jews in Latvia
- Timeline of Jewish history in Lithuania and Belarus
- History of the Jews in Poland
- Israel–Lithuania relations
- List of Lithuanian Jews
- Minhag Polin
