= Koidanov (Hasidic dynasty) =

Belarusian Hasidic dynasty

Koidanov (Yiddish: קאידנאוו) is a Hasidic dynasty originating from the city of Dzyarzhynsk (Koidanov), Belarus, where it was founded by Rabbi Shlomo Chaim Perlow (1797–1862) in 1833. Koidanov is a branch of both Lechovitch Hasidism and Karlin-Stolin Hasidism as Rabbi Shlomo Chaim Perlow was the paternal grandson of Rabbi Mordechai of Lechovitch and the maternal grandson of Rabbi Asher of Stolin. Koidanov was the smallest of the three Lithuanian Hasidic dynasties (Slonim and Karlin-Stolin), with most of its Hasidim being murdered in the Holocaust. The dynasty was re-established after the war in Tel Aviv, then moved to Bnei Brak, where the majority of the dynasty is located, but there are Chassidim located around the world.

== History ==
Rabbi Shlomo Chaim was the son of Rabbi Aharon Jaffe of Lechovitch who died when Reb Shlomo Chaim was a young child. After which he was raised by both his grandparents, his father's father, Rabbi Mordechai Jaffe (ca. 1742–1810, founder of Lechovitch Hasidism and his mother's father, Rabbi Asher Perlow (1759–1826), the third Karlin-Stolin Rebbe and son of Rabbi Aharon Perlow HaGadol of Karlin (1736–1772), whose surname he adopted. Reb Shlomo Chaim was married at the young age of thirteen, and his paternal grandfather, Reb Mordechai died on the way to the wedding in Stolin. Following this, Reb Shlomo Chaim learnt under his grandfather, Reb Asher for many years, later learning under the rebbes of Mezhibuz, Apta, Chernobyl, Ruzhin and Zlotshov. Reb Shlomo Chaim's main teacher however was his uncle, Rabbi Noach Jaffe (d. 1832), the 2nd Lechovitcher Rebbe, after whose death, many Lechovitcher Hasidim accepted, Reb Shlomo Chaim as Reb Noach's successor. That following year, Reb Shlomo Chaim established a Hasidic court in the city of Koidanov and soon began to attract thousands of followers. Reb Shlomo Chaim was known for his tolerance of all Jews, even Misngadim, many of whom later become his Hasidim after witnessing his kindness and Torah knowledge. Reb Shlomo Chaim embraced the simpler folk and aroused in them the desire to study and worship in joy. He was relatively against asceticism and personally spent many hours learning Gemara and Shulchan Aruch.

After his death, Reb Shlomo Chaim was succeeded by his son, Rabbi Baruch Mordechai Perlow (1818–1870), who was the Koidanover Rebbe for only eight years until his death in 1870. Reb Boruch Mordechai is described in many accounts and a cold and reserved rebbe entirely dedicated to his own chassidus. He was against the idea of miracle workers and believed that as long as one follows Halakha carefully they will always be healthy and successful. Reb Baruch Mordechai is ultimately best known for establishing a Koidanover kollel in Tiberias which became a staple of the old Yishuv. Reb Baruch Mordechai's was succeeded by his eldest son, Rabbi Aharon Perlow (1839–1897), who was among the most influential rebbes of Koidanover Hasidism. Reb Baruch Mordechai younger son was Rabbi Shalom Perlow (1850–1925) who headed the Koidanover community in Lida. A Koidanover synagogue, Beth Midrash and Yeshiva, were established in 1833, by Rabbi Benjamin of Lida (d. 1862) who was one of the main disciples of the first Koidanover Rebbe (Reb Shlomo Chaim). Reb Shalom became a rebbe of Brzezany, finally becoming the rebbe of Brahin. In 1895, Reb Shalom wrote Ateret Shalom, a commentary on the liturgical poem "Lord I Yearn for the Sabbath's Delight" by Reb Aaron Perlow of Karlin. In 1912 he wrote and published Meshmeret Shalom and is the author of Devrei Shalom as well.

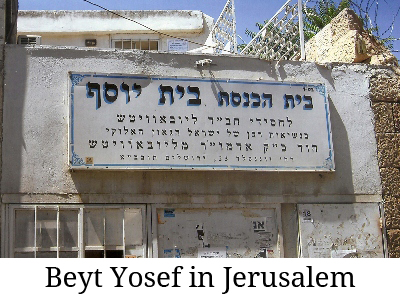

Reb Aharon Perlow (1839–1897) greatly expanded the influence of Koidanover Hasidism. He established several Koidanover communities across Lithuania and Belarus and attracted thousands of followers due to his charismatic leadership. He strengthened the Koidanover community founded in Tiberias, and supported settlement in the Land of Israel but spoke strongly against the tenets of political Zionism. He published and annotated a number of classic kabbalah works, including Rabbi Moshe Cordovero's Or Ne'erav, to which he appended his commentary Nir'eh Or (1899), and Rabbi Moshe Hagiz' Sefat Emet, which he supplemented with teachings on the significance of the Land of Israel in kabbalistic and Hasidic works (1876). He also authored a siddur entitled Seder Tefilot Yisrael Or Hayashar ("The Direct Light: Order of Prayers of Israel"), in which he enumerated "eight mystical practices for spiritual perfection". This siddur is still used by Koidanover Hasidim today.

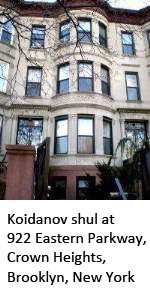

Reb Aharon was succeeded by his son, Rabbi Yosef Perlow (1854–1915) who was said to have been very different than the other Koidanover Rebbes. Following the rise of the Haskalah, Koidanov became a centre of enlightenment which directly challenged the city's Hasidic institutions. To combat this, Reb Yosef built a large yeshiva called Tomchei Tzedek to bring Jews away from the Haskalah and towards Orthodoxy. During this time, Reb Yosef's son-in-law Rabbi Moshe Chaim Yehoshua Schneerson-Twersky (1867–1959) established a Koidanover synagogue in Jerusalem in 1908 known as the "Beis Yosef". Reb Moshe Chaim Yehoshua later immigrated to New York, where he established several Koidanover communities. After Reb Yosef's death in 1915, he was succeeded by his thirteen-year-old son Rabbi Yaakov Yitzchak Perlow (1903–1919), who was known to be an Ilui, after his death in 1919, he was succeeded by his uncle, Rabbi Nechemia Perlow (1860–1927), who moved the dynasty to Baronovitch, Poland following World War I. Reb Nechemia was succeeded by his son, Rabbi Shalom Alter Perlow (1906–1941) who was murdered in the Ponary massacre without leaving any children. Following the rise of Nazism in Europe, the Koidanover Hasidism in Baronovitch elected, Rabbi Meshulam Zalman Yosef Zilberfarb (1868–1943), the third Koidanover Rebbe (Reb Aharon Perlow)'s son-in-law to succeeded Reb Shalom Alter. However he was murdered in the Holocaust only three years later, alongside most of the Koidanover Hasidim.

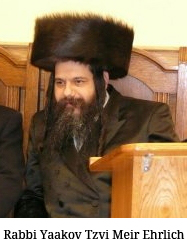

After the Holocaust, Koidanover Hasidism was re-established in Tel Aviv by Rabbi Chanoch Henoch Dov Zilberfarb (1890–1978), who was the son of Reb Meshulam Zalman Yosef Zilberfarb and the Koidanover Rebbe of Botoshan. Reb Chanoch Henoch Dov was succeeded by his son, Reb Aharon Zilberfarb (d. 1994), and then by his grandson, the present Koidanover Rebbe, Rabbi Yaakov Tzvi Meir Ehrlich. Under Rabbi Yaakov Tzvi Meir Ehrlich's direction, the Koidanover dynasty maintains synagogues in Tel Aviv and Bnei Brak and a yeshiva, in addition to chesed projects. The Rebbe is heavily involved in kiruv (outreach). His beis medrash, is located in Dizengoff Square and serves as an outreach center where weekly lectures and a Friday-night Oneg Shabbat attract many secular Jews and guide them towards religious observance. Reb Yaakov Tzvi Meir is well known as an inspiring speaker and educator of youth.

== Koidanover Literature ==
Machon Siach Avos, the Koidanov publishing house in Israel, has reprinted all the works of the Koidanover Rebbes and well as other members of the dynasty. These include:

- Seder Tefilot Yisrael Or Hayashar, the Koidanov siddur, written by Rabbi Aharon Perlow with an introduction by his son, Rabbi Yosef Perlow.
- Haggadah shel Pesaḥ Siaḥ Avot, a commentary on the Passover Haggadah by Rabbi Aharon Perlow,
- Zekher Tzadik (1905), by Rabbi Aharon Perlow
- Divrei Shalom (1882), an anthology of teachings of the Rebbes of Koidanov, plus genealogies, by Rabbi Shalom Perlow
- Mishmeres Shalom, an exploration of the sources of minhagim (customs) in halakha by Rabbi Shalom Perlow.

== Lineage ==
- Grand Rabbi Mordechai Jaffe (ca. 1742–1810), 1st Lechovitcher Rebbe
  - Grand Rabbi Aharon Jaffe of Lechovitch (d. 1807) - Son-in-law of Grand Rabbi Asher Perlow of Karlin-Stolin (son of Grand Rabbi Aharon Perlow HaGadol of Karlin)
    - Grand Rabbi Shlomo Chaim Perlow (1797–1862), 1st Koidanover Rebbe - Adopted his mother's maiden name.
      - Grand Rabbi Baruch Mordecai Perlow (1818–1870), 2nd Koidanover Rebbe
        - Grand Rabbi Aaron Perlow (1839–1897), 3rd Koidanover Rebbe
          - Grand Rabbi Joseph Perlow (1853–1915), 4th Koidanover Rebbe
            - Grand Rabbi Yaakov Yitzchak Perlow (1903–1919), 5th Koidanover Rebbe
            - Rabbi Chaim Moshe Yehoshua Twersky-Schneerson (1867–1959) of Tomashpol and New York - Son-in-law of Reb Yaakov Yitzchak
              - Rabbi Levi Yitzchak Schneersohn-Twersky
            - Rabbi Abraham David Mordechai Perlow (1914–1981)
          - Grand Rabbi Nehemiah Perlow (1860–1927), 6th Koidanover Rebbe of Baronovitch
            - Grand Rabbi Shalom Alter Perlow (1904–1940), 7th Koidanover Rebbe of Baronovitch
          - Grand Rabbi Meshullam Zalman Joseph Zilberfarb (1870–1944), 8th Koidanover Rebbe of Baronovitch - son-in-law of R. Aaron
            - Grand Rabbi Chanoch Henoch Dov Zilberfarb (1890–1978), 9th Koidanover Rebbe of Tel Aviv
              - Grand Rabbi Aharon Zilberfarb (died 1994), 10th Koidanover Rebbe of Tel Aviv
              - Rabbi Yechiel Michael Ehrlich - Son-in-law of Reb Chanoch Henoch Dov
                - Grand Rabbi Yaakov Tzvi Meir Ehrlich, 11th Koidanover Rebbe of Tel Aviv - Grandson of R. Chanoch Henoch
          - Grand Rabbi Dov Moshe Perlow (d. 1900), Koidanover Rebbe of Minsk
        - Grand Rabbi Shalom Perlow (1850–1925), Koidanover Rebbe of Lida and Bragin.
          - Grand Rabbi Shlomo Chaim Perlow, Koidanover Rebbe of Bragin.
        - Grand Rabbi Noach Malovitzky (d. 1920), 5th Lechovitcher Rebbe - Son-in-law of Reb Baruch Mordecai
      - Rabbi Shimon Katzenellenbogen of Zawichost - Son-in-law of Reb Shlomo Chaim.
        - Grand Rabbi Yaakov Perlow (1843–1902), 1st Novominsker Rebbe (adopted his mother's maiden name).
          - Grand Rabbi Alter Yisroel Shimon Perlow (1874–1933), 2nd Novominsker Rebbe
            - Grand Rabbi Nachum Mordechai Perlow (1896–1976), 3rd Novominsker Rebbe - Son-in-law of Grand Rabbi Yitzchak Zelig Morgenstern. 4th Kotzker Rebbe
              - Grand Rabbi Yaakov Perlow (1930–2020), 4th Novominsker Rebbe
                - Grand Rabbi Yehoshua Perlow, Novominsker Rebbe of Brooklyn
                - Grand Rabbi Alter Yisroel Shimon Perlow, Novominsker Rebbe of Lakewood

== See also ==
- Ashkenazi Jews
- List of Hasidic dynasties
