= Lechovitch (Hasidic dynasty) =

Belarusian Hasidic dynasty

Lechovitch (Yiddish: לעכוויטש) is a Lithuanian Hasidic dynasty, originating from the city of Lyakhavichy, Belarus, where it was founded by Rabbi Mordechai Jaffe (ca. 1742 - 1810). Lechovitch is a branch of Karlin Hasidism as Jaffe was a leading disciple of Rabbi Shlomo of Karlin. The Slonim, Koidanov, and Kobrin dynasties derive from Lechovitch Hasidism.

== History ==
Lechovitch Hasidism was founded in 1772 by Mordechai Jaffe, a disciple of Aharon Perlow of Karlin and Shlomo HaLevi of Karlin. After Shlomo HaLevi's death in 1792, Jaffe succeeded him as rebbe. Following Jaffe's death in 1810 he was succeeded by his son, Noach Jaffe [he], who was the Lechovitcher rebbe until his death in 1832 after which the community split between the followers of his son-in-law Mordechai Malovitzky and his nephew and student Shlomo Chaim Perlow, who founded the Koidanov Hasidic dynasty. The last Lechovitcher rebbe was Yochanan Malovitzky who was murdered in the Holocaust. His uncle, Pinchas Betzalel was the son-in-law of the Slonimer rebbe, Shmuel Weinberg, and established a branch of Lechovitch Hasidism in the United States and was succeeded by his grandson, Yehoshua Malovitzky (1923 - 1987).

== Lineage ==
- Grand Rabbi Mordechai Jaffe (ca. 1742 - 1810), 1st Lechovitcher Rebbe
  - Grand Rabbi Noach Jaffe (1775 - 1832), 2nd Lechovitcher Rebbe
    - Grand Rabbi Mordechai Malovitzky (maternal grandson of R. Shlomo HaLevi of Karlin), 3rd Lechovitcher Rebbe - son-in-law of R. Noach.
      - Grand Rabbi Aharon Malovitzky (died 1851), fourth Lechovitcher Rebbe - grandson-in-law of R. Zev Wolf of Zhitomyr
        - Grand Rabbi Noach Malovitzky (died 1920), fifth Lechovitcher Rebbe
          - Grand Rabbi Yochanan Malovitzky (1902 - 1942), sixth Lechovitcher Rebbe
        - Grand Rabbi Pinchas Betzalel Malovitzky (1870 - 1948), Slonim-Lechovitcher Rebbe - son-in-law of Grand Rabbi Shmuel Weinberg of Slonim
          - Rabbi Avraham Aaron Malovitzky (1890 - 1942)
            - Grand Rabbi Yehoshua Malovitzky (1923 - 1987), Slonim-Lechovitcher Rebbe - son-in-law of Grand Rabbi Yaakov Halberstam, Tshakover Rebbe
              - Rabbi Shlomo Pinchas Malovitzky (b. 1949), Av Beis Din of Slonim-Monsey.
              - Rabbi Chaim Malovicki of Williamsburg (b. 1951)
- Rabbi Aharon Jaffe of Lechovitch (d. 1807) - Son-in-law of Grand Rabbi Asher Perlow of Karlin-Stolin
  - Grand Rabbi Solomon Haim Perlow, 1st Koidanover Rebbe - Adopted his mother's maiden name.
    - Grand Rabbi Baruch Mordecai Perlow (1818 - 1870), 2nd Koidanover Rebbe
      - Grand Rabbi Aaron Perlow (1839 - 1897), 3rd Koidanover Rebbe
        - Grand Rabbi Joseph Perlow (1853 - 1915), 4th Koidanover Rebbe
          - Grand Rabbi Yaakov Yitzchak Perlow (1903 - 1919), 5th Koidanover Rebbe
        - Grand Rabbi Nehemiah Perlow (1860 - 1927), 6th Koidanover Rebbe
          - Grand Rabbi Shalom Alter Perlow (1904 - 1940), 7th Koidanover Rebbe
        - Grand Rabbi Meshullam Zalman Joseph Zilberfarb (1870 - 1944), 8th Koidanover Rebbe - son-in-law of R. Aaron
          - Grand Rabbi Chanoch Henoch Dov Zilberfarb (1890-1978), 9th Koidanover Rebbe of Tel Aviv
            - Grand Rabbi Aharon Zilberfarb (d. 1994), 10th Koidanover Rebbe
              - Grand Rabbi Yaakov Tzvi Meir Ehrlich, 11th Koidanover Rebbe - Grandson of R. Chanoch Henoch
- Grand Rabbi Moshe Aaron Levin (1780 - 1846), Amdurer Rebbe - son-in-law of R. Mordechai
  - Grand Rabbi Boruch Chaim Levin (1804 - 1867) - son-in-law of Grand Rabbi Moshe Polier of Kobrin.

== See also ==
- Jaffe family
- Koidanov Hasidic dynasty
