= Elijah Schik =

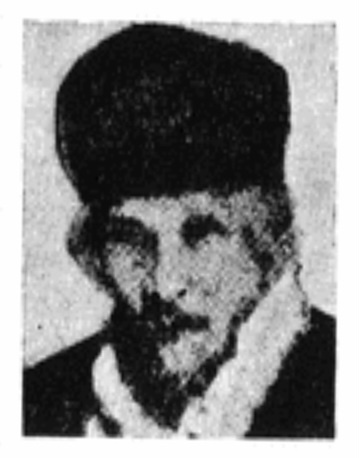

Elijah Schik (1795 – September 2, 1876) also known as Reb Alinkah or the Ayn Eliyah was a 19th-century Misngadic Lithuanian rabbi.

== Biography ==
Reb Alinkah was born in the town of Vasilishki, Belarus around 1795. His father R. Benjamin was a prominent rabbi and a descendant of R. Hanoch Heinich Schick of Shklov. The Hungarian rabbi R. Moshe Schick was a cousin of Reb Alinkah. Reb Alinkah was orphaned at only three months old after his father was killed in a pogrom. He was a pupil of Benjamin, chief rabbi of Grodno. As rabbi he officiated in Lida, where he ultimately became engrossed in a controversy with the city's Hasidic rabbi, R. Benjamin of Lida in 1854, later relocating to Kobrin. On the holy days of Rosh ha-Shanah and Yom Kippur he acted as cantor. He was one of the preachers whose sermons always attracted large audiences. Schick was the author of "'Ayn Eliyahu," a commentary on Jacob Ḥabib's "'En Ya'aḳob," published with the Vina edition of that work.
