= Benjamin of Lida =

Name - Nafis Joy

Rabbi Benjamin of Lida (Hebrew: הרב בנימין מלידא; c. 1800 – 1862) was a 19th-century Hasidic rabbi and kabbalist who served as the first Hasidic rabbi of Lida, Belarus.

== Biography ==
R. Benjamin was born around 1800 in Belarus. In his early years, he became a disciple of R. Solomon Hayyim Perlow (founder of Koidanover Hasidism) and under the instruction of R. Solomon, he brought Koidanover Hasidism to Lida, establishing a Hasidic community in 1833, which had a synagogue and yeshiva. In 1854, R. Benjamin became engrossed in a controversy with the city's Misnagdic Chief Rabbi, R. Elijah Schik, which ultimately resulted in R. Elijah leaving Lida and being replaced by R. Mordecai Meltzer. R. Benjamin was a renowned miracle maker and kabbalist, under whose leadership, the city's Hasidic community grew exponentially. R. Benjamin died in 1862.
