= Sholom Noach Berezovsky =

Jewish religious leader, author

Rabbi Sholom Noach Berezovsky
- שלום נח ברזובסקי
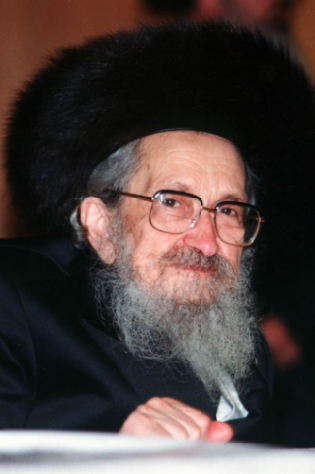

Personal life
- Born: August 18, 1911 Baranavichy, Russian Empire
- Died: August 8, 2000 (aged 88)
- Buried: Mount of Olives
- Parents: Rabbi Moshe Avraham Berezovsky (father); Tzvia Berezovsky (née Waisshtein) (mother)
- Dynasty: Slonim

Religious life
- Religion: Judaism
- Denomination: Hasidism

Jewish leader
- Began: 1981
- Ended: 2000
- Dynasty: Slonim

Sholom Noach Berezovsky (Hebrew: שלום נח ברזובסקי; August 18, 1911 – August 8, 2000) was the rebbe (hereditary rabbinic leader) of the Slonim dynasty of hasidim from 1981 until his death. His teachings were published as a series of books entitled Nesivos Sholom.

== Early life ==
Berezovsky was born on August 18, 1911 (4 Av 5671 in the Hebrew calendar) in Baranavichy (today in Belarus), to Rabbi Moshe Avrohom Berezovsky and Tzvia Berezovsky. His father was the head of the local Jewish community and his mother was a granddaughter of Hillel Weinberg, a brother of the first Slonimer rebbe Rabbi Avraham Weinberg.

Berezovsky studied in the Slonimer yeshiva Toras Chessed in Baranovitsh, which combined the Lithuanian Talmudic style of the non-Hasidic yeshivas with the Hasidic approach. Starting in about 1930, the Slonimer rebbe Avraham Weinberg had him write notes on the discourses which Weinberg delivered every Shabbos (sabbath). These notes were subsequently published under the name Beis Avrohom.

By 1933 he had moved to Israel and in that year married a daughter of Rabbi Avrohom Weinberg of Tiberias (who would later become Slonimer Rebbe).

== Rabbinic career ==
In 1940 he was appointed rosh yeshiva of Achei Temimim, the Lubavitcher yeshiva in Tel Aviv. In 1941 he opened the Slonimer yeshiva in Jerusalem with five students.

In 1954, Berezovsky's father-in-law became the Slonimer rebbe (hereditary dynastic leader).

He succeeded his father-in-law as rebbe on the latter's death in 1981. He was succeeded by his son Shmuel.

== Works ==
Rabbi Berezovsky is best known for his seven-volume Nesivos Sholom (נתיבות שלום, "Paths of Peace"; see Hebrew article), a work which enjoys enormous popularity across the Orthodox world. It is described as "a mix of passionate and inspiring Chassidus, and Mussar that speaks directly to the individual", providing a "roadmap that leads inevitably to a higher place for the person seeking it". It is arranged around the Weekly Torah portion and the special days of the year. It was published in 1982.

Rabbi Berezovsky also published the works of other Slonimer rebbes. The Slonim Hasidic dynasty was almost wiped out in the Holocaust, and Berezovsky collected the oral traditions ascribed to previous Slonimer rebbes (who did not commit their teachings to writing) in works such as Divrei Shmuel and Toras Ovos. He also wrote up his father-in-law's discourses which were subsequently published as Birkas Avrohom.

Finally, he also wrote books of his own teachings, including several smaller works on educational issues, marital harmony and other issues.

== Sources ==
- Hamodia, August 18, 2000, p. 24 and Marbitzei Torah Me'olam Ha'chasidut Vol. I, p. 177 and Vol. III, p. 167, quoted in Hama'yan
- Responding to Loss with Leadership: Nesivos Shalom on the Holocaust, Weinberg, Tzipora. August 9,2016
