= Aharon Perlow of Koidanov =

Third Rebbe of the Koidanov Hasidic dynasty

Aharon Perlow (Hebrew: אהרון פרלוב; 1839–1897) was the third Rebbe of the Koidanov Hasidic dynasty. He was a charismatic leader who attracted thousands of followers and effected a revival of the Koidanover dynasty founded by his grandfather, Rabbi Shlomo Chaim Perlow (1797-1862). He authored several important works that became standard texts for Koidanover Hasidim to this day, including a siddur, Seder Tefilot Yisrael Or Hayashar ("The Direct Light: Order of Prayers of Israel").

== Biography ==
Perlow was born in Koidanov (present-day Dzyarzhynsk, Belarus) to Rabbi Baruch Mordechai Perlow (1818–1870), the second Koidanover Rebbe. He was the great-great-grandson of both Rabbi Mordechai of Lyakhavichy (Lechovitch) (c. 1742–1810) and Rabbi Asher Perlow of Karlin. Before acceding to the leadership of the Koidanover Hasidim, he was the Rav of the Koidanover shtiebel in Lechovitch. He pioneered the opening of prayer houses in different towns that followed the teachings of the Rebbes of Lechovitch, Kobryn, Slonim, and Koidanov. He became the third Koidanover Rebbe upon the death of his father in 1870.

The new rebbe's charismatic personality and scholarship attracted thousands of Hasidim to Koidanov. He built synagogues in many other towns to spread Koidanover influence, and strengthened the Koidanover community founded in Tiberias, Palestine, by his grandfather. While he supported settlement in the Land of Israel, he spoke strongly against the tenets of Zionism. He reportedly told his Hasidim: "Whoever gives money to Hovevei Zion [a forerunner of Zionism which encouraged Jewish immigration to Palestine] forfeits his reward in the world to come, despite all the charitable deeds that he may have performed and may yet perform throughout his life".

In his writings and demeanor, Rebbe Aharon embodied the "mystical-charismatic style" of the Rebbes of Karlin-Stolin, of which Koidanov is a branch. A scholar of Kabbalah, he published and annotated a number of classic kabbalah works, including Rabbi Moshe Cordovero's Or Ne'erav, to which he appended his commentary Nir'eh Or (1899), and Rabbi Moshe Hagiz' Sefat Emet, which he supplemented with teachings on the significance of the Land of Israel in kabbalistic and Hasidic works (1876). He also authored a siddur entitled Seder Tefilot Yisrael Or Hayashar ("The Direct Light: Order of Prayers of Israel"), in which he enumerated "eight mystical practices for spiritual perfection". This siddur is still used by Koidanover Hasidim today. Other works, including Haggadah shel Pesach Siach Avot (1991) and Zekher Tzadik (1905), were published posthumously. His brother, Rabbi Shalom of Koidanov-Bruhin (1850–1925), was also a prolific writer whose works expanded the literature and teachings of Koidanov.

The present-day Koidanover Rebbe, Rabbi Yaakov Tzvi Meir Ehrlich, is the great-grandson of the son-in-law of Rebbe Aharon.
