= Uri of Strelisk =

18th/19th-century Hasidic Rabbi

Rabbi Uri Klughaft of Strelisk
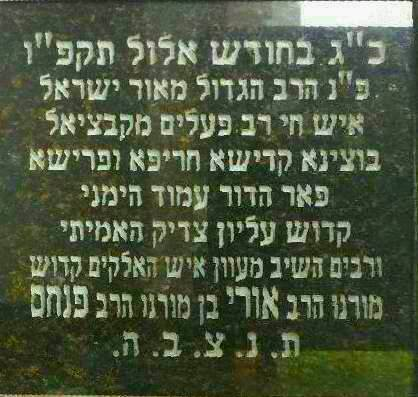
- Epitaph on the Rabbi's grave

Personal life
- Born: 1757 Janow, Polish–Lithuanian Commonwealth
- Died: 7 September 1826 (aged 68–69) Strelisk, Volhynia, Russian Empire
- Spouse: Beloma Koppel Chassid
- Dynasty: Strelisk

Religious life
- Religion: Judaism

Jewish leader
- Successor: Rabbi Shlomo Klughaft
- Dynasty: Strelisk

Rabbi Uri Klughaft of Strelisk (Hebrew: רבי אורי קלוגהויפט מסְטְרֶלִיסְק) (nicknamed HaSharaf "the burning Angel"; 1757 – 7 September 1826) was a Hasidic Rabbi and member of the Strelisk dynasty notable for his spread of Hasidism in Galicia.

== Biography ==
Klughaft was born in Janów to a poor and old artisan, Pinchas. He had met with the Maggid of Mezeritch who had foretold that his wife would give birth to a son "who will be a light that illuminates the world". By the time he was grown up, Klughaft married a woman named Beloma, the daughter of Rabbi Yaakov Koppel Hager (a student of the Besht) and the sister of Rabbi Menachem Mendel Hager of Kosov.

He would study under Rabbi Elimelech of Lizhensk and Rabbi Shlomo of Karlin, a personal mentor of his. He also took influence from Rabbi Yakov Yosef of Ostrava. In the year 1792, upon the murder of Shlomo of Karlin by Cossack forces, Klughaft began to lead Hasidism in Lviv, and from there he moved to Strelisk under the guidance of Rabbi Aharon Aryeh Leib of Permishlan and The Seer of Lublin.

As his mentor, Shlomo, was known for passionate prayer, it is said that after his murder, Rabbis Asher of Stolin (I) and Mordechai of Liakhovichi traveled to Rabbi Boruch of Medzhybizh, but Klughaft did not join them, as he said he did not see the work of prayer in Baruch.

Klughaft's leadership of his followers followed similar patterns of his childhood, and he did not preach a material life, embracing poverty. He once told Rabbi Yisrael Friedman of Ruzhin, who embraced materialism, that his followers do not want wealth. When Friedman's followers were gathered, they were asked if they wanted to become rich. They unanimously answered no, except for one follower who said that his wife wanted to be rich, and he became one of the governors of Rabbi Friedman's court.

Uri died in Sterlisk on the 23rd of Elul, 5586, and was buried in the town. A collection of his sayings, the Amri Kadush, was published posthumously. His son Rabbi Shlomo filled his role as the Rabbi of Strelisk, however, after Klughaft's death, most of his followers went to Rabbi Yisrael Friedman instead.

== Legacy ==
Poet Uri Zvi Greenberg is one of his descendants, and the Rabbi is mentioned in one of his poems.

The character of Rabbi Klughaft is described in Shmuel Yosef Agnon short story, "The Beginning of the Use of the Sharaf". It was used again by Agnon in creating the character of Rabbi Uriel in the story "The Rejected".

=== Notable students ===
Notable students of Klughaft include the following:

- Rabbi Yehuda Zvi Brandwein (I)
- Rabbi dov berish flam of olesko son of rabbi Shlomo Flam
- Rabbi Sholom Rokeach
- Rabbi Zvi Hirsh of Rymanów
- Rabbi Yehoshua Asher Rabinowitz
- Rabbi Eliezer Ze'ev of Butshetsh
- Rabbi Mordechai Ziskind of Stryj
- Rabbi Yitzchak Isaac of Zidichov
