= Lyakhavichy =

Lyakhavichy Ляхавічы (Belarusian)
- Town
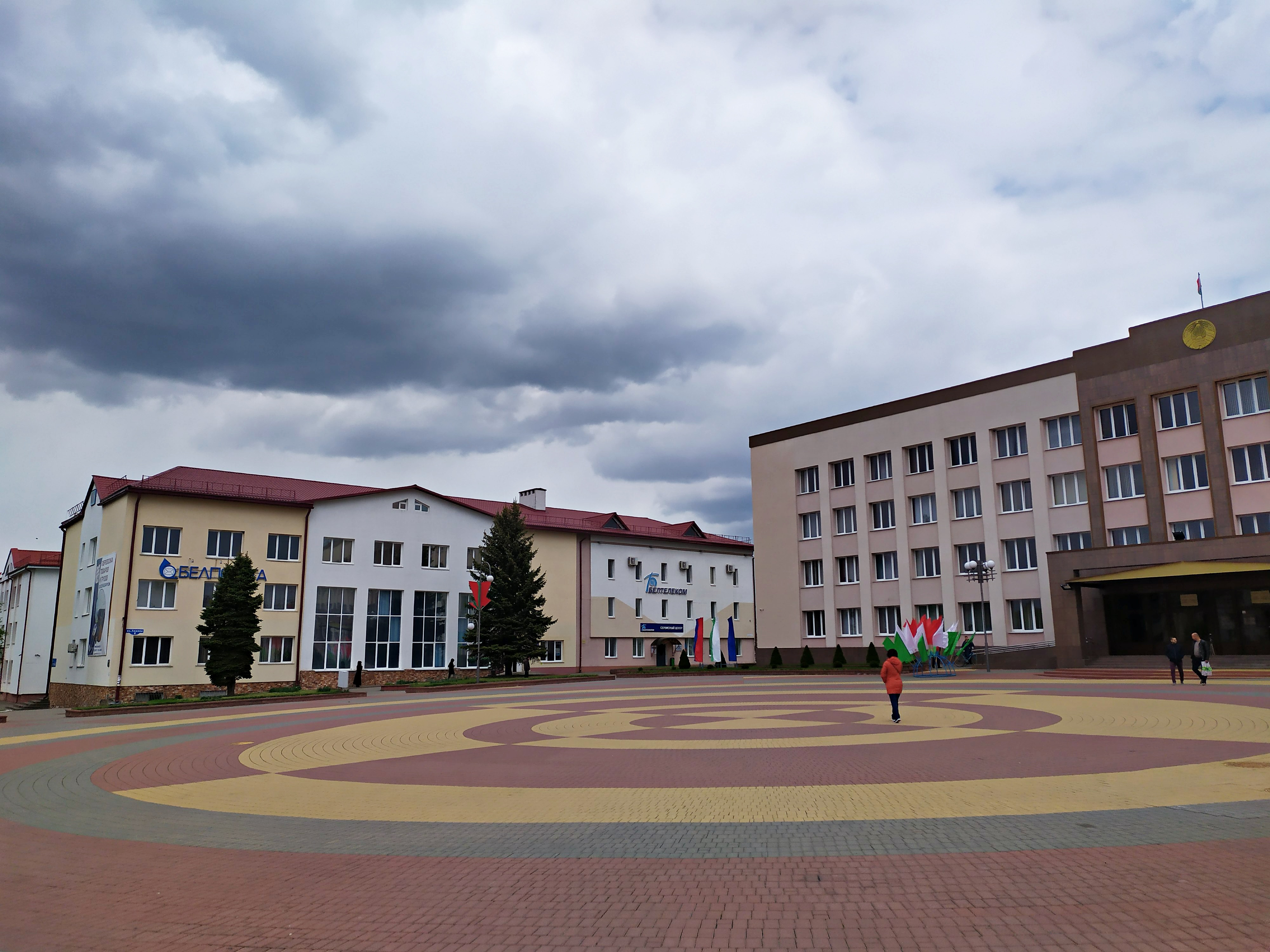

- Coat of arms

- Location within Belarus
- Coordinates: 53°02′N 26°16′E
- Country: Belarus
- Region: Brest Region
- District: Lyakhavichy District
- First mentioned: 1492
- City status: 1931
- Elevation: 180 m (590 ft)

Population (2026)
  - Total: 10,473
- Time zone: UTC+3 (MSK)
- Postal code: 225372
- Area code: (+375) 1633
- Vehicle registration: 1
- Website: liahovichi.brest-region.by

Lyakhavichy, or Lyakhovichi, (Note: Belarusian: Ляхавічы, romanized: Liachavičy, IPA: [ˈlʲaxavʲitʂɨ]; Russian: Ляховичи, romanized: Lyakhovichi; Polish: Lachowicze; Yiddish: לאחוביץ ,לעכאוויטש, romanized: Lakhovits, Lekhavitsh.) is a town in Brest Region, Belarus. It serves as the administrative center of Lyakhavichy District. As of 2026, it has a population of 10,473.

== History ==
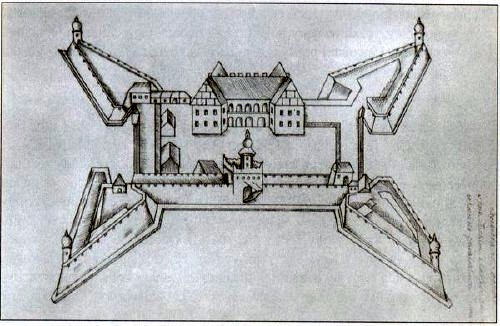
Liahavichy Castle in the 17th century

Known since the 15th century in the Grand Duchy of Lithuania as the center of the volost of the same name. At the beginning of the 16th century, it belonged to Albertas Goštautas. After the death of his son Stanislav in 1542 the town passed to the widow of the latter, Barbara Radziwiłł, who in 1547 married the heir to the Polish throne, bringing to him the numerous possessions of the Goštautas family. On April 10, 1572, Sigismund II Augustus transferred the town to the castellan of Vilna, Jan Hieronimowicz Chodkiewicz. His son, the Grand Hetman of Lithuania Jan Karol Chodkiewicz, built there in place of a small wooden castle a new stone castle of bastion type according to the most modern European models of that time. The castle was repeatedly unsuccessfully besieged by Ukrainian Cossacks and insurgent peasants. In 1635, the castle and the town passed into the possession of Jan Stanisław Sapieha.

During the Russo-Polish War of 1654–1667, troops of A. N. Trubetskoy in 1655 burned the town, but did not dare to besiege the castle. In 1660 the Russian voevod Ivan Andreevich Khovansky was unable to take the fortress.

During the Swedish invasion of Poland in the Great Northern War, in 1706, the castle, defended by the Cossacks, was handed over to the Swedes after a long siege and partially destroyed.

In the years 1655–1760, the famous Belynich Icon of the Mother of God was in Lyakhovichi.

In 1760–1775, the town and the partly destroyed castle belonged to the Bishop of Vilnius Ignatius of Masala, and then by a decision of the diet (sejm) passed into the possession of the Polish-Lithuanian Commonwealth.

Lyakhovichi was part of the Nowogródek County, and from 1791 to the Sloucheretsk County. In the Second Partition of Poland 1793, it was annexed by the Russian Empire. Afterwards it was a township and the center of the volost of Slutsk district. In 1897 the population of Liakhovichi was 5,016.

=== 20th century ===
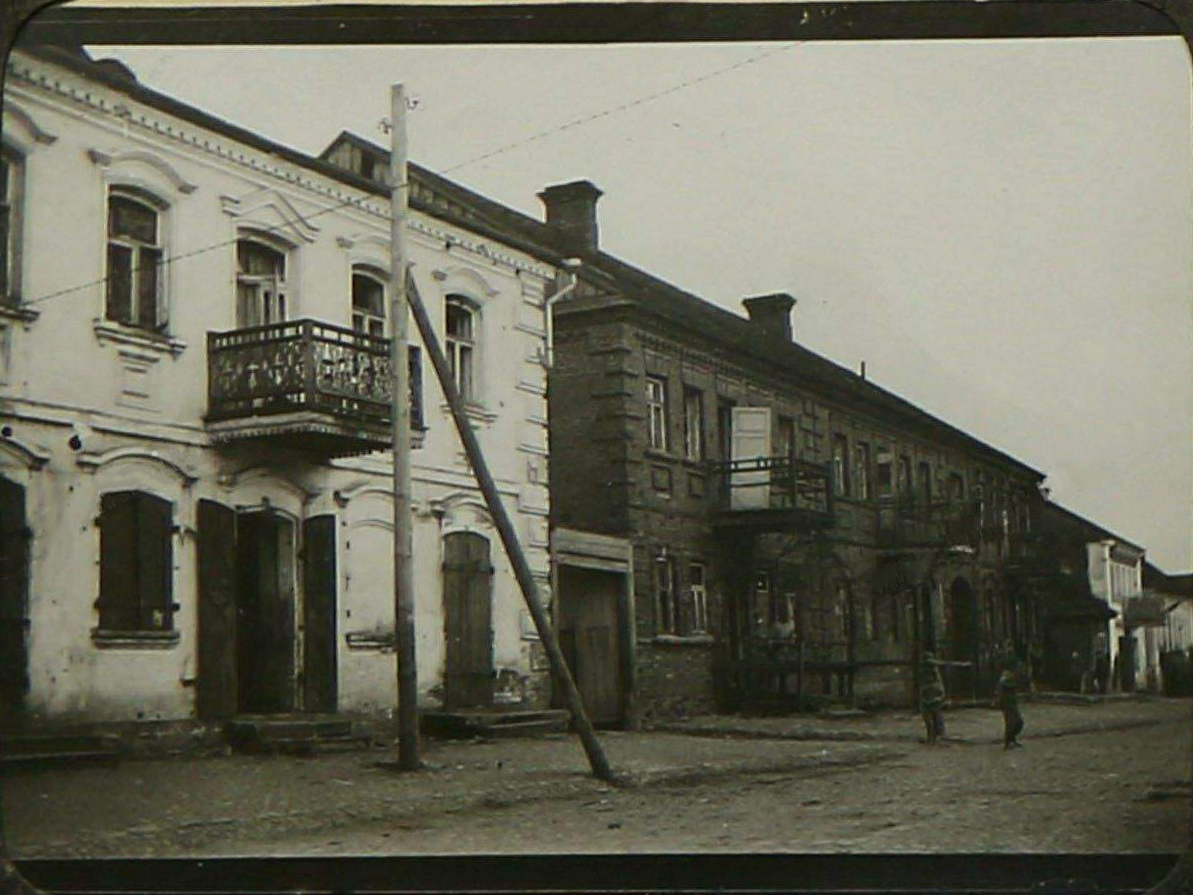
Lachowicze in 1917

During the First World War it was near the front lines. In 1918, occupied by the Germans, in 1919-1920 by the Poles. In the 1921–1939 it was part of Poland, a town in the Baranowicze County in the Nowogródek Voivodeship. According to the 1921 Polish census, the town had a population of 2,819, 50.1% Jewish, 48.1% Polish, 1.5% Belarusian and 0.3% Tatar.

Following the invasion of Poland in September 1939 at the start of World War II, the town was occupied by the Soviet Union and included within the Byelorussian SSR and since January 15, 1940 it was a district center. In 1939 there were 5,100 inhabitants. Lachowicze was under German occupation from 26 June 1941 to 5 July 1944. More than 3,000 Jewish inhabitants lived in the town, swelled by an influx of refugees fleeing from central and western Poland. In November 1941, Jews were gathered in the Lyakhavichy Ghetto set up in the central area of the Jewish quarter, then taken from there and killed in a sandpit near the village of Lotva by an Einsatzgruppe. A new massacre took place in June 1942 when 300 Jews kept prisoners in a ghetto were killed in a place close to the previous one. That day, a revolt in the ghetto took place and several Jews managed to kill the German commander and join the partisans.

== Notable people ==
- Sergiusz Piasecki (1901–1964), Polish writer and soldier
- Rabbi Mordechai Yaffe of Lechovitch (1742–1810), a disciple of R' Aharon of Karlin (I), and his successor, R. Shlomo of Karlin
- Rabbi Noach of Lechovitch (1774–1832), son and successor of R' Mordechai of Lechovitz.
- Nachman Shlomo Greenspan (1878–1961), Rabbi and Talmud scholar
- Will Herberg (1906-1977), Jewish-American intellectual
- Henry Slonimsky (1884–1970), Jewish-American professor
- Jakub Szynkiewicz (1884–1966), first mufti of the newly independent Poland in 1925
- Yosef Tekoah (1925–1991), Israeli diplomat and President of the Ben-Gurion University of the Negev
- Joseph Brody (1877-1937), American Jewish composer and teacher to George Gershwin
- Leon Talmi (1893–1952), Yiddish journalist; executed in Moscow on the Night of the Murdered Poets

== Bibliography ==
- Szulakowska, Urszula (2018). Renaissance and Baroque Art and Culture in the Eastern Polish-Lithuanian Commonwealth (1506-1696). Cambridge Scholar Publishing. pp. 339–343. ISBN 978-1-5275-1135-4.
