= Lyakhavichy district =

District of Brest region, Belarus

Lyakhavichy district Ляхавіцкі раён (Belarusian)
- District
- Coat of arms

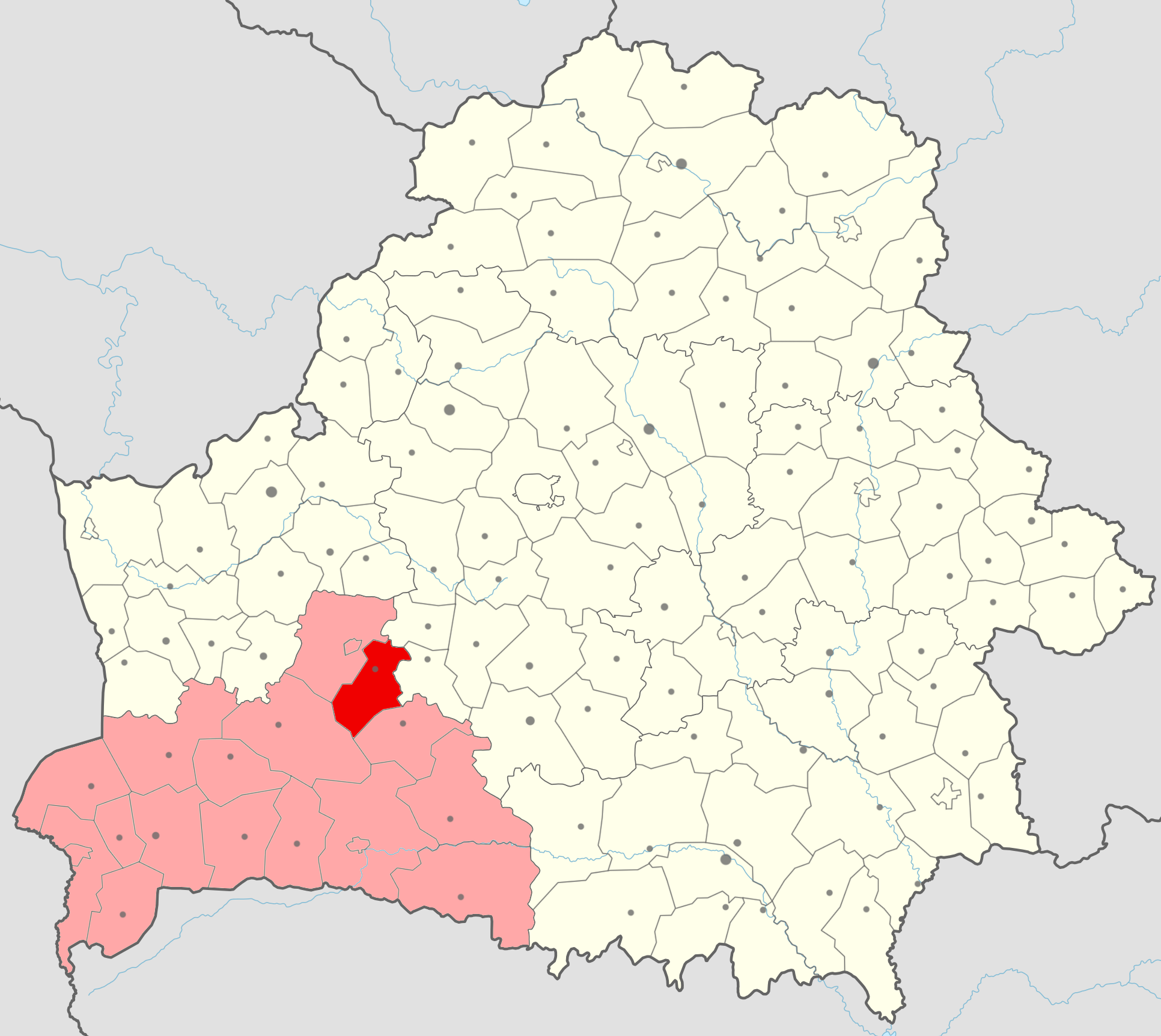
- Coordinates: 53°02′20″N 26°15′59″E
- Country: Belarus
- Region: Brest region
- Formed: 1940
- Administrative center: Lyakhavichy

Area
  - District: 1,352.31 km^{2} (522.13 sq mi)

Population (2024)
  - District: 22,055
  - Density: 16.309/km^{2} (42.240/sq mi)
  - Urban: 10,605
  - Rural: 11,450
- Time zone: UTC+3 (MSK)
- Website: liahovichi.brest-region.gov.by

Lyakhavichy district or Liachavičy district (Belarusian: Ляхавіцкі раён; Russian: Ляховичский район) is a district (raion) of Brest region in Belarus. Its administrative center is Lyakhavichy. As of 2024, it has a population of 22,055.

== Demographics ==
At the time of the 2009 Belarusian census, Lyakhavichy district had a population of 30,498. Of these, 88.4% were of Belarusian, 6.5% Polish, 3.5% Russian and 0.9% Ukrainian ethnicity. 90.5% spoke Belarusian and 8.1% Russian as their native language. In 2023, it had a population of 22,388.

== Notable residents ==
- Tadeusz Reytan (1742, Hrušaǔka estate – 1780), politician
