= Pinsk-Karlin =

Belarusian Hasidic dynasty

Pinsk-Karlin is a Hasidic group that is an offshoot of Karlin-Stolin.

== History ==
A distinguished group of the elders of Karlin did not accept the leadership of the present Karlin-Stoliner Rebbe, who was a baby when his predecessor died. They asked the Lelover Rebbe to be their new rebbe. After the second generation, the Lelover Rebbe did not want to be unnecessarily involved in what he saw as "politics", and withdrew as their rebbe. The Hasidim then appointed Rabbi Aharon Rosenfeld, a Karliner Hasid himself, as their rebbe. To distinguish themselves from the Karlin-Stoliner Hasidim, they call themselves the Pinsk-Karlin.

== Rebbes ==
- Rabbi Moshe Mordechai Biderman of Lelov (1903–1987), who was accepted by many Karliner Hasidim as the new rebbe after the passing of Rabbi Yochanan of Karlin-Stolin.
  - Rabbi Shimon Biderman of Lelov, son of Rabbi Moshe. In 1991, he stepped down from the Karliner leadership, remaining as Lelover Rebbe of Bnei Brak.
    - Rebbe Aharon Hacohen Rosenfeld of Pinsk-Karlin (1927–2001), a descendant of Rebbe Aaron of Karlin, appointed as manhig (leader) of Pinsk-Karlin in 1991, as a successor of Rabbi Shimon of Lelov, who gave up leadership of the Karliner Hasidim after he suffered a stroke.
      - Rebbe Aryeh Rosenfeld of Pinsk-Karlin, present Rebbe of Pinsk-Karlin, son of Rabbi Aharon Rosenfeld, under whose leadership the community has expanded from Jerusalem to Bnei Brak, Beitar Illit, Beit Shemesh, and Upper Modiin.
