= Shlomo of Karlin =

Disciple of the Maggid of Mezeritch and Hasidic rabbi

Rabbi Shlomo of Karlin

Personal life
- Born: 1738 Tulchyn, Poland-Lithuania
- Died: 12 July 1792 (aged 53–54) Ludmir, Poland-Lithuania
- Parent: Meir (father)
- Dynasty: Karlin-Stolin

Religious life
- Religion: Judaism
- Denomination: Hasidic Judaism

Jewish leader
- Predecessor: Aharon of Karlin (I)
- Organisation: Rebbe of Karlin
- Yahrtzeit: 22 Tammuz
- Dynasty: Karlin-Stolin

Rabbi Shlomo of Karlin (Hebrew: רבי שלמה הלוי סג"ל מקרלין, romanized: Rabbi Shlomo Ha'levi Segal miKarlin) (1738 – 12 July 1792) was a disciple of the Maggid of Mezeritch and rabbi Aharon the Great of Karlin. After the death of Aharon, Solomon became the leader of the Hasidic dynasty in Karlin. His descendants served as rabbis of Volhynian Hasidism.

== Biography ==
Shlomo was born to rabbi Meir in 1738 in Tulchyn. He was a disciple of the Maggid of Mezeritch, Dov Ber ben Avraham and Aharon of Karlin. After Aharon's death in 1772, he became a leader of Hasidic Jewry in the region of Karlin where he succeeded Aharon in the role of Rebbe. He is well known mostly for his enthusiasm for prayer and supernatural miracles and his great influence in the area of modern-day Lithuania, as well as being a co-founder of Lechovitch Judaism.

Many stories were told of Shlomo healing people with prayer and his "holy hands", including one story of him removing burns of someone who had boiling water poured on him in a Mikveh. Menachem Mendel Schneersohn wrote:

I heard that the Rebbe (referring to his grandfather Shneur Zalman of Liadi) said his soul is Eden upon the tzaddik, rabbi Shlomo Karliner, his soul is Eden, and that the world is resounding with him and his miracles, and said that he is only a bit higher than the earth, that by being only a bit higher than the earth, he can perform miracles.

After the death of Avraham HaMalach, Shlomo raised his sons, Sholom Shachne and Israel Chaim of Ludmir, the latter of which would marry his daughter.

Shlomo spent his final years in Volynia and Galicia after he was expelled from Kalin in 1786 by opponents of the Hasidic movement. He was shot in Ludmir, Ukraine, by a Cossack named Armilos during the conflict between Russia and Poland, preceding its partition. He died of his wounds on the 22 Tammuz 5552 (12 July 1792). The Tzadiks of Hasidism saw him as the "Messiah ben Joseph" who was martyred for the sanctification of God. His followers practice Yom Hillula every year on the anniversary of his death under the Hebrew calendar.

Many prominent Hasidic rabbis are descended from Shlomo, including some on the Baal Shem Tov's family tree, such as rabbi Dov Ber of Chvastov, who was also a descendant of the Maggid.

== Notable students ==
Notable students of his include:

- Rabbi Mordechai of Lechovitch
- Rabbi Asher of Stolin (I), who grew up with him after he was orphaned
- Rabbi Uri of Strelisk
