= Letters of Gediminas =

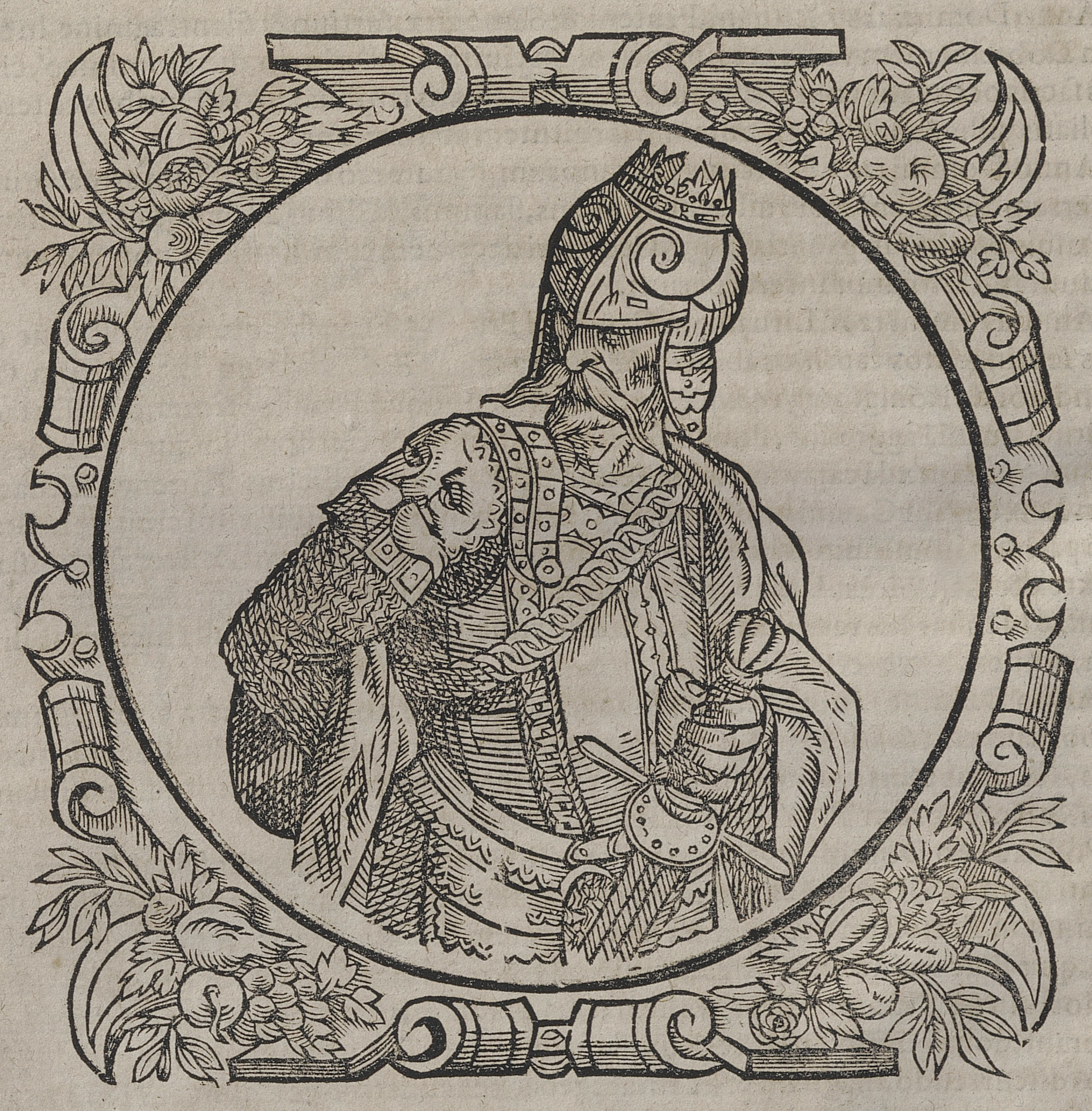
Gediminas, Grand Duke of Lithuania

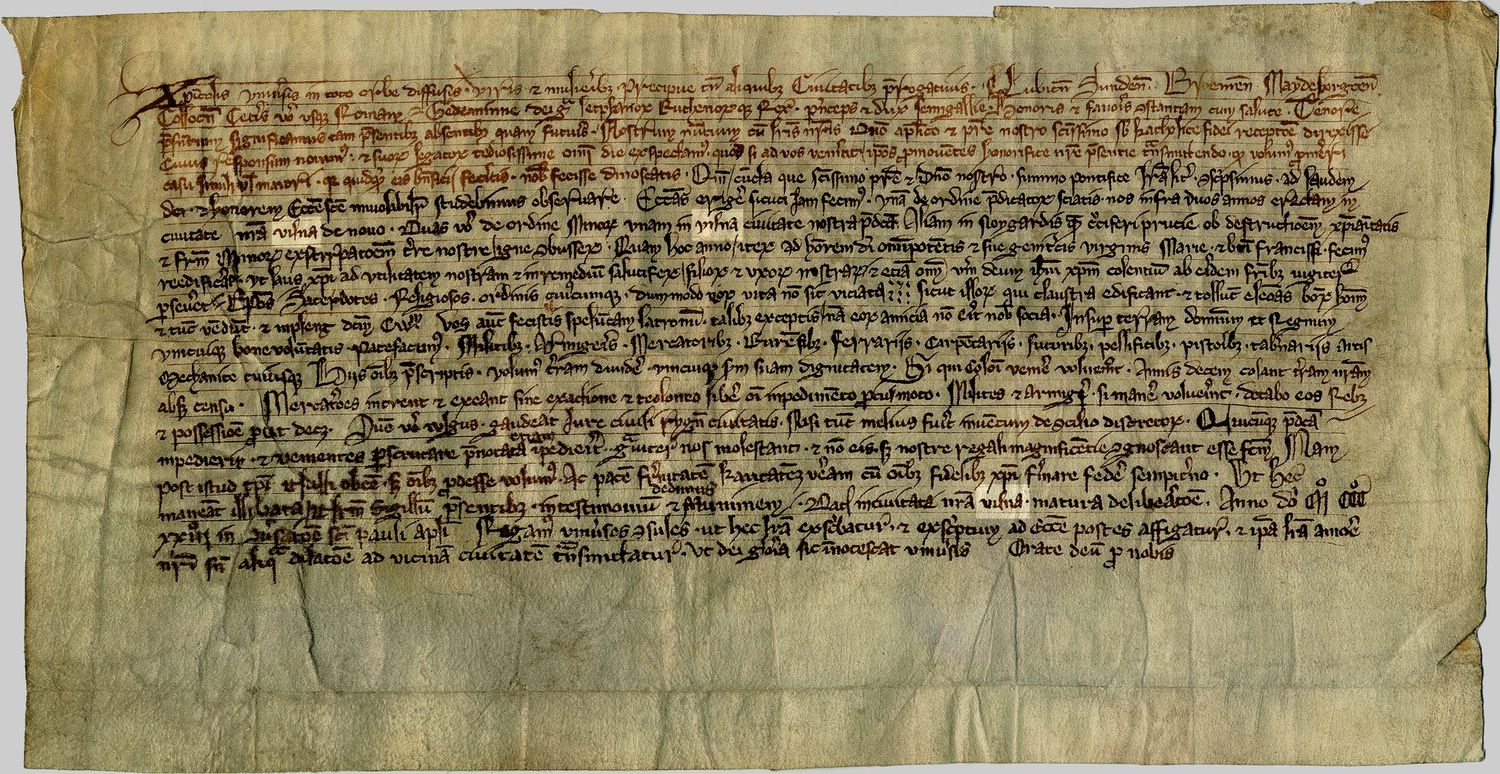
Transcript of Gediminas' letter, which is the oldest known mentioning of Lithuanian capital Vilnius in written sources (25 January 1323)

There are 6 surviving transcripts of letters of Gediminas written in 1323–1324 by Grand Duke Gediminas. These letters are one of the first surviving documents from the Grand Duchy of Lithuania. Since they were sent to Western Europe, the Pope, merchants, and craftspeople, they were written in Latin.

The first letter was written to Pope John XXII. Gediminas claimed that the Teutonic Knights did not act in the interest of the Catholic faith. Instead, they brutally devastated the land. The people were forced into resistance. Gediminas enumerated many crimes and damages done by the knights; for example, he claimed that his predecessor Vytenis sent a letter to the Franciscan friars asking for two brothers who could come to the Grand Duchy of Lithuania to look after a local church. When the Teutonic Knights learned about the letter, they sent their army and destroyed the church. In the last sentence Gediminas vaguely promised to accept Christianity and obey the pope.

The second letter was written on January 25, 1323 to the German cities of Lübeck, Sund, Bremen, Magdeburg, Cologne and other cities in the Holy Roman Empire. Gediminas explained that the Grand Duchy of Lithuania was very tolerant to the Christians, but remained pagan and did not accept Christianity only because of brutal Teutonic Knights. He told about the first letter sent to the pope and his intentions to baptize in the Catholic rite. Gediminas invited knights, squires, merchants, doctors, smiths, wheelwrights, cobblers, skinners, millers, and others to come to the Grand Duchy and practice their trade and faith without any restrictions. The peasants were promised tax exemption for ten years. The merchants were also exempt from any tariffs or taxes. This letter is best known because Vilnius, capital of Lithuania, was mentioned in written sources for the first time. Therefore, 1323 is considered to be the official founding year of Vilnius. Gediminas is considered to be the city's founder even though the city existed years before Gediminas' reign. Also, Vilnius is unambiguously mentioned as the capital city.

The third letter addressed to Lübeck, Rostock, Sund, Greifswald, Stetin, Gotland cities was written on May 26, 1323. In essence it repeated the second letter. It asked for various craftspeople (the list of crafts was expanded) to come to Lithuania and practice their trade. It said that there were three churches in the duchy: two Franciscan (in Vilnius and in Navahradak) and one Dominican. Everyone was free to use them.

The fourth and the fifth letters were also written on May 26, 1323 and were addressed to the Franciscan and Dominican Orders. Gediminas, in anticipation of his baptism, invited priests and friars to come to the Grand Duchy of Lithuania. He also asked to spread the word to craftspeople that they were welcome in Lithuania. In the letter to the Dominicans, Gediminas mentioned that his seal was burned by the Teutonic Knights.

The last surviving letter was written on September 22, 1324 and was addressed to the bishop of Tartu, Erzel, ruler of Tallinn land, and Council of Riga. It reported that the Teutonic Knights violated a peace treaty signed earlier. The Knights attacked border regions, killed residents, and took all valuables. Many messengers were captured and killed. Gediminas asked for help enforcing the treaty.
