= Mordechai of Lechovitch =

18th-century Hasidic rabbi

Rabbi Mordechai Jaffe of Lechovitch

Personal life
- Born: 1742 Nesvizh, Polish–Lithuanian Commonwealth
- Died: 18 January 1810 (aged 67–68) Stolin, Minsk Governorate, Russian Empire
- Parent: Noah HaPanchas (father)
- Dynasty: Lechovitch

Religious life
- Religion: Judaism
- Denomination: Hasidism

Jewish leader
- Successor: Rabbi Noach Yaffe
- Dynasty: Lechovitch

Rabbi Mordechai Jaffe of Lechovitch (1742 – 18 January 1810) was a Hasidic rabbi who was the disciple of Rabbi Shlomo of Karlin and was the founder of the Lechovitch dynasty of Hasidism, from which the Kobrin, Slonim, Koidanov, and Novominsk courts descended. He was the president of the Holy Land Fund for Jews in Israel.

== Biography ==
Jaffe was born in Nesvish in 1742 to Rabbi Noah HaPanchas of Nesvish, a descendant of Mordecai Yoffe, who raised him under the Jewish faith and officiated his Bar Mitzvah. For his education, he travelled to Rabbi Levi Yitzchak of Berditchev, who told Jaffe that "a third of the world rests on him". He later studied under Rabbi Shlomo of Karlin. He also travelled with his fellow student, Asher of Stolin (I), to Rabbi Boruch of Medzhybizh.

After his marriage, Jaffe continued to live in Nesvizh until the death of Rabbi Shlomo in July 1792, who was killed by the Cossack army. Following that development, he began to lead a community of Hasidism in Lyakhavichy, Belarus. His followers numbered in the thousands, and as he grew more popular, he was arrested in 1799 by the Russian government due to opposition to his practices by Russian elite. He was arrested along with Rabbi Shneur Zalman of Liadi and Rabbi Asher of Stolin, and was released later in the year.

He was appointed to serve as president of the Holy Land Fund on behalf of Kollel Raysin (of Belarus), where he worked extensively to financially support the Hasidic community in Eretz Yisrael, travelling to collect funds for them.

Jaffe died in Stolin on 18 January 1810 (13 Shvat 5570), present in the city for the wedding of his grandson Rabbi Shlomo Chaim Perlov. His children surviving him were:

- Rabbi Noach of Lechovitch, who succeeded him in the Lechovitch dynasty and as treasurer of the Kollel Raysin
- Rabbi Aharon of Lechovitch, who married the daughter of Rabbi Asher of Stolin and died before his father on 3 Shvat 5566 (20 January 1806)
- Rabbi Shlomo of Lechovitch
- A daughter, who married Rabbi Moshe Aharon, grandson of Rabbi Chaim Chaykl of Amdur

== Teachings ==
Epistle of Mordechai of Lechovitch

Now I have come to speak to their hearts, to restore the crown to its formerly glory in the golden age, the gold of that land, good for those who dwell before G-d in the land of the living, and what I will ask of them, and one of my questions to which I wish to awake, the point of their hearts burning like fire in the flames of fire and the flame of the LORD, to the land of the living, which is our share and the pleasantness of our destiny, one fate to G-d, and Jacob, his inheritance and ours to Israel with him. And do not be in their eyes as an old diotagma, only a new pland from the land of Israel. And awaken, please be generous for his generosity, to the crop that has come from them for two years which he has not demanded, and now they shall hold their land fiercely to his people, may he give and return and give at once a broad heart, and a new love in the holy affection shall be renewed among them... And I will pray to G-d through our land, and from the children to me will hear, and the living will let his heart be a complete act of righteousness in the square, very much commanded with joy and kindness.

—

As the disciple of Rabbi Shlomo, Jaffe followed in the footsteps of Karlin Hasidism, which emphasizes the importance of prayer with enthusiasm. He also emphasized among his followers the need for simple faith by memorizing Maimonides' 13 Tenets of Faith. His commentary of the Torah was printed in many books, such as his grandson Rabbi Shalom of Breihin-Koidinov's "Divre Shalom", "Mishmeret Shalom", "Or Yasharim", "Torat Avot", and "Mira Dachia".
