= Slonim (Hasidic dynasty) =

Belarusian Hasidic dynasty

Slonim Hasidic Dynasty
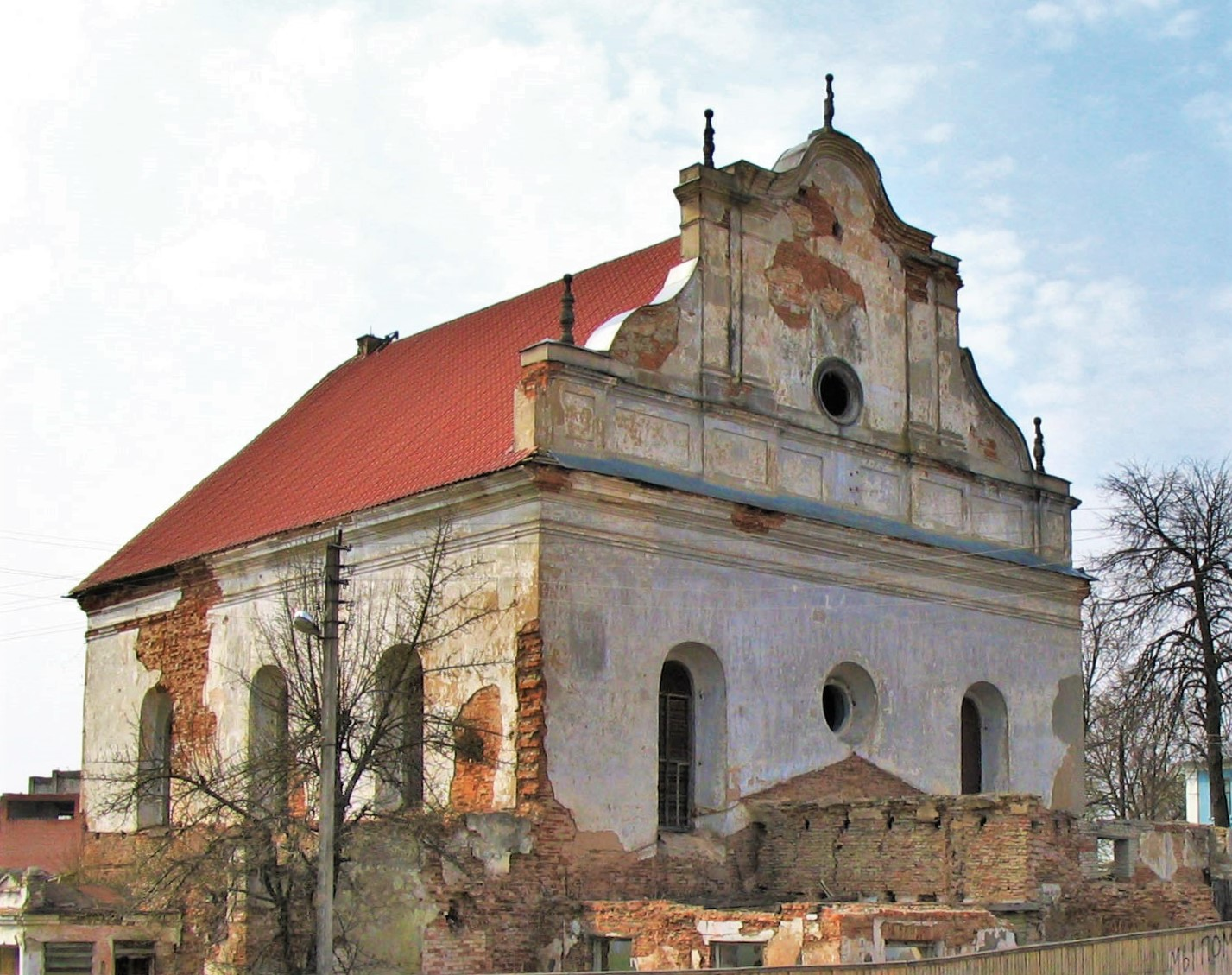
- A once vibrant synagogue in Slonim now in disrepair since the Holocaust.

Founder
- Rabbi Avraham Weinberg

Regions with significant populations
- Israel, United States, United Kingdom, Belgium, Australia, Canada

Religions
- Hasidic Judaism

Slonim is a Hasidic dynasty originating in the town of Slonim, which is now in Belarus. Today, there are two Slonimer factions. Slonim, based in Jerusalem, and the Slonim community in Bnei Brak. They are two distinct groups today, and have many differences between them.

The first Rebbe of Slonim, Rabbi Avraham Weinberg (1804–1883), was the author of Yesod HaAvodah. In 1873, he sent a group of his grandchildren and other Hasidim to settle in Ottoman Palestine; they set up their community in Tiberias. Almost all of the Slonimer Hasidim in Europe perished at the hands of the Nazis in the Holocaust. The present-day Slonimer community was rebuilt from the Slonimer Hasidim who had settled in Israel.

== Outline of Slonimer dynasty ==
=== Spiritual legacy ===
- Rabbi Israel Baal Shem Tov, founder of Hasidism

- Rabbi Dov Ber, the Maggid (Preacher) of Mezeritch, disciple of the Baal Shem Tov

- Rabbi Aaron Hagodol of Karlin, disciple of the Maggid

Rabbi Shlomo of Karlin, disciple of the Maggid and of Rabbi Aaron Hagodol of Karlin
- Rabbi Mordechai of Lechovitch, disciple of Rabbi Shlomo of Karlin

- Rabbi Noah of Lechovitch, son of Rabbi Mordechai

- Rabbi Moshe of Kobrin (1784 - 1858), disciple of Rabbi Noah of Lechovitch

Rabbi Avraham of Slonim (1804 - 11 Cheshvan 1883), disciple of Rabbi Noah of Lechovitch and Rabbi Moshe of Kobrin, and first Rebbe of Slonim

=== Lineage of Slonimer Rebbes ===
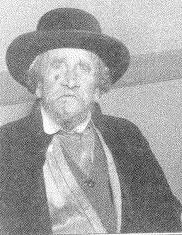
Grand Rabbi Mordechai Chaim of Slonim

- Rabbi Avraham of Slonim (1804 - 11 Cheshvan 1883), author of Yesod HaAvodah, first Slonmer Rebbe.

- Rabbi Shmuel Weinberg (1850-1916) of Slonim, author of Divrei Shmuel, also known as the "Foter", grandson of the Rabbi Avraham, author of Yesod HaAvodah.

- Rabbi Yissachar Leib Weinberg of Slonim (1873 - 1928), son of the Rabbi Shmuel, author of Divrei Shmuel.

- Rabbi Avraham Yehoshua Heshel Weinberg of Slonim-Tel Aviv, son of Rabbi Yissachar Leib.

- Rabbi Noah Weinberg of Slonim and Tiberias, grandson of the author of Yesod HaAvodah, brother of the author of Divrei Shmuel, a menahel of Yeshiva Or-Torah of Tiberias.
- Rabbi Matisyohu of Slonim, grandson of the author of Yesod HaAvodah.

- Rabbi Avraham Weinberg of Slonim (1884 - 1 Iyar 1933), author of Beis Avraham, son of Grand Rabbi Shmuel.

- Rabbi Shlomo David Yehoshua Weinberg of Slonim-Baranovitch (1912 – 1943), son of the Beis Avraham.

- Rabbi Mordechai Chaim of Slonim-Tiberias, grandson of the Yesod HaAvodah's brother, disciple of the Beis Avraham, successor of Rabbi Shlomo David Yehoshua Weinberg.

- Rabbi Avraham Weinberg of Tiberias and Jerusalem (Rosh Chodesh Tammuz 1889 - 12 Sivan 1981), author of Birkas Avraham, son of Rabbi Noah, disciple and nephew of the Divrei Shmuel, successor of Rabbi Mordechai Chaim.

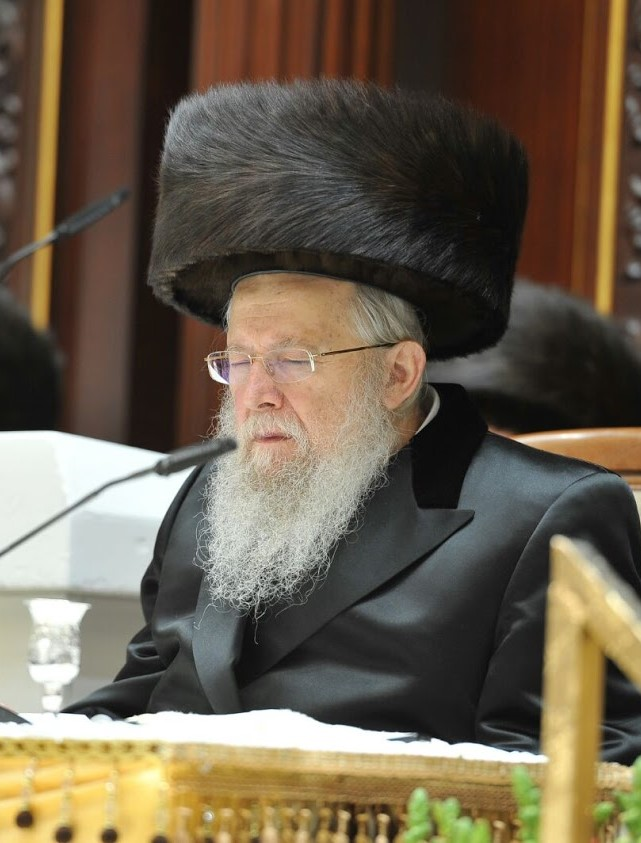
Slonimer Rebbe Shlita

- Rabbi Sholom Noach Berezovsky (1911-2000), Slonimer Rebbe of Jerusalem, author of Nesivos Shalom, son-in-law of the Birkas Avraham (R Avraham Weinberg). Worked diligently to reestablish Slonimer Hasidus from its small remnants after World War II. Published many Slonimer Hasidic books from original manuscripts and lost documents.

- Rabbi Shmuel Berezovski, author of Darchei Noam, present Slonimer Rebbe of Jerusalem, son of the Nesivos Shalom.

== Main Hasidic works of Slonim ==
In addition to those works revered by all Hasidim, the Slonimer Hasidim particularly revere the following books: Yesod HaAvodah, "Toras Avos", Divrei Shmuel, Beis Avraham, Birkas Avraham.

The Slonimer rebbes of Jerusalem have also authored two popular Hasidic works, Nesivos Shalom, by the previous Slonimer Rebbe of Jerusalem, and Darchei Noam, by the present Slonimer Rebbe of Jerusalem. Nesivos Shalom is extremely popular even outside of Hasidic circles.

== Controversy in Slonim school in Immanuel ==
Currently, in Israel, there reside approximately 1,900 families that follow the Slonimer Rebbe from Jerusalem. In 2010, a dispute arose in Immanuel, a Jewish settlement in the northern West Bank, over the integration of Ashkenazi Slonim girls in a school with Sephardi girls from non-religious families. Over 120,000 Torah-observant Jews, including Haredi and Dati Leumi Jews, rallied in Israel to keep the groups separate, with the fathers of 40 girls being jailed for their refusal to comply. The families insisted it was not a "racial" issue, as 30% of those in the Hasidic track are Sephardic and three of the fathers were Sephardic, but rather a "desire to remove their daughters from the influence of those less strict in their religious observance, watching TV at home, having access to the internet, and a more lax dress code among the other track in the school have been cited".

== See also ==
- Shmuel Yaakov Weinberg
- Yisrael Noah Weinberg
- Slonim Synagogue
