= Noach of Lechovitch =

Hasidic rabbi of the Lechovitch dynasty (1774–1832)

Rabbi Noach Jaffe of Lechovitch

Personal life
- Born: 1775
- Died: 2 October 1832 (aged 56-57)
- Spouse: Buma (d. 1874)
- Parent: Mordechai of Lechovitch (father)

Religious life
- Religion: Judaism

Jewish leader
- Successor: Rabbi Chaim Shlomo Perlow

Rabbi Noach Jaffe of Lechovitch (Hebrew: נח מלעכוויטש; Yiddish: דער זון,, romanized: Der Zon, lit. 'The Son'; 1775 – October 2, 1832) was a Hasidic rabbi of the Lechovitch dynasty as successor to his father, Rabbi Mordechai of Lechovitch. He was the president of the Holy Land Fund on behalf of Kollel Raysin.

== Biography ==
Jaffe was born in 1774 to Rabbi Mordechai of Lechovitch. He was a student of both his father and of Rabbi Boruch of Medzhybizh, grandson of the Baal Shem Tov. After his father's death in 1810, he traveled together with Rabbi Michal of Lechovitch to ask Rabbi Boruch for advice regarding the determination of the successor to his father. Rabbi Boruch instructed them that "Rabbi Noach will lead and rabbi Michal will assist."

He is notable for his refusal to speak words of the Torah in public. Because of this, his disciple, Rabbi Moshe Polier of Kobryn read the verse: "There is neither speech nor words; their voice is not heard. Their line goes forth throughout the earth, and their words are at the end of the world..." [Psalms 19:4] Noticing his difference in teaching style than his father, his disciples asked him why it was. He replied, "I do just like my father; My father did not imitate anyone, nor do I."

Rabbi Jaffe died in 1832. After his death, his nephew Rabbi Shlomo Chaim Perlow of Koidanov, son of Rabbi Aharon of Karlin II, succeeded him as rabbi. During Shavuot, his disciple Rabbi Moshe Polier of Kobryn withdrew with most of the congregation and founded the Kobryn Hasidic dynasty. His son-in-law, Mordechai of Lechovitch began to serve in his place.

Rabbi Mordechai Twersky said that Jaffe died out of both love and fear of God.

"A Jew who begins to question his emunah should have faith that he has faith! When he fails to feel the strength of that faith within, he should assure himself that the faith is there, but remains hidden and obscured. The faith is planted firmly in his soul by virtue of his relationship with the avos who vouchsafed it to him."

— Noach Jaffe, Emunah

== Sources ==
- Kleinman, Moshe Chaim (1967). אור ישרים (in Hebrew). Ashdod: Birkat Yosef Institute.
