= Misnagdim =

Jewish school of thought

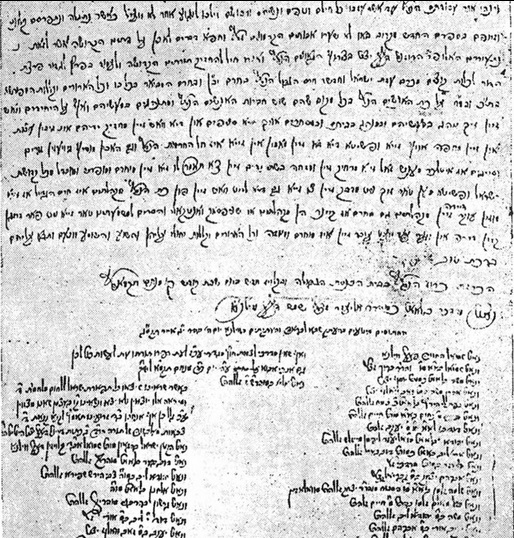
An anathema against the Hasidim, signed by the Gaon of Vilna and other community officials. August 1781.

Title page of the pamphlet *Zamir Aritzim ve-Charvot Tzurim* (Aleksnitz, 1772)—one of the few surviving copies, as it is alleged that the Hasidim had purchased and burned the entire print run.

Misnagdim (מתנגדים, "Opponents"; Sephardi pronunciation: Mitnagdim; singular misnaged / mitnaged) was a religious movement among the Jews of Eastern Europe which resisted the rise of Hasidism in the 18th and 19th centuries. The Misnagdim were particularly concentrated in Lithuania, where Vilnius served as the bastion of the movement, but anti-Hasidic activity was undertaken by the establishment in many locales. The most severe clashes between the factions took place in the latter third of the 18th century; the failure to contain Hasidism led the Misnagdim to develop distinct religious philosophies and communal institutions, which were not merely a perpetuation of the old status quo but often innovative. The most notable results of these efforts, pioneered by Chaim of Volozhin and continued by his disciples, were the modern, independent yeshiva and the Musar movement. Since the late 19th century, tensions with the Hasidim largely subsided, and the heirs of Misnagdim adopted the epithet Litvishe or Litvaks.

== Origins ==
The rapid spread of Hasidism in the second half of the 18th century greatly troubled many traditional rabbis; many saw it as heretical. Much of Judaism was still fearful of the messianic movements of the Sabbateans and the Frankists, the followers of the messianic claimants Sabbatai Zevi (1626–1676) and Jacob Frank (1726–1791), respectively. Many rabbis suspected Hasidism of an intimate connection with these movements.

Hasidism's founder was Rabbi Israel ben Eliezer (c. 1700 – 1760), known as the Baal Shem Tov ("master of the good name"; usually applied to a saintly Jew who was also a wonder-worker), or simply by the acronym Besht (Hebrew: בעש"ט); he taught that man's relationship with God depended on immediate religious experience, in addition to knowledge and observance of the details of the Torah and Talmud.

The characteristically misnagdic approach to Judaism was marked by a concentration on highly intellectual Talmud study; however, it by no means rejected mysticism. The movement's leaders, like the Gaon of Vilna and Chaim of Volozhin, were deeply immersed in kabbalah. Their difference with the Hasidim was their opposition to involving mystical teachings and considerations in the public life, outside the elitist circles which studied and practiced kabbalah. The Hasidic leaders' inclination to rule in legal matters, binding for the whole community (as opposed to strictures voluntarily adopted by the few), based on mystical considerations, greatly angered the Misnagdim. On another theoretical level, Chaim of Volozhin and his disciples did not share Hasidism's basic notion that man could grasp the immanence of God's presence in the created universe, thus being able to transcend ordinary reality and potentially infuse everyday actions with spiritual meaning. However, Volozhin's exact position on the issue is subject to debate among researchers. Some believe the differences between the two schools of thought were almost semantic, while others regard their understanding of key doctrines as starkly different.

Lithuania became the heartland of the traditionalist opposition to Hasidism, so "Lithuanian" and "misnaged" became virtually interchangeable terms in popular perception. However, a sizable minority of Greater Lithuanian Jews belong(ed) to Hasidic groups, including Chabad, Slonim, Karlin-Stolin (Pinsk), Amdur and Koidanov.

The first documented opposition to the Hasidic movement was from the Jewish community in Shklow, Lithuania, in 1772. Rabbis and community leaders voiced concerns about the Hasidim because they were going to Lithuania. The rabbis sent letters forbidding Hasidic prayer houses, urging the burning of Hasidic texts, and humiliating prominent Hasidic leaders. The rabbis imprisoned the Hasidic leaders in an attempt to isolate them from coming into contact with their followers.

== Opposition by the Vilna Gaon ==
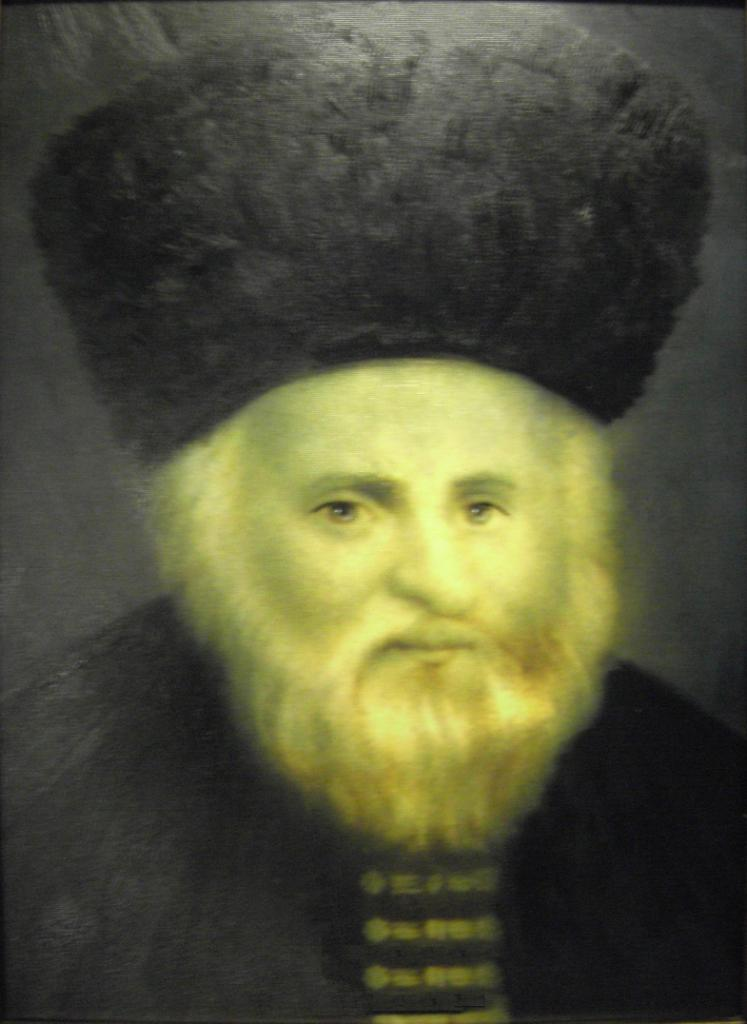
The Vilna Gaon

The excommunications against Hasidic Jews in 1772 was accompanied by the public destruction of early Hasidic pamphlets. The Vilna Gaon, Elijah ben Solomon Zalman, a prominent rabbi, galvanized opposition to Hasidic Judaism. He believed that the claims of miracles and visions made by Hasidic Jews were lies and delusions. A key point of opposition was that the Vilna Gaon maintained that greatness in Torah and Jewish religious observance must come through natural human efforts at Torah study without relying on any external "miracles" and "wonders". On the other hand, the Ba'al Shem Tov was focused on the emotional uplift of the Jewish people—especially following the Khmelnytsky Uprising (1648 – 1654) and the aftermath and disillusionment of the failed messiahships of Sabbatai Zevi and Jacob Frank. Opponents of Hasidism held that its followers viewed their rebbes idolatrously, if not as explicitly divine.

The Vilna Gaon expressed his disapproval of synagogues in which business was discussed and atheism openly believed, viewing them as disrespectful to sacred spaces. Other Jewish leaders criticized those claiming to be rabbis who did not honor Shabbat and mitzvot. He also opposed the assimilation of the Haskalah, aiming to enhance the spread of the Torah. Despite this, the Gaon encouraged the study of non-Jewish wisdom. It was noted that some who sought the role of rabbi did so out of a desire for power and recognition, a point often criticized in early Hasidism for lacking genuine pursuit of studying Torah for its own sake.

Despite the Vilna Gaon's opposition, the Chassidim have always held the Vilna Gaon in high regard, recognizing his greatness as a true Jewish sage and Tzadik.

== Hasidism's changes and challenges ==
Most of the changes made by the Hasidim were the product of the Hasidic approach to Kabbalah, mainly as expressed by Isaac Luria (1534 – 1572) and his disciples—particularly Hayyim ben Joseph Vital (1543–1620). Luria greatly influenced both misnagdim and Hasidim, but the former feared what they perceived as disturbing parallels in Hasidism to the heretical Sabbateans. An example of such an idea was that God entirely nullifies the universe. Depending on how this idea was preached and interpreted, it could give rise to pantheism, universally acknowledged as heresy, or lead to immoral behavior since elements of Kabbalah can be misconstrued to de-emphasize ritual and glorify sexual metaphors as a more profound means of grasping some inner hidden notions in the Torah based on the Jews' intimate relationship with God. If God is present in everything, and if divinity is to be grasped in erotic terms, then—Misnagdim feared—Hasidim might feel justified in neglecting legal distinctions between the holy and the profane, and in engaging in inappropriate sexual activities.

The Misnagdim were seen as using yeshivas and scholarship as the learning center. At the same time, Hasidic learning centered around the rebbe, which was tied in with what they considered emotional displays of piety.

The stress of Jewish prayer over Torah study and the Hasidic reinterpretation of Torah l'shma (Torah study for its own sake) was seen as a rejection of traditional Judaism.

Hasidim did not follow the traditional Ashkenazi prayer rite and instead used a combination of Ashkenazi and Sephardi rites and Lurianic Kabbalistic concepts known as Nusach Sefard. This was seen as a rejection of the traditional liturgy and, due to the resulting need for separate synagogues, a breach of communal unity. In addition, they faced criticism for neglecting the halakhic times for prayer.

Hasidic Jews also added some halakhic stringencies to kashrut, the laws of keeping kosher. They made specific changes in how livestock was slaughtered and in who was considered a reliable mashgiach (a legal supervisor of kashrut). The result was that they essentially did not accept as kosher certain foods that were accepted as kosher by Misnagdim. This was seen as a change of traditional Judaism, an over-stringency of Halakha, and, again, a breach of communal unity.

== Response to the rise of Hasidism ==
With the rise of what would become known as Hasidism in the late 18th century, established conservative rabbinic authorities actively worked to stem its growth. Whereas before the breakaway Hasidic synagogues were occasionally opposed but largely checked, its spread into Lithuania and Belarus prompted a concerted effort by opposing rabbis to halt its spread.

In late 1772, after uniting the scholars of Brisk, Minsk and other Belarusian and Lithuanian communities, the Vilna Gaon then issued the first of many polemical letters against the nascent Hasidic movement, which was included in the anti-Hasidic anthology, Zemir aritsim ve-ḥarvot tsurim (1772). The letters published in the anthology included pronouncements of excommunication against Hasidic leaders on the basis of their worship and habits, all of which were seen as unorthodox by the Misnagdim. This included but was not limited to unsanctioned places of worship and ecstatic prayers, as well as charges of smoking, dancing, and the drinking of alcohol. In total, this was seen to be a radical departure from the Misnagdic norm of asceticism, scholarship, and stoic demeanor in worship and general conduct, and was viewed as a development that needed to be suppressed.

Between 1772 and 1791, other Misnagdic tracts of this type would follow, all targeting the Hasidim in an effort to contain and eradicate them from Jewish communities. The harshest of these denouncements came between 1785 and 1815 combined with petitioning of the Russian government to outlaw the Hasidim on the grounds of their being spies, traitors, and subversives.

However, this would not be realized. After the death of the Vilna Gaon in 1797 and the partitions of Poland in 1793 and 1795, the regions of Poland where there were disputes between Misnagdim and Hasidim came under the control of governments that did not want to take sides in intra-Jewish conflicts, but that wanted instead to abolish Jewish autonomy. In 1804 Hasidism was legalized by the Imperial Russian government, and efforts by the Misnagdim to contain the now-widespread Hasidim were stymied.

== Winding down the battles ==
By the mid-19th century, most non-Hasidic Judaism had discontinued its struggle with Hasidism and reconciled itself to establishing the latter as a fact. One reason for the reconciliation between the Hasidim and the Misnagdim was the rise of the Haskalah movement. While many followers of this movement were observant, it was also used by the absolutist state to change Jewish education and culture, which both Misnagdim and Hasidim perceived as a greater threat to religion than they represented to each other. In the modern era, Misnagdim evolved into "Litvishe" or "Yeshivish."

== Litvishe ==
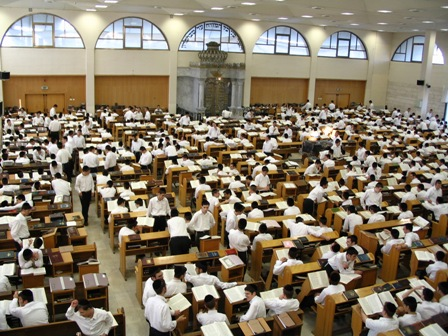
Litvishe yeshiva students in Israel

Litvishe is a Yiddish word that refers to Haredi Jews who are not Hasidim (and not Hardalim or Sephardic Haredim). It literally means Lithuanian. While Litvishe functions as an adjective, the plural noun form often used is Litvaks. The Hebrew plural noun form which is used with the same meaning is Lita'im. Other expressions are Yeshivishe and Misnagdim. It has been equated with the term "Yeshiva world".

The words Litvishe, Lita'im, and Litvaks are all somewhat misleading, because there are also Hasidic Jews from Lithuania, and many Lithuanian Jews who are not Haredi.

Litvishe Jews largely identify with the Misnagdim, who "objected to what they saw as Hasidic denigration of Torah study and normative Jewish law in favor of undue emphasis on emotionality and religious fellowship as pathways to the Divine." The term Misnagdim ("opponents") is somewhat outdated since the former opposition between the two groups has lost much of its salience, so the other terms are more common.

== See also ==
- Degel HaTorah
- History of the Jews in Lithuania
- Schisms among the Jews
- Yechezkel Landau
