= The Undivine Comedy =

1835 play by Polish Romantic poet Zygmunt Krasiński

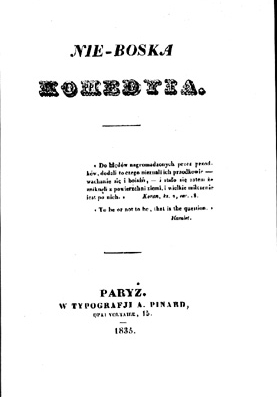
The Undivine Comedy, 1835 edition

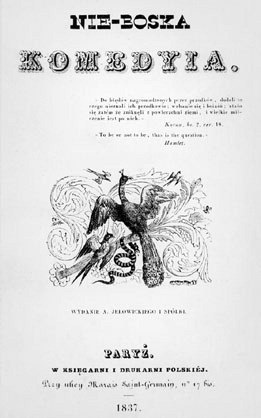
The Undivine Comedy, 1837 edition

The Undivine Comedy, 1923 edition

The Undivine Comedy or The Un-divine Comedy (Polish: Nie Boska komedia or Nie-boska komedia), (Note: The title has also been rendered in English as The Non-Divine Comedy, The Ungodly Comedy, The Infernal Comedy, and The Unholy Comedy. Gerard T. Kapolka suggested that a better title conveying Krasiński's intent might be The Godless Comedy, while Mary Lowell Putnam proposed The Profane Comedy.) is a play written by Polish Romantic poet Zygmunt Krasiński in 1833, published anonymously in 1835. Its main theme is sociopolitical conflict – in Krasiński's words, "[between] aristocracy and democracy". It is Krasiński's best-known work and is regarded as one of the most important works of Polish Romantic literature.

== History ==
Krasiński began work on The Undivine Comedy in June 1833 in Vienna, and finished it in autumn the following year in Venice. It was published in Paris in 1835 anonymously, likely to protect the author's family from any repercussions in the Russian Empire, of which they were subjects. Krasiński's writings often contained thinly veiled references to current politics.

Krasiński would later work on another drama related to The Undivine Comedy. He considered composing a trilogy, of which the Undivine Comedy would likely have been the middle part, but he never finished the project (the draft of the first part would eventually be published in 1852 as Sen. Pieśń z „Niedokończonego poematu”, wyjęta z pozostałych rękopisów po świętej pamięci J. S., and more extensively, posthumously as Niedokończony poemat – The Unfinished Poem in 1860). The entire trilogy was to have featured the same protagonist, Count Henry, called "The Youth" in the unfinished prequel, and "The Husband" in The Undivine Comedy.

The play has been translated into more than a dozen languages. Within a few years it received a French translation by Władysław Mickiewicz. Based on the French translation, in 1868 Robert Lytton published a drama titled Orval, or the Fool of Time which has been inspired by Krasiński's work to the point it has been discussed in scholarly literature as an example of a "rough translation", paraphrase or even plagiarism.The Undivine Comedy was first translated to English in 1864 by Marthy Walker Cook (although she based it on earlier French and German translations), again in 1924 (by Harriette E. Kennedy and Zofia Umińska, with a preface by G. K. Chesterton), for the third time in 1977 (By Harold B. Segel) and most recently in 1999 (by Charles S. Kraszewski).

Initially it was considered too difficult to be adopted properly into a theatre, and it was never staged during Krasiński's liftetime. It was finally put on the stage in 1902 in the Juliusz Słowacki Theatre in Kraków by Józef Kotarbiński and since that time it has been staged numerous times in Poland and abroad. Gordon M. Wickstrom, writing in 1972, noted that "since World War II nearly all leading Polish directors have undertaken" directing the play, also noting that while it has been produced in a number of other European countries, it has remained "unproduced and nearly unknown in English". In 1988 Michael Finnissy directed an operatic version of it, shown in Paris and London. In Poland, it has been directed by among others Arnold Szyfman (Warsaw 1920), Leon Schiller (Warsaw 1926, Łódź 1938), Bohdan Korzeniewski (Warsaw 1959), Konrad Swinarski (Kraków 1965), Adam Hanuszkiewicz (Warsaw 1969) and Jerzy Grzegorzewski (Warsaw 2002) to the music of composers such as Ludomir Różycki, Jan Maklakiewicz, Grażyna Bacewicz and Krzysztof Penderecki staged the play from the 1920s onward.

It has been a part of secondary-education curriculum in Poland since at least 1923.

== Plot ==
The plot of the drama takes place in the near future, where Krasiński used recent contemporary events, such as the French Revolution, and the ensuing power struggle between the Jacobins and other factions as inspiration and extrapolating a number of social trends, describing a fictional pan-European revolution against the Christian aristocracy. The protagonist of the drama, Count Henry (in Polish, Henryk), is a conflicted poet, who finds himself leading, together with his fellow aristocrats, a defense of the Holy Trinity castle, (Note: A real castle (Okopy Świętej Trójcy), located in the Okopy, Ternopil Oblast.) against revolutionary forces professing democratic and atheist ideals, commanded by a leader named Pancras (in Polish, Pankracy). In the end, both sides are portrayed as a failure: while the revolutionaries take the castle, their leader increasingly doubts the righteousness of their cause, and the drama ends with him seeing a vision of Christianity triumphing after all.

The play is divided into four parts and thirty-two scenes. The first two parts of the work build up the character of Count Henry, focusing on his private life as a husband, father, and artist; while the next two are focused on large revolutionary struggle.

== Analysis ==
The initial title of the drama was Mąż (The Husband). Another title that Krasiński considered was Ludzka Komedia (The Human Comedy). (Note: This title, likely mentioned to Honoré de Balzac by their mutual friend Henry Reeve, may have inspired the French author to give that title to his own La Comédie humaine.) That title as well as the final title of the drama that Krasiński settled on were both inspired by Dante's Divine Comedy and have a double meaning: it depicts history as a work of humanity, or as a comedy taking place in absence of divine intervention, but contrary to God's will. The work has been influenced by Krasiński's thoughts about the Polish November Uprising and the contemporary French July Revolution of 1830, coupled with his study of the changes wrought by the emerging capitalism to Western Europe.

Krasiński's work effectively discussed the concept of class struggle before Karl Marx coined the term. It has been described as the "first literary expression of class war" and a "queer prefiguring of Marx". The philosophy of the revolutionaries in the drama has been described as "nothing other than dialectical materialism". The drama's themes are social revolution and the destruction of the noble class. It is critical both of the weak and cowardly aristocracy, whose destruction it prophesied, but also of the revolution, which he portrayed as a destructive force. The work is also tackling the topics of the identity of a poet, the nature of poetry, and myths of romantic ideals such as perfect love, fame and happiness.

Count Henry has been analyzed as an example of the "worst possible version of Romantic individualism", conceited and egoistical, only partially redeemed by his service to humankind, a task in which he will ultimately fail as well. Professing to defend the Christian ideals, he ultimately commits the sin of suicide. He has also been described as influenced by Goethe's Faust.

Halina Floryńska-Lalewicz summarized the message of the work as follows: "Krasiński seems to say that in historical reality neither side can be fully in the right. Righteousness resides solely in the divine dimension, and it can be brought into the world by none other than Providence and the forces aligned with it. Man caught up in history is always a tragic figure, condemned to be imperfect and make the wrong choices."

One aspect of the Undivine Comedy that has attracted criticism is its presentation of Jews as conspirators against the Christian world order. Published in 1835, it was one of the first works – perhaps the first – in a string of modern antisemitic literature leading to The Protocols of the Elders of Zion. Maria Janion thus termed it a "tainted masterpiece". According to Agata Adamiecka-Sitek, this poses a significant problem today, as the work "is both canonical and profoundly embarrassing for Polish culture, on par perhaps with The Merchant of Venice in the western theatre canon." The controversial nature of the material led to the cancellation of a recent stage production by director Oliver Frljić, that was due to open in 2014 in Warsaw.

== Reception ==
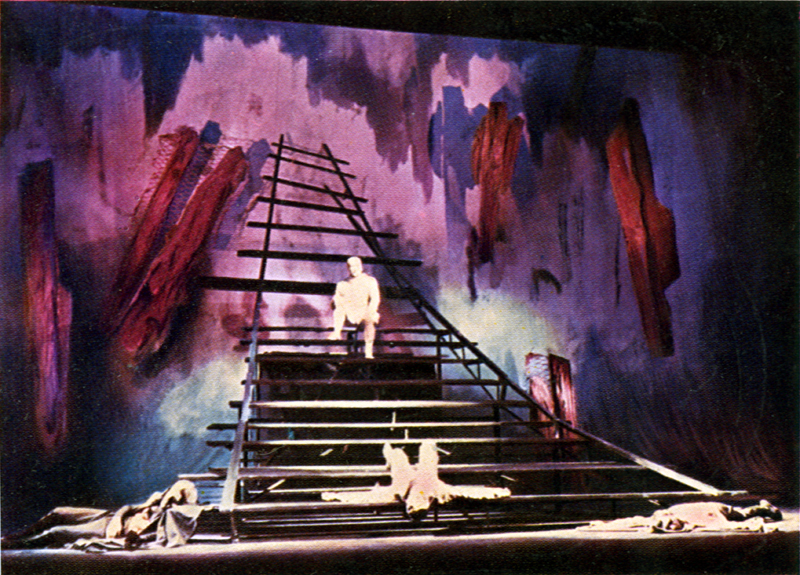
The Undivine Comedy, performance in Teatr Nowy Łodź, 1959

The 19th-century romantic poet Adam Mickiewicz discussed The Undivine Comedy in four lectures at the Collège de France, calling it "the highest achievement of the Slavic theater", as well as "thoroughly nationalistic... [touching on] all the problems of Polish messianism." He criticized Krasiński for his depictions of the "Israelites" – Jews – which he characterized as a "national offense".

In 1915 Monica Mary Gardner, in her biography of Krasiński, described the play as a "masterpiece of matured genius".

In 1959, over a century after the play was first published, Wacław Lednicki writing in The Polish Review, called it a "masterpiece of Polish drama".

In 1969 the Polish writer and Nobel laureate Czesław Miłosz, in his History of Polish Literature, called The Undivine Comedy "truly pioneering" and "undoubtedly a masterpiece not only of Polish but also of world literature". Miłosz notes that it is surprising that such a brilliant work was created by an author barely out of his teens.

In 1972 Gordon M. Wickstrom, writing in the Educational Theatre Journal, called it "the finest achievement of Polish Romantic drama".

In 1983 Robert Mann, in the Slavic and East European Journal, noted that the play "ranks alongside Mickiewicz's Forefather's Eve and Słowacki's Kordian as one of the greatest dramatic works in Polish Romantic literature.

In 1986 Frank Northen Magill, in the Critical Survey of Drama: Authors, wrote that "The Undivine Comedy... suffices to ensure Krasiński's position as a dramatist of international stature".

In 1997 Megan L. Dixon, writing in the same journal as Robert Mann, described the play as "a classic of 19th-century High Romanticism... worthy of comparison to Goethe or Byron".

In 2000 Gerard T. Kapolka, in The Polish Review, referred to it as a "great play".

In 2004 Halina Floryńska-Lalewicz, in her biography of Krasiński (published at Culture.pl), called it an outstanding example of Romantic metaphysical drama.

In 2014 Harold B. Segel, in Polish Romantic Drama: Three Plays in English Translation, wrote that "the play has steadily gained prestige in the twentieth century and is widely regarded in contemporary Poland as one of the greatest dramatic works to emerge from the Romantic period."
