= Baal Shem Tov =

Polish founder of Hasidic Judaism (1698–1760)

Personal life
- Born: Yisroel ben Eliezer c. 1700 Okopy Świętej Trójcy, Kingdom of Poland (now Ukraine) or Principality of Moldavia (now Romania)
- Died: 1760 Międzybóż, Kingdom of Poland (now Ukraine)
- Buried: Międzybóż
- Spouse: Chana (only named in legends)
- Children: Tsvi of Pinsk (1729–1779); Udel (1720–1787)
- Parents: Eliezer (father); Sara (only named in legends) (mother)

Religious life
- Religion: Judaism

Jewish leader
- Successor: Dov Ber of Mezeritch (1704–1772)
- Main work: Keter Shem Tov; Tzavaat HaRivash; Baal Shem Tov Al Hatora

Israel ben Eliezer (Note: Hebrew: ישראל בן אליעזר; also transliterated Yisroel or Yisrael.) (c. 1700 −1760), known as the Baal Shem Tov (/ˌbɑːl ˈʃɛm ˌtʊv, ˌtʊf/; Hebrew: בעל שם טוב) or BeShT (בעש״ט), was a Jewish mystic and healer regarded as the founder of Hasidic Judaism. A baal shem tov is a "Master of the Good Name". The term has also been used to refer to one able to work miracles using a secret name of God. Other sources explain his sobriquet as arising from a reputation of being a saintly, or superior, Baal Shem ('miracle-worker'); hence, he was given the nickname Baal Shem Tov (the "good Baal Shem").

Biographical information about the Baal Shem Tov comes from contemporary documents from the Polish–Lithuanian Commonwealth and the legends about his life and behavior collected in the Praise of the Besht (שבחי הבעש״ט, Shivḥei haBesht).

A central tenet of the teachings associated with the Baal Shem Tov is devekut, a direct connection with the divine, which is infused in every human activity and every waking hour. Prayer is of supreme importance, along with the mystical significance of Hebrew letters and words.

== Biography ==
=== Birth ===
Israel was born about 1700 to a certain Eliezer. According to Shivḥei haBesht,

Eliezer lived at the edge of Wallachia. He and his wife were elderly. Once upon a time, they were captured and taken prisoner to a far-away land . . . Eliezer found his wife, who thankfully still lived, and the Besht was born when each was near 100 years old.

According to other early Hasidic legends, he was born in "Okop" (probably Okopy, Ternopil Oblast), although Shivḥei haBesht mentions him residing there only as an adolescent, and only in a parenthetical insertion by the 1815 printer. Later legend names his mother Sarah.

Romanian-Israeli historian Moshe Idel claims that Baal Shem Tov was born in the Principality of Moldavia, in what is today Bukovina. He says that "Wallachia" from the Shivhei haBesht does not mean the Principality of Wallachia, but Moldavia, also kown as Moldo-Wallachia (Romanian: Moldo-Vlahia). Idel concludes that there is no solid evidence that he was born in Okopy: "the founder of Hasidism was born to a poor family that inhabited an unknown place on the Romanian part of the border with the Kingdom of Poland... there is no extant evidence whatsoever that the Besht was born in Okopy".

=== Career ===
Solomon Isaac Halpern (1727 or 1729-1791) records two anecdotes about his father Jacob (1698–1738), the rabbi of Zhvanets, meeting "the renowned Israel Baal Shem, master of divine knowledge" that are non-legendary, as Halpern was not a hasid, although he was only between 9 and 11 when his father died. The Baal Shem Tov performed a dream question, and discovered Jacob was the reincarnation of Isaac Alfasi, a famous Maghrebi scholar. These meetings necessarily occurred before 1738.

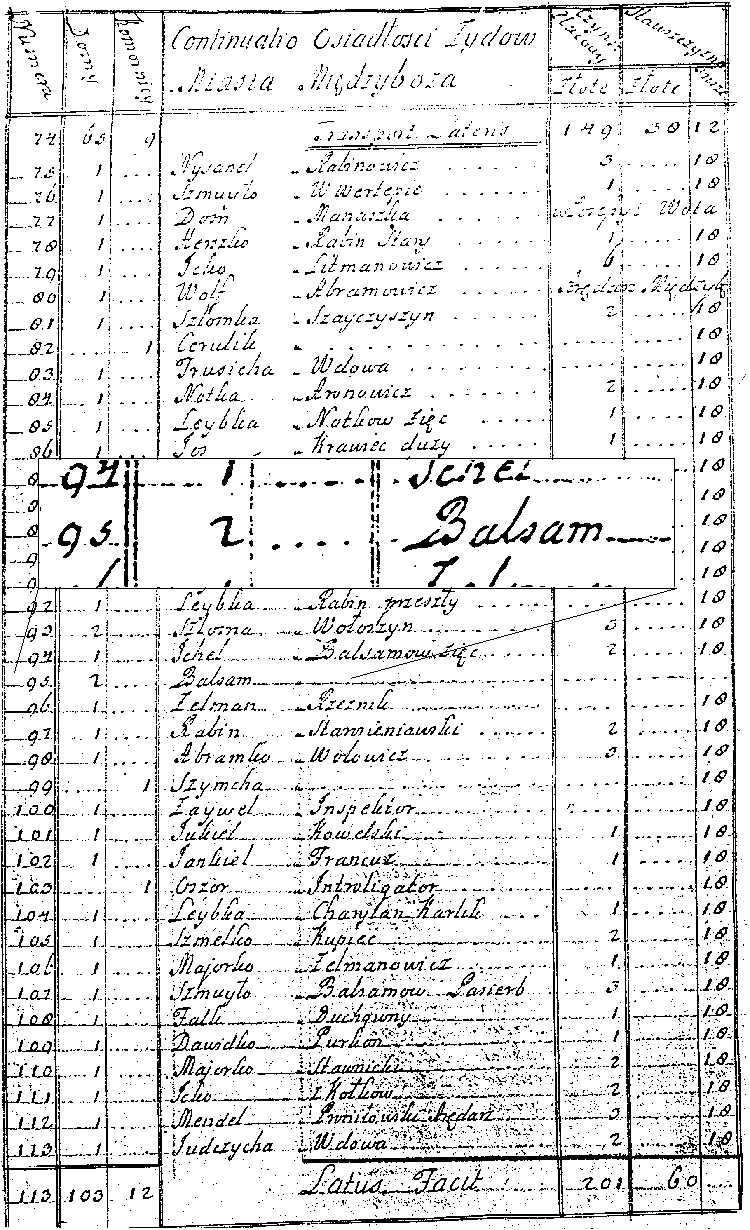
1758 Polish tax census of Medzhybizh showing "Balsam" in house #95

Polish census records show that a certain holy man lived in Medzhybizh from 1740 to 1760, which was presumably Israel. In 1740, the census describes a "kabbalist," in 1742 and 1758 a "baal shem", and in 1760 a "baal shem doctor", the last being perhaps testimony to Israel's thaumaturgical practice.

Meir Teomim writes in Meirat Einayim (1782), "I saw a letter from the Holy Land, written by the pious Rabbi Gershon to his brother-in-law, the renowned master of the Good Name, Rabbi Israel, may he live". From the honorific "may he live", it seems that this book was composed in Israel's lifetime; this is the only time the Baal Shem Tov was mentioned by name before his death.

Beyond these scant sources, a few letters on theological subjects, attributed to Israel, were printed posthumously. Their authenticity is debated by scholars. Nothing more can be gleaned of his biography from contemporary sources.

=== Death ===
He is last seen in the census as a resident of Medzhybizh in 1760. By 1763 another resided in the house, and Hasidic legends give various dates around 1760.

== Posthumously printed letters ==
Several letters attributed to Israel or his associates have been printed since his death, and scholars debate their authenticity. According to a letter supposedly from Besht's brother-in-law to Israel himself—as interpreted by Rosman—the latter was a practitioner of prophecy, being able to see a messianic figure arrive in Jerusalem despite living far from the city; the brother-in-law claims to have inquired into the figure and discovered the Besht's vision to be true. This would support the belief that the Besht could see the souls of men, divining the messianic quality of him despite only seeing him through a vision.

Rosman also describes another letter the brother-in-law wrote, which claims that the Besht could travel to heaven and commune with God. This view is derived from a series of titles given to the Besht, attributing various religious achievements to him such as understanding the mysteries of God.

== Legacy ==
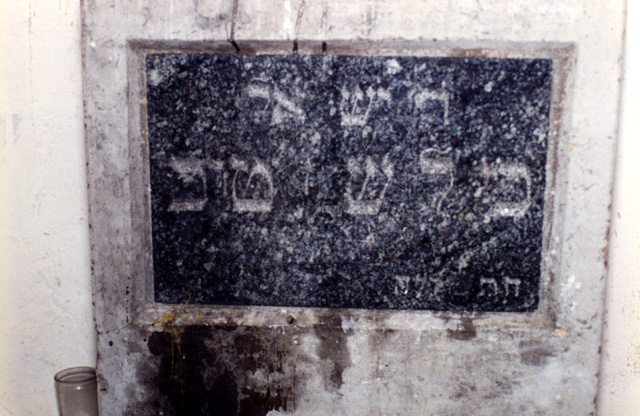
Monument to the Baal Shem Tov in Medzhybizh (before restoration in 2006–2008), inscribed רבי ישראל בעל שם טוב

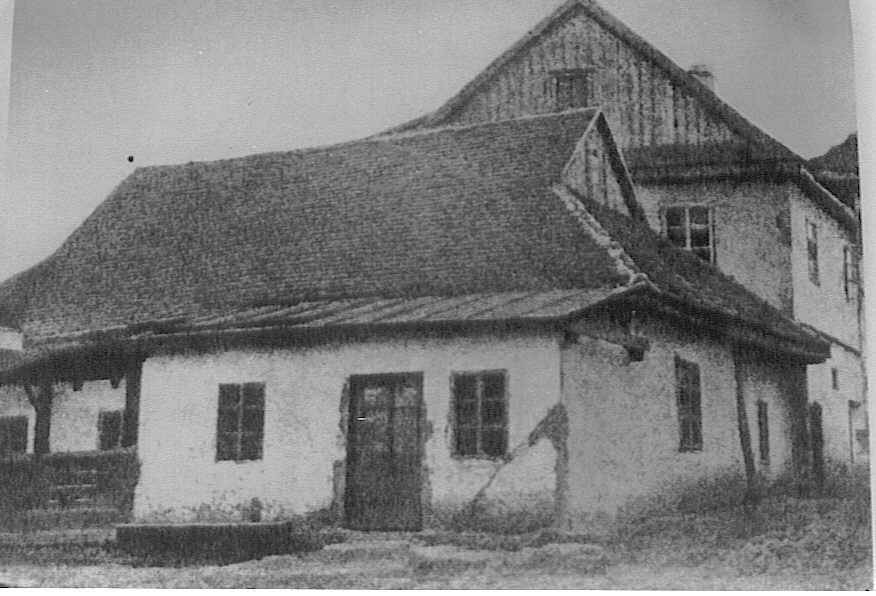
The old synagogue of Medzhybizh (c. 1915). This building, which was never used by Israel (he preferred an alternate minyan), burned during World War II. Today a replica attracts tourists to Medzhybizh under the name "Baal Shem Tov Shul". A second replica opened in 2022 as a community synagogue in Wesley Hills, NY.

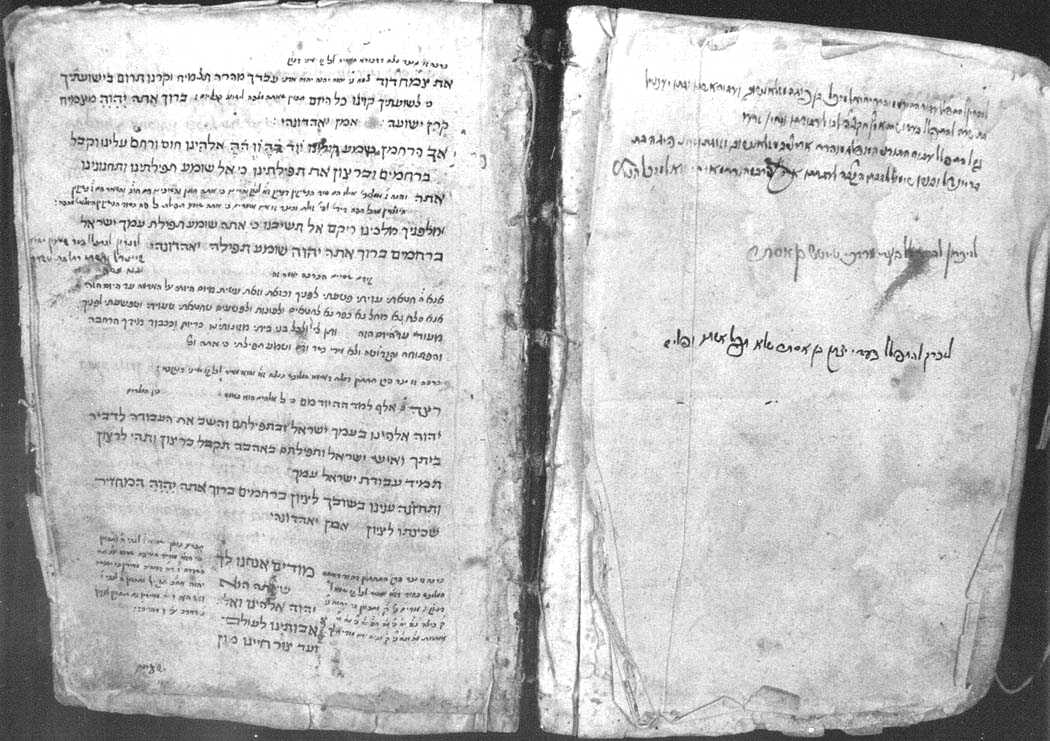
An 18th-century Kabbalistic siddur in the Chabad library. Chabad claims that Israel used this siddur.

Israel ben Eliezer left no books; a kabbalistic commentary on Psalm 107, ascribed to him (Zhytomyr, 1804), Sefer miRabbi Yisrael Baal Shem-tov, is not genuine. The only record of his teachings is in his utterances as recorded in the works of his disciples. Most are found in the works of Jacob Joseph of Polnoy. Since Hasidism immediately after its founder's death was divided into various parties, each claiming for itself the authority of Besht, utmost caution is necessary for judging the authenticity of utterances ascribed to Besht.

Jacob Joseph quotes over 800 teachings of Israel in his books. Jacob Joseph sometimes says he is unsure whether a quote is the "exact" words of the Baal Shem Tov, implying that other quotes are verbatim.

The later developments of Hasidism are unintelligible without consideration of Besht's reputed opinions on man's proper relation with the universe. True worship of God consists of cleaving to and unifying with God. He is supposed to have said, "The ideal of man is to be a revelation himself, clearly to recognize himself as a manifestation of God." Mysticism, then, is not the Kabbalah, which everyone may learn. That sense of true oneness is usually as strange, unintelligible, and incomprehensible to mankind as dancing to a dove, but someone capable of this feeling is endowed with a genuine intuition, and the perception of such a man is prophecy according to the degree of his insight. From this it results that the ideal man may lay claim to authority equal, in a certain sense, to the authority of the Prophets. This focus on oneness and personal revelation help earn his mystical interpretation of Judaism the title of Panentheism.

The doctrine's second and more important result is that man forms a connecting link between the Creator and creation through his oneness with God. Thus, slightly modifying the Bible verse Habbakuk 2:, Israel is quoted as saying, "The righteous can vivify by his faith." His followers enlarged upon this idea and consistently deduced from it the source of divine mercy, blessings, and life; therefore, one may partake of God's mercy if one loves him.

It may be said of Hasidism that there is no other Jewish sect in which the founder is as crucial as his doctrines. Israel himself is still the real center for the Hasidim; his teachings have almost sunk into oblivion. Solomon Schechter observed that Hasidim view Baal Shem as "the incarnation of a theory, and his whole life the revelation of a system."

Chapin and Weinstock contend that the Besht was essentially the right person in the right place at the right time. 18th-century Podolia was ideal for fostering a sea change in Jewish thinking. It had been depopulated a generation earlier due to the pogroms of the Khmelnytsky uprising. The Ottoman occupation of Podolia occurred within Israel's lifetime, and along with it, the influence within this frontier territory of Sabbatai Zevi and his latter-day spiritual descendants such as Hayim Malakh and Jacob Frank. Once the Magnates of Poland and Lithuania regained control of Podolia, it underwent an economic boom. The Magnates valued the financial benefits the Jews provided and encouraged Jewish resettlement to help protect the frontier from future invasions. Thus, the Jewish community itself was essentially starting over.

== Notable students ==
His students, some of whom founded dynasties, include the following.

- Jacob Joseph of Polonne (1710–1784)
- Ze'ev Wolf Kitzes of Medzhybizh (~1685–1788)
- Dov Ber of Mezeritch (1704–1772)
- Pinchas Shapiro of Koretz (1726–1791)
- Nachum Twerski of Chernobyl (1730–1797) founder of the Chernobyl Hasidic dynasty
- Abraham Gershon of Kitov, (1701–1761) (his brother-in-law)
- Moshe Chaim Ephraim of Sudilkov (1748–1800) (his grandson)
- Boruch of Medzhybizh (1753–1811) (his grandson)
- Meir Hagadol of Premishlan (1703–1773)
- Nachman of Horodenka (d. 1765)

== Legends ==
Hasidim soon filled volumes with fantastical legends about his life. These volumes, especially Shivḥei haBesht (1815), are presumed to contain a small historical kernel, but scholars debate which passages are credible.

- The opening legend of Shivḥei haBesht tells that his father, Eliezer, was seized during an attack, carried from his home in Wallachia, and sold as a slave to a prince. On account of his wisdom, he found favor with the prince, who gave him to the king to be his minister. During an expedition undertaken by the king, when other counsel failed, and all were disheartened, Eliezer's advice was accepted; and the result was a successful battle of decisive importance. Eliezer was made a general and afterward prime minister, and the king gave him the viceroy's daughter in marriage. But mindful of his duty as a Jew, as he was already married, he married the princess only in name. After being questioned for a long time as to his strange conduct, he confessed he was a Jew to the princess, who loaded him with costly presents and helped him escape to his country. On the way, the prophet Elijah is said to have appeared to Eliezer and said: "On account of thy piety and steadfastness, thou wilt have a son who will lighten the eyes of all Israel; and Israel shall be his name because in him shall be fulfilled the verse (Isaiah 49:3): 'Thou art my servant, O Israel, in whom I will be glorified.'" Eliezer and his wife Sarah reached old age childless and had given up all hope of ever having a child. But when they were nearly 100 years old, the promised son, Israel, was born.
- In 1703, Israel became an orphan and was adopted by the Jewish community of Tluste. After completing his studies at the local ḥeder, he often wandered into the village's fields and forests.
- In 1710, he finished cheder and became an assistant to a melamed (ḥeder teacher).
- In 1711, at the age of 13/14, he joined the ḥaburat Machane Yisroel, a group of secret tzadikim led by Adam Baal Shem. Adam introduced him to Kabbalah.
- Sometime in 1712 Israel became the shammash (sexton) of the local synagogue.
- He was hired as a teacher's assistant in the heders of the small villages they passed through. He later related that he took great pleasure in accompanying the children to and from school, using this opportunity to recite prayers with them and tell them Torah stories. Dov Ber of Mezeritch would later say, "If only we kissed a Torah scroll with the same love that my master [the Baal Shem Tov] kissed the children when he took them to heder as a teacher's assistant!"
- He had visions in which the prophet Ahijah the Shilonite would appear to him.
- In 1716, Israel married, but soon after, his wife died, and he traveled throughout Eastern Galicia. After serving for a long time as a helper in various small communities of West Ukraine, he settled as a melamed in Tluste.
- Israel became the leader of this movement at the age of 18. Caring for the Jewish poor, the group of tzadikim encouraged Jews to move to agrarian lifestyles as alternatives to the chronic poverty of city Jews. Continuing this policy, they decided they needed to look after the educational needs of the children living in small farm communities. If a suitable teacher could not be sourced, they would provide one, so Israel became a teacher's assistant. He later commented "The most joyous time in my life was teaching the small children how to say Modeh Ani, Shema Yisrael and Kamatz alef, Ah".
- He was chosen by people conducting suits against each other to act as their arbitrator and mediator. His services were brought into frequent requisition because the Jews had their own civil courts in Poland.
- He is said to have made such an impression on Ephraim of Brody that the latter promised Israel his daughter Channah in marriage. The man died, however, without telling his daughter of her betrothal; but when she heard of her father's wishes, she agreed to comply with them. After their marriage, the couple moved to a village in the Carpathians between Kuty and Kassowa, where their only income was from his work digging clay and lime, which his wife delivered to surrounding villages. The couple had two children: Udl (born in 1720) and Zvi Hersh. A maternal great-grandson of Israel and his wife was Nachman of Breslov whose paternal ancestry came from (according to Hasidic tradition), the Maharal's family descended patrilineally from the Exilarchs of the geonic era and therefore also from the Davidic line.
- Israel later took a position as a shohet (ritual butcher) in Kshilowice, near Iaslowice, which he soon gave up to manage a village tavern that his brother-in-law bought for him. His first appearance in public was that of an ordinary Baal Shem, a faith healer who wrote amulets and prescribed cures,
- After many trips in Podolia and Volhynia as a Baal Shem, Israel, considering his following large enough and his authority established, decided about 1740 to expound his teachings in the shtetl of Medzhybizh and people, mainly from the spiritual elite, came to listen to him. Medzhybizh became the seat of the movement and of the Mezhbizh. His following gradually increased and with it the hostility of the Talmudists. Israel was supported at the beginning of his career by two prominent Talmudists, the brothers Meïr, who were Chief Rabbis of Lemberg and later Ostroh, and author of Meir Netivim and other works, and Isaac Dov Margalios. Later, he won over recognized rabbinic authorities who became his disciples and attested to his scholarship. These include Jacob Joseph of Polonne; Dovid Halperin, rabbi of Ostroha; Israel of Sataniv, author of Tiferet Yisrael; Yoseph Heilperin of Slosowitz; and Dov Ber of Mezeritch. It is chiefly due to the latter that Israel's doctrines (though in an essentially altered form) were introduced into learned Jewish religious circles.
- Israel undertook journeys in which he is recorded as effecting cures and expelling demons and shedim (evil spirits). Later Hasidic tradition downplayed the importance of these healing and magical practices, concentrating on his teachings, charm, magnetism, and ecstatic personality.
- The "Agudas Ohalei Tzadikim" organization (based in Israel) has restored many graves of Tzadikim (Ohelim) in Ukraine, including the Baal Shem Tov's. A guesthouse and synagogue are located next to the Ohel of Baal Shem Tov, and the Baal Shem Tov's synagogue in the village proper has been painstakingly restored. Both synagogues are used by the many visitors from all over the world.
- Israel took sides with the Talmudists in their disputes against Frankism, a Sabbataeanist movement. After the mass conversion of the Frankists to Christianity, the Baal Shem Tov allegedly said that as long as a diseased limb is connected with the body, there is hope that it may be saved; but, once amputated, it is gone, and there is no hope. It is alleged that he died out of grief that the Frankists left Judaism.
- The Besht was a mystic who claimed to have achieved devekut, meaning that his soul could ascend to heaven, speak with any soul there, and intervene between humans and God. His followers believed that could protect the Jewish community from plague and persecution.
- According to legend, he ate farfel every Shabbat evening, because the word is similar to the Yiddish word farfaln "wiped out, over, finished". He considered the noodles a symbol marking the beginning of a new week.
- It was believed the Besht was a great medical practitioner with vast knowledge regarding salves, balms, and similar medicaments. Some aspects of his medical practice are said to have been mystic, though the degree to which this is the case is not agreed upon. Some claim that the Besht could only heal others through prayer, but others describe other mystical methods.
- Israel did not oppose traditional Jewish practices, but the spirit behind them. His teachings resulted from a deep, religious temperament; he stressed the spirit. Though he considered halakha to be holy and inviolable, and he emphasized the importance of Torah-study, he held that one's entire life should be service to God. Hasidic legend tells of a woman whom her relatives sought to kill on account of her shameful life, but who was saved in body and soul by Besht. The story is characteristic of Besht's activity in healing those needing relief. More important to him than prayer was a friendly relationship with sinners. Unselfishness and high-minded benevolence are a motif in the legends about him. Besht's methods of teaching differed from those of his opponents. He directed many satirical remarks at them, a characteristic one being his designation of the typical Talmudist of his day as "a man who through a sheer study of the Law has no time to think about God". Besht is reported to have illustrated his views of asceticism by the following parable:

A thief once tried to break into a house, the owner of which, crying out, frightened the thief away. The same thief soon afterward broke into the house of a very strong man, who, on seeing him enter, kept quite still. When the thief had come near enough, the man caught him and put him in prison, thus depriving him of all opportunity to do further harm.

Israel held a firm conviction that God had entrusted him with a special mission to spread his doctrines. He believed that he had heavenly visions revealing this mission to him. For him, every intuition was a revelation, and divine messages were daily occurrences. An example of the power of his spiritual vision is found at the beginning of his grandson's work, Degel, where he writes that his grandfather wrote to Abraham Gershon of Kitov, who lived in Ottoman Palestine, asking him why he was not there that particular Shabbat.

== Misattributed images ==
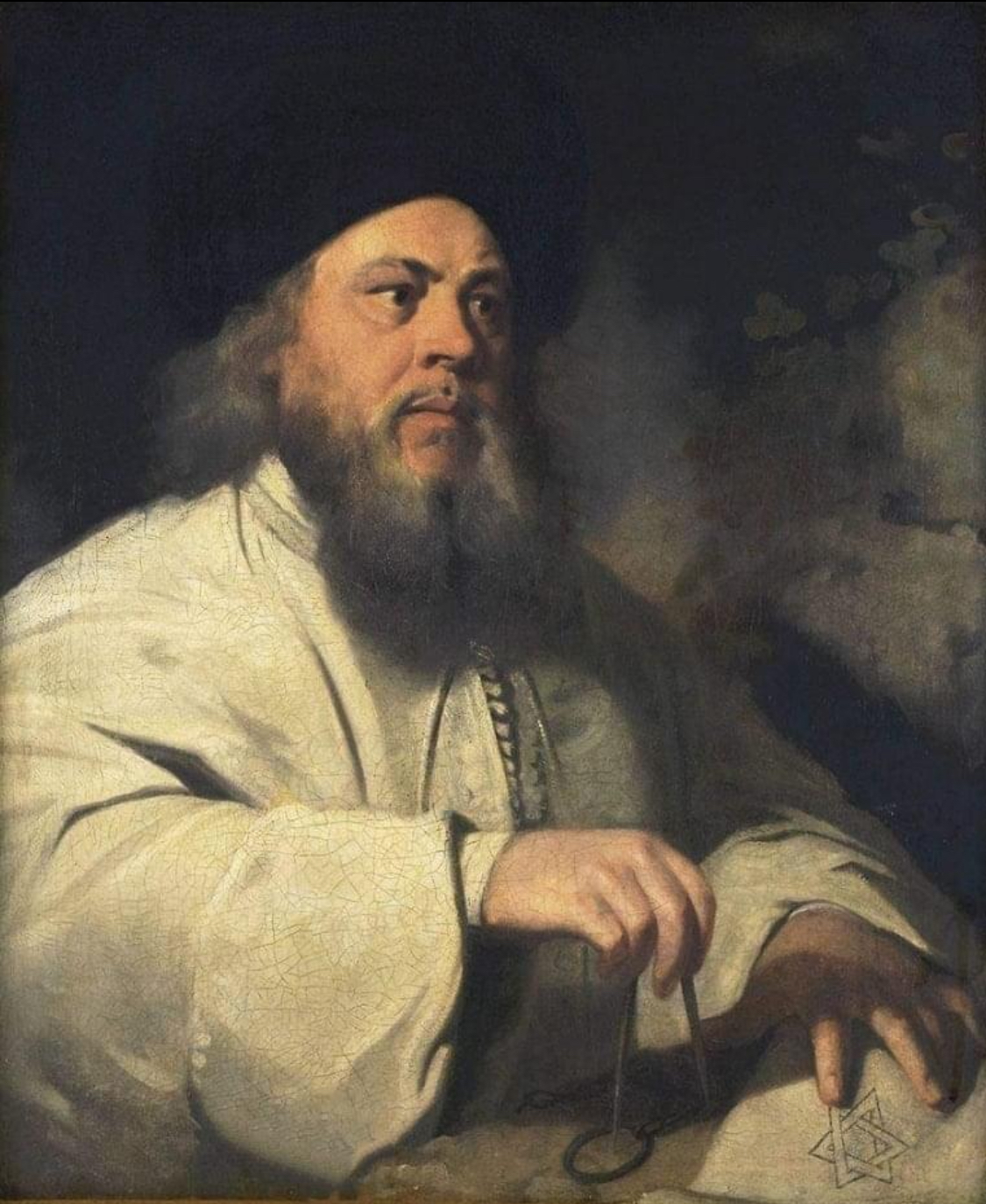
Hayyim Samuel Jacob Falk (the Baal Shem of London)

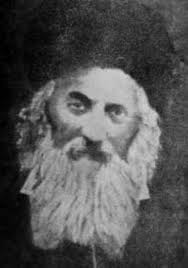
Elijah Guttmacher(1796–1874)

A portrait by John Singleton Copley, often mistaken for the Baal Shem Tov, is a portrait of Hayyim Samuel Jacob Falk, who was known as "the Baal Shem of London". Another popular image is in fact Elijah Guttmacher, the Gradeitzer Rebbe.

== In popular culture ==
In 2019, the American funk quartet The Fearless Flyers released an instrumental single named "The Baal Shem Tov" in honor of the rabbi.

Singer Matisyahu's song Baal Shem Tov on the album Spark Seeker is named after him.

He was portrayed by Luzer Twersky in the Ukrainian film Dovbush (2023).

== Gallery ==
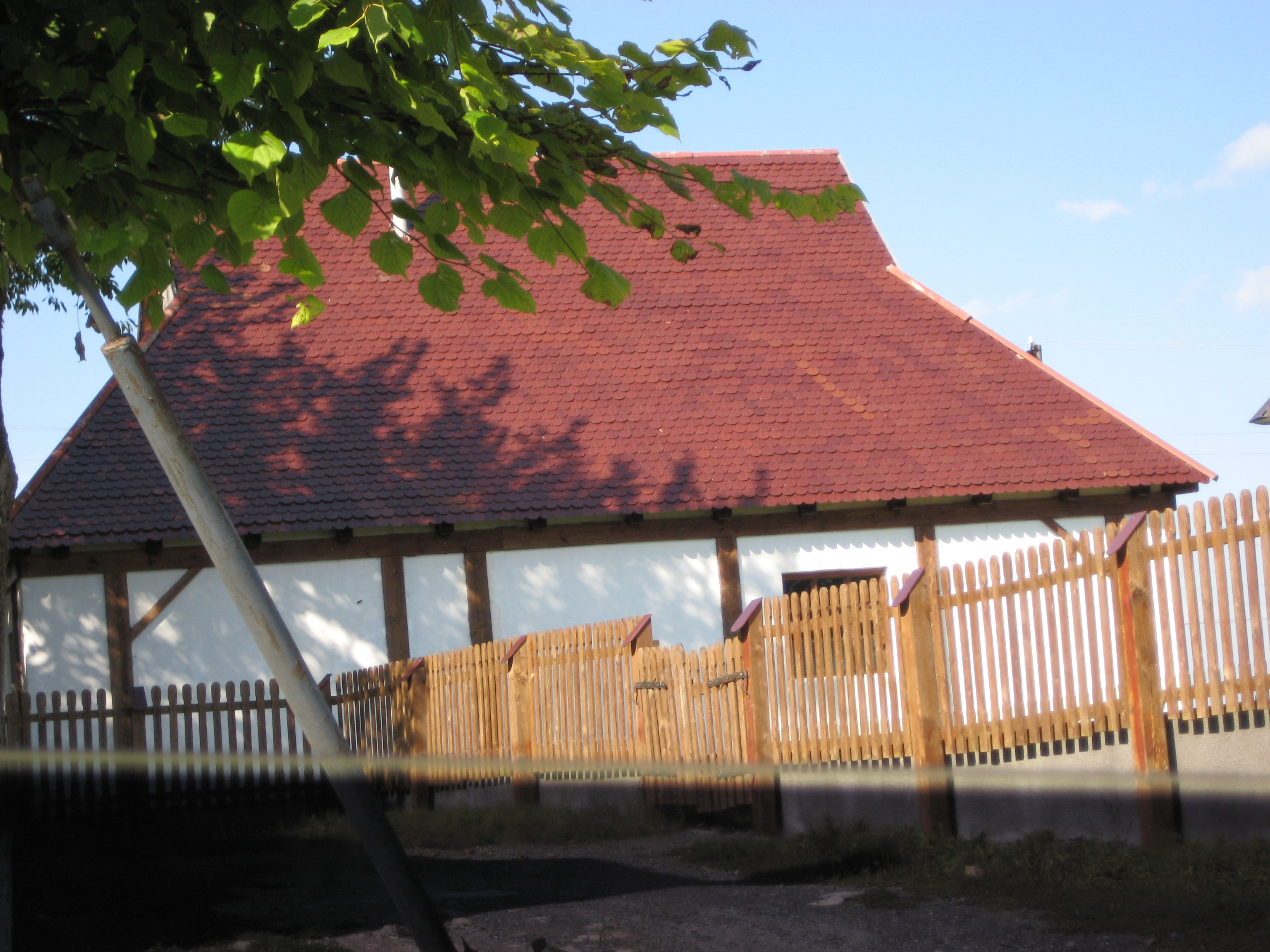
A replica of the old synagogue of Medzhybizh, which was never used by Israel, attracts tourists (August 4, 2008).

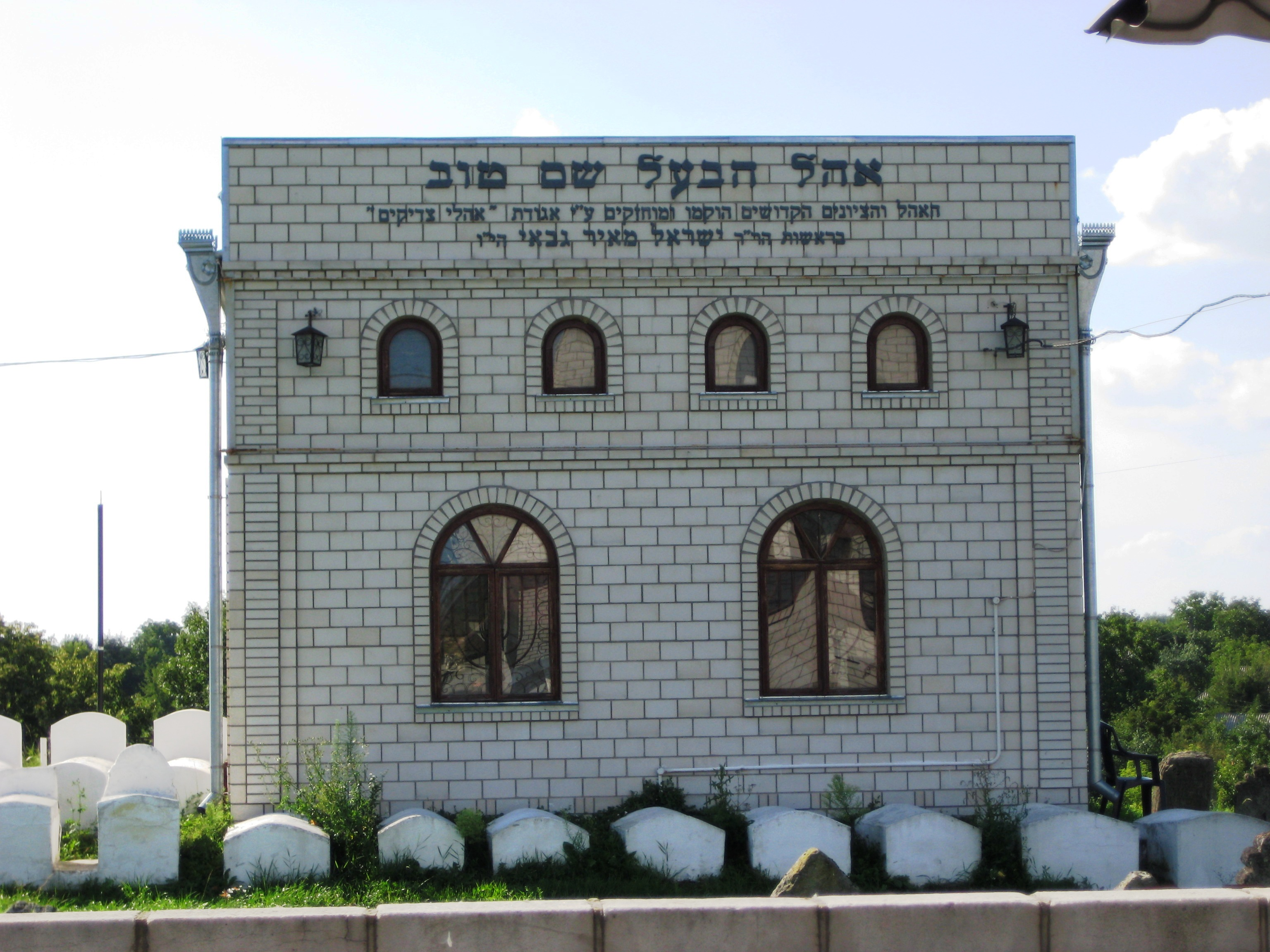
Ohel of Baal Shem Tov; August 4, 2008

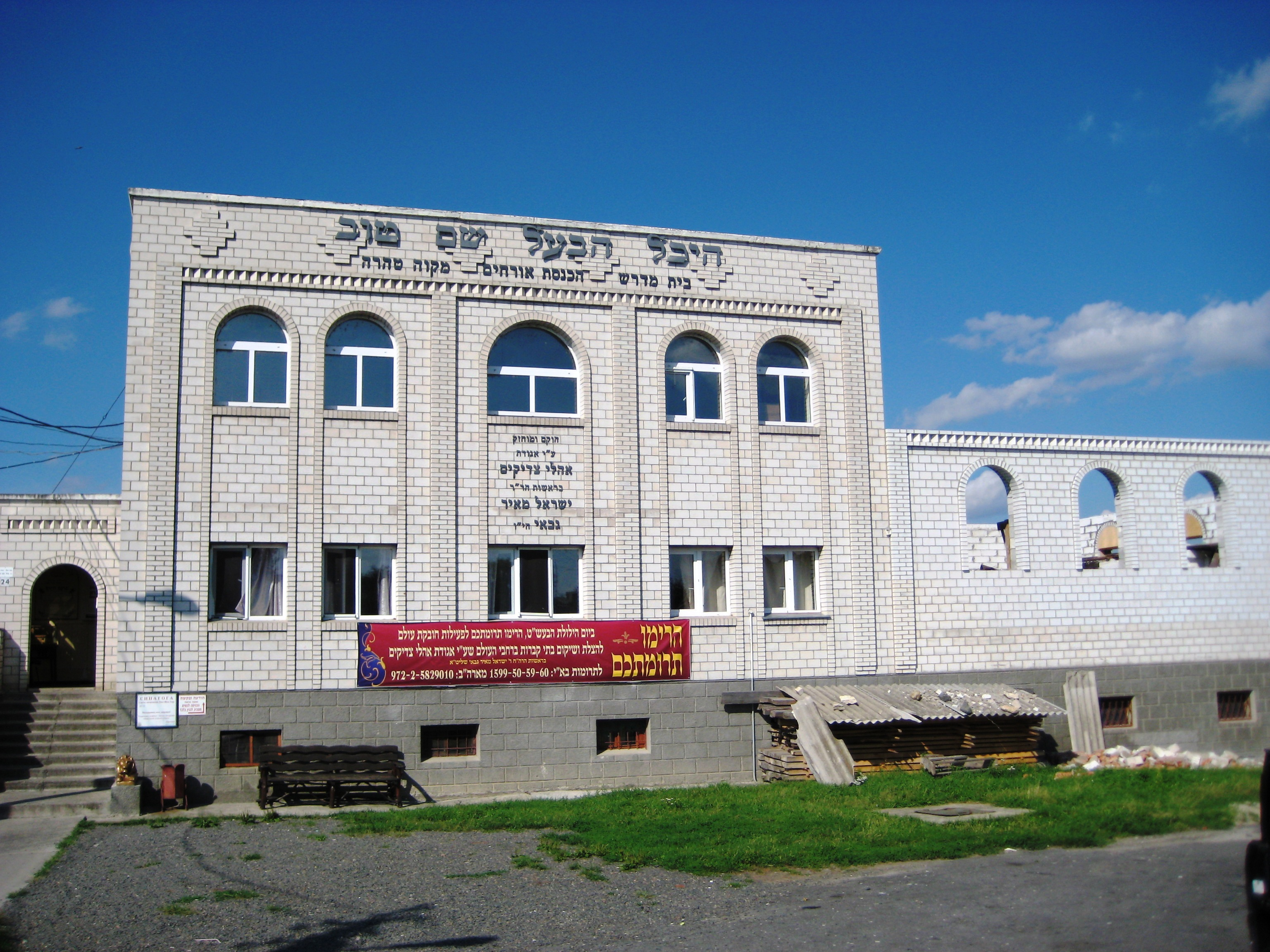
New guesthouse and synagogue next to Ohel of Baal Shem Tov (work in progress); August 4, 2008

== See also ==
- List of Hasidic dynasties
- Hasidim and Mitnagdim
- Tzavaat HaRivash
- Baal Shem Tov family tree
