= Keter Shem Tov =

Literary work by Baal Shem Tov

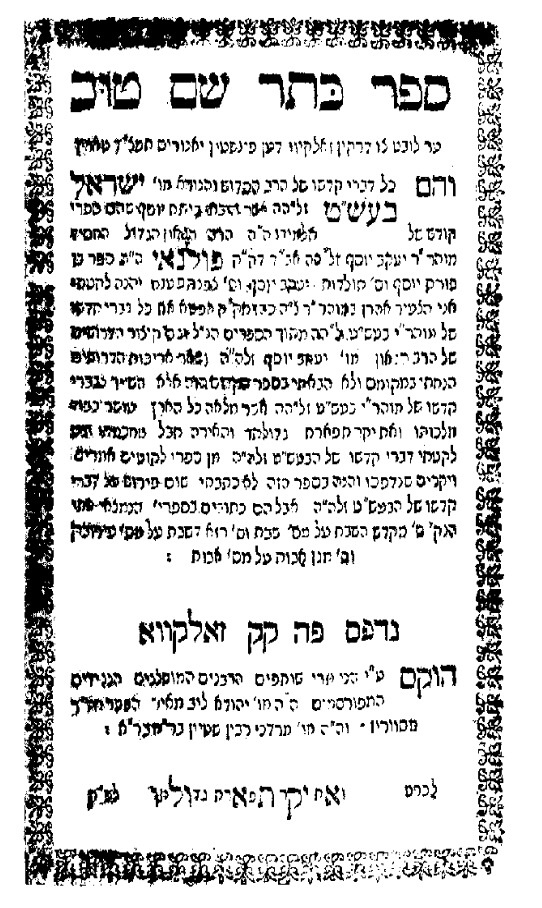
- Title page of Zalkevo edition
- Author: Rabbi Israel Baal Shem Tov
- Language: Hebrew
- Subject: Jewish mysticism, Hasidic philosophy
- Genre: Religion
- Published: First edition, Zalkevo, 1794; Complete edition, Kehot Publication Society, Brooklyn, 2004
- Media type: Print
- Pages: 4336
- ISBN: 978-0826654557

Keter Shem Tov (Hebrew: כתר שם טוב, "The Crown of the Good Name") was the first published work of the teachings of Rabbi Israel Baal Shem Tov, the founder of Hasidism. The book was published in Zalkevo, 1794, more than thirty years after Rabbi Israel's passing. The book contains numerous, but brief, Hasidic interpretations of the Torah (Hebrew Bible).

The Chabad-Lubavitch Hasidic movement has republished the work in a number of new editions.

== Teachings ==
In Keter Shem Tov, the Baal Shem Tov stresses the importance and esteem placed on the recital of Psalms.

== Quotes ==
- "A mashal (parable) is a vessel for the pure enlightenment of the mind"

== Publishing ==
A complete edition of Keter Shem Tov (titled Keter Shem Tov Hasholeim) was published by the Chabad publishing house, Kehot Publication Society, in 2004. The new edition was edited and annotated by Rabbi Jacob Immanuel Schochet who recompiled the collection and added annotations, footnotes, cross references and textual corrections. A Paraphrased Translation of Keter Shem Tov including the Additions Added (collected from the writing of the Chabad Rebbes) by Rabbi Immanuel Schochet was released by Rabbi Zevi Wineberg. in July. 2020.
