= Tzavaat HaRivash =

Book of teachings from the Baal Shem Tov

- Author: Attributed to Baal Shem Tov and Dov Ber of Mezeritch
- Original title: צוואת הריב"ש
- Language: Hebrew
- Genre: Hasidic philosophy; Jewish mysticism
- Media type: Print

Tzavaat HaRivash (Hebrew: צוואת הריב"ש, "Testament of the Rabbi Yisroel Baal Shem") is a book of collected teachings from the Baal Shem Tov regarding Divine service, personal refinement, and understanding the Divine. The title of the book is derived from the opening words of its first teaching. The work was not penned by the Baal Shem Tov himself, but rather compiled by his disciples and followers.

== Teachings ==
=== Subduing physical desires and the evil inclination ===
The book calls for a high degree of self-mastery. In repeated instances, the Baal Shem Tov urges constant attachment to the Divine and separation from unnecessary physical matters. Even when involved with worldly affairs, one should consider the higher worlds to be his true home and long to return there as soon as the necessary business is finished. Although the book was written for those who still felt attachment to physical desires, it teaches that one should strive to distance oneself from them to the point of being actually disgusted by them.

=== Avoiding pride ===
Tzavaat HaRivash considers pride to be an evil trait: "If one sees that his [Divine] service is greater than that of his fellow, he should not become proud, Heaven forbid! As it says in Otiot DeRabi Akiva, 'Let him not say in his heart, "I am greater than my fellow" ' " (Teaching 48). A way to avoid this is to constantly be involved with Divine service at every single moment, so that there is no time to become proud (Teaching 52).

One possible source of pride is Torah study itself, because there is a danger that the evil inclination will tell him to learn the detailed laws, but in such a way as to avoid fear of Heaven (Teaching 117). To counteract this, one should interrupt his Torah study, rest a little and meditate every hour in order to reattach oneself to G‑d (Teaching 39).

=== Prayer ===
The Baal Shem Tov attached extremely high importance to daily prayer. In line with his belief that one should serve G‑d "with all his power" (Teaching 3), he considered it "a great kindness from G‑d, may He be blessed, that a man lives after prayer, because according to the ways of nature, he should have died from expending his strength in prayer" (Teaching 35 and 57, also see 42). Nevertheless, prayer should be recited quietly (Teaching 33).

Because prayer takes so much energy, the Baal Shem Tov discouraged reciting too many psalms before the main body of prayer, out of fear that one might deplete his strength to the point that he cannot complete the required part of the daily service. Rather, additional psalms and the Song of Songs should be recited afterwards, if he still has strength (Teaching 38).

When praying, one is to either look in the siddur or to close one's eyes. The Baal Shem Tov teaches that looking at the letters themselves helps to improve concentration when one is on a lower level of inspiration. When one is cleaving to the higher worlds, however, it is better to close the eyes to maintain the inspiration (Teaching 40).

=== Being joyful and avoiding depression ===
Tzavaat HaRivash on several occasions stresses that one should avoid sadness as much as possible, because this is a ploy by the evil inclination to cause one to stop serving G‑d (Teachings 44–46). On the contrary, one should serve G‑d with joy (Teaching 45 and 46, cf. Psalms 100:2). In particular, prayer is much greater and more potent amidst joy than in sadness and crying (Teaching 107). Further, a son's intense love and joy has the power to dispel his father's anger; the same is true with Israel and G‑d (Teaching 132).

=== Constant Divine connection ===
The book also teaches that one must constantly think about holy things (Teaching 81). "Even when going to the lavatory, he should think, 'Am I not separating bad from good?'... And when one goes to sleep, one should think, 'My mind (mochin) will go to the blessed Holy One and be strengthened for His service, may He be blessed.' " (Teaching 22)

== Accuracy ==
Rabbi Schneur Zalman of Liadi was a contemporary of the Baal Shem Tov and a student of his foremost pupil, the Maggid of Mezritch. He writes that while Tzavaat HaRivash was written in Hebrew, the Baal Shem Tov actually didn't teach in Hebrew but rather in Yiddish. Also, those who compiled the Baal Shem Tov's teachings "did not know how to determine the phraseology exactly in its proper fashion." Rabbi Schneur Zalman in fact takes issue with a certain word in Tzavaat HaRivash (sharta, dwelled, in the context of the descent of the Shechinah) and asserts that the Baal Shem Tov actually meant nitlavsha, "clothed Itself" (in a state of exile, as opposed to dwelling there as in a home). Nevertheless, he affirms that "the connotation is absolutely true."

Over time, textual variants appeared among the manuscripts. Sometimes the changes were very small differences in individual words. Other times, new material (sometimes attributed to the Maggid of Mezeritch or other students of the Baal Shem Tov) was inserted, yielding more information.
