= Okopy, Ternopil Oblast =

Village in Chortkiv Raion, Ukraine

Okopy Окопи
- Village
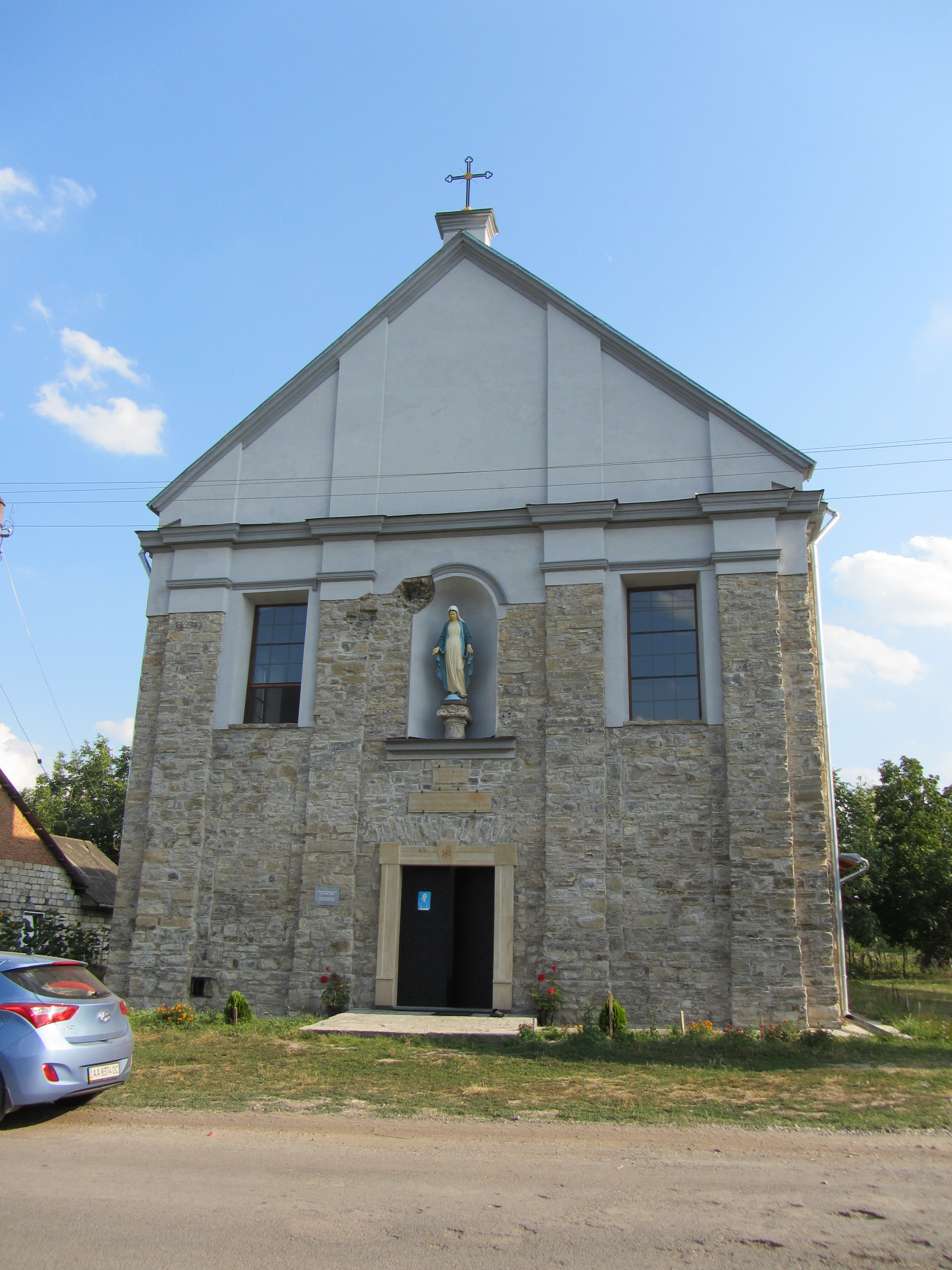
- Interactive map of Okopy
- Coordinates: 48°32′N 26°25′E
- Country: Ukraine
- Oblast: Ternopil
- Established: 1692

Area
  - Total: 1.541 km^{2} (0.595 sq mi)

Population
  - Total: 1,880

Okopy (Ukrainian: Окопи) is a selo in western Ukraine. It is located in Chortkiv Raion (district) of Ternopil Oblast (province), and had its origins as a Polish fortress at the meeting of the Zbruch and Dniester rivers. It belongs to Melnytsia-Podilska settlement hromada, one of the hromadas of Ukraine.

The current estimated population is around 557 (as of 2005).

== Name ==
The settlement was previously referred to as Okopy Svyatoyi Triytsi (Ukrainian: Окопи Святої Трійці; Polish: Okopy Świętej Trójcy; Russian: Окопы Святой Троицы), translated as the Trenches of the Holy Trinity. This name came from the fact that the fortress for the town was entrenched on the top of the mountain.

== History ==
The stronghold and the neighbouring town were built in 1692, by Stanisław Jan Jabłonowski, Grand Hetman of the Crown. The site was chosen by King Jan III Sobieski of Poland, as a measure to stop a possible attack from the nearby Turkish-seized fortresses of Kamieniec Podolski, twenty kilometers away, and Chocim, eight kilometers away. The fortress was expanded by Tylman of Gameren, one of the most notable Polish architects of the time.

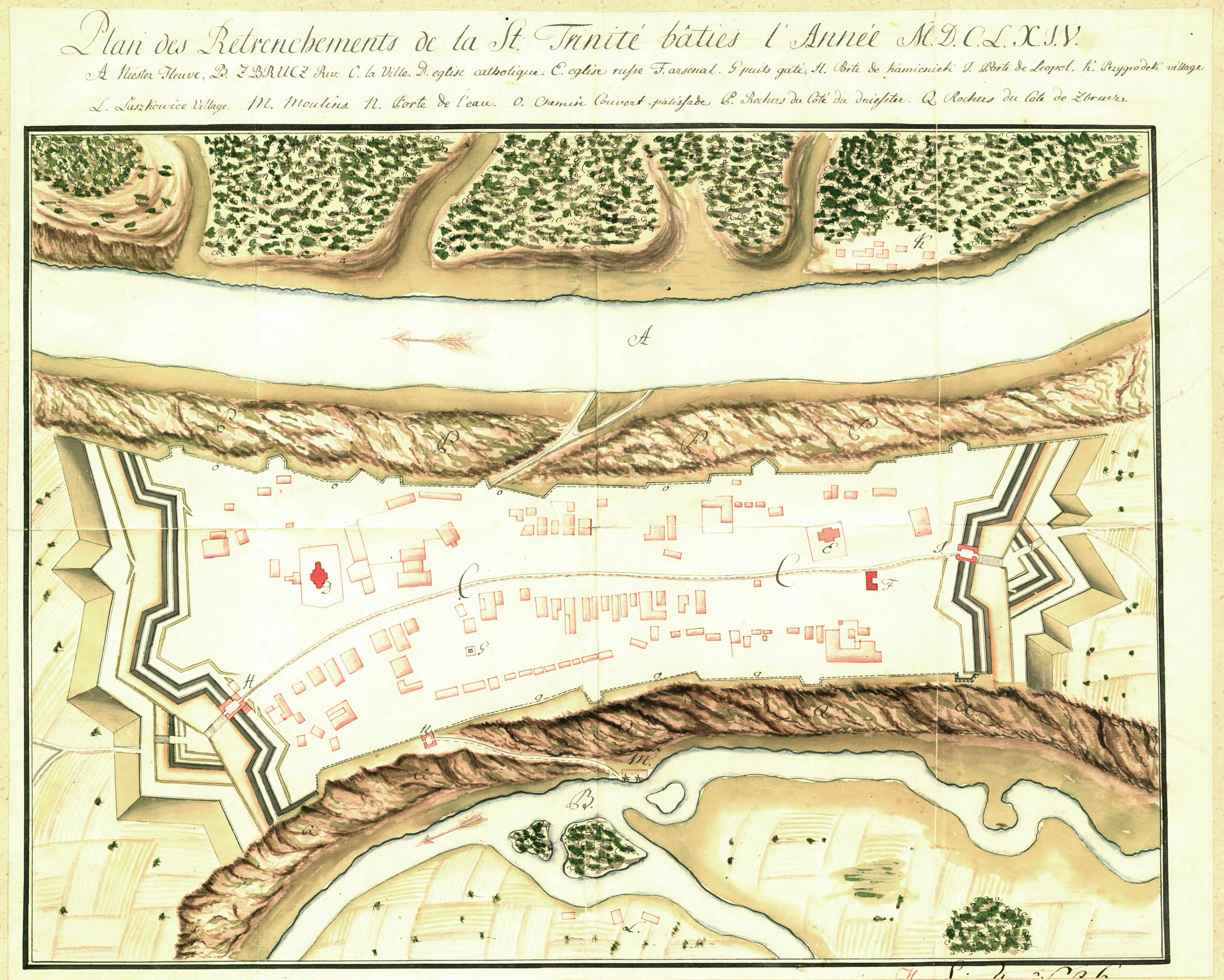
Plan and map of the fortress of Okopy. The map was drawn in 1664.

The site is a natural fortress: a small strip of high rocks linking the Zbruch and Dnister rivers. Tylman of Gameren decided to build a double line of fortifications (two rampart lines of bastion system) with two gates leading east- (Kamieniec Gate) and westwards (Lwów Gate). Other directions were defended by towered walls and natural escarpments over the river banks, with walls stretching along both sides of isthmus on the edge of steep slope to the river. The construction was started under the command of the General of Horse Artillery, Marcin Katski, and the works were finished in the same year. The nearby village was also fortified. In 1693 Jan III Sobieski built a votive church in the compound. Israel ben Eliezer, a Jewish mystical rabbi and the founder of the Hasidic Jewish movement, was born in Okopy in 1698 (although he later lived in nearby Tluste).

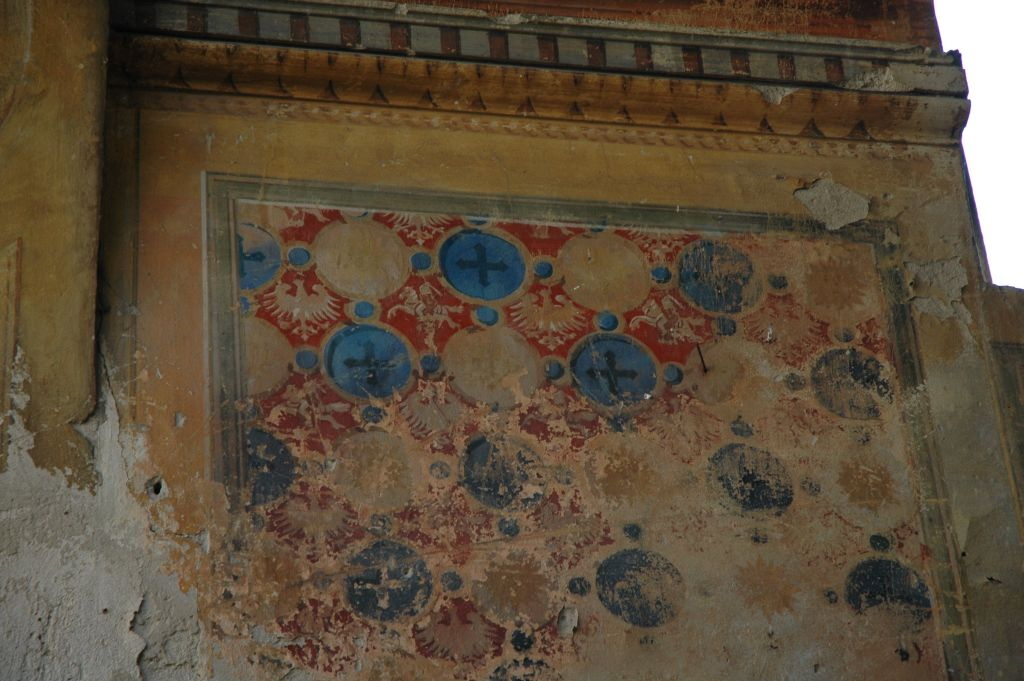
Decoration of a church in Okopy showing the coats of arms of Poland and Lithuania. Decoration made in polychromy.

The stronghold was abandoned in 1699, when the rest of Podolia was returned to Poland, and the fortress lost its importance as a counterbalance to Kamieniec Podolski. In 1769, the Bar Confederacy, defended the stronghold against the besieging forces of Russia. The defence was commanded by the future Hero of the American Revolutionary War, Kazimierz Pułaski.

After the Partitions of Poland in 1772, the village and the ruins of the stronghold became the easternmost point of Austrian Galicia. The nearby town was abandoned, and the inhabitants of the village moved inside the fortress walls. Most of the houses that were built were made from the stones that had been used to construct the earlier defensive walls. The remaining parts of the stronghold (both gates, one of the forts, the ruins of the Holy Trinity church and parts of the walls) were partially restored in 1905 by count Mieczysław Dunin-Borkowski.

After the Polish-Bolshevik War of 1920, the site was made part of Poland, in the Tarnopol Voivodship, near the Polish border with the Soviet Union and Romania. The 14th battalion of the Border Defence Corps were stationed there. In the interbellum, the village was known for its wineries and peach orchards. It became a holidays center for the inhabitants of the nearby cities of Ternopil, and Lviv.

After the World War II, the site was annexed by the Soviet Union. The village was renamed "Okopy" and was turned into a Kolkhoz, and soon totally depopulated, as a result of the forced migration of Poles to Siberia.

The ruins of the stronghold can be found in the western part of the village.

The name of the fortress was popularized in Poland by Zygmunt Krasiński's usage of it in his drama Nie-Boska komedia (The Un-divine Comedy,1835).

Until 18 July 2020, Okopy belonged to Borshchiv Raion. The raion was abolished in July 2020 as part of the administrative reform of Ukraine, which reduced the number of raions of Ternopil Oblast to three. The area of Borshchiv Raion was merged into Chortkiv Raion.

== Legend ==
Not far from Okopy, on the Dniester River, lies the well-known village of Ataky. The names of the two villages have an amusing double meaning in Ukrainian: Okopy literally means “trenches,” while Ataky means “attacks.” Their close proximity gave rise, as early as the First World War, to a local saying about a soldier who:

«During attacks, I stayed in Okopy; and when they were digging trenches, I ran off to Ataky».

== Notable people ==
- Baal Shem Tov, founder of the 18th century Hasidic movement
