= Leon Schiller =

Polish director, critic and theatre theoretician

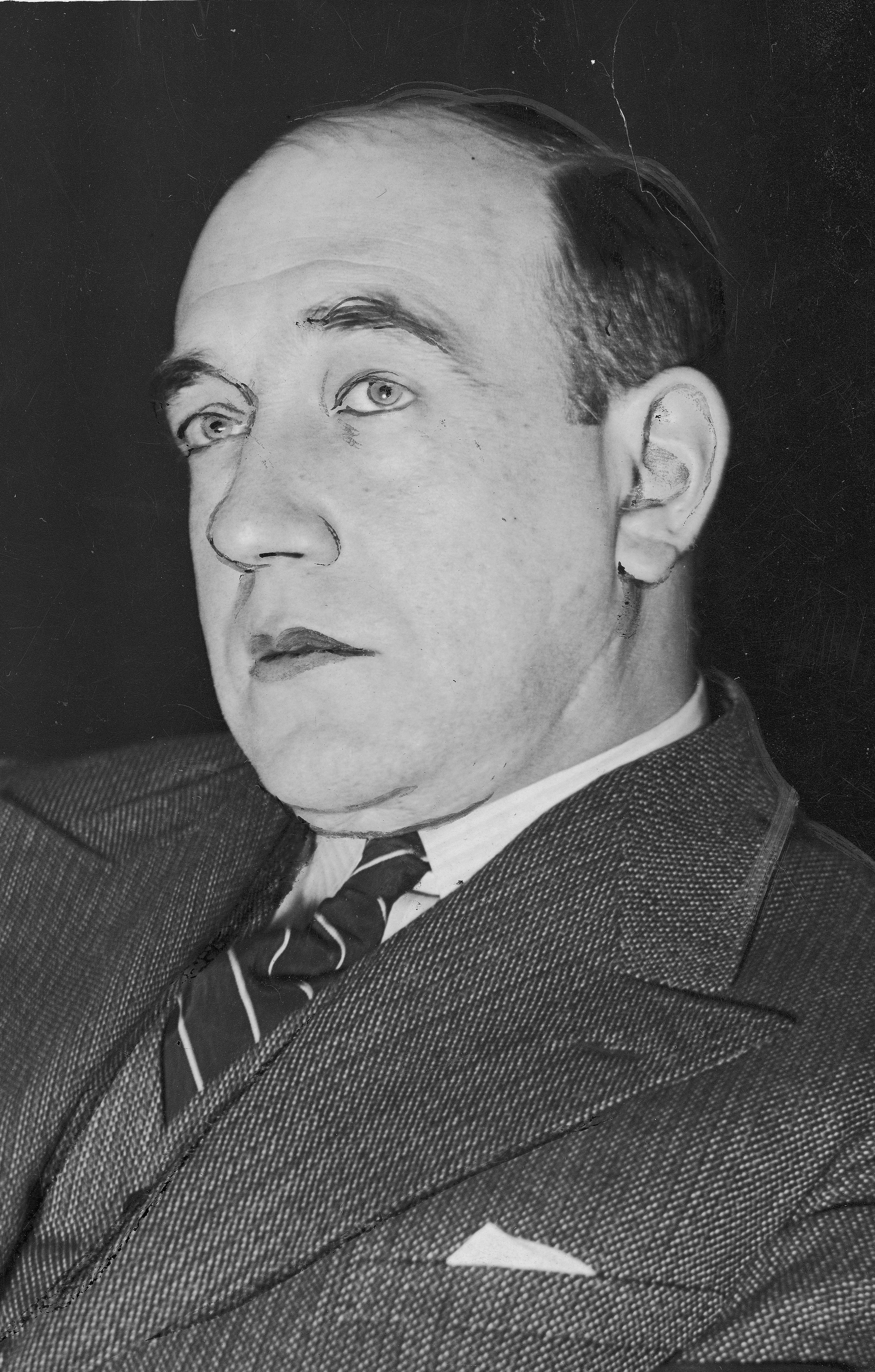
- Schiller in 1931
- Born: Leon Jerzy Wojciech Schiller de Schildenfeld; 14 March 1887; Kraków, Kingdom of Galicia and Lodomeria, Austria-Hungary
- Died: 25 March 1954 (aged 67); Warsaw, Polish People's Republic
- Known for: Theatre

Leon Schiller or Leon Schiller de Schildenfeld (14 March 1887 – 25 March 1954) was a Polish theatre and film director, as well as critic and theatre theoretician. He also wrote theatre and radio screenplays and composed music. He was born in Kraków under the Austrian rule during the foreign Partitions of Poland, to a family of Jewish and Austrian origin that had been ennobled by Empress Maria Theresa.

Schiller became famous for his 1934 staging of Adam Mickiewicz's Dziady at Warsaw's Teatr Polski (Polish Theatre). This was also presented in Lwów (now Lviv; 1932), Wilno (now Vilnius; 1933) as well as in Sofia in Bulgaria (1937).

== Career ==
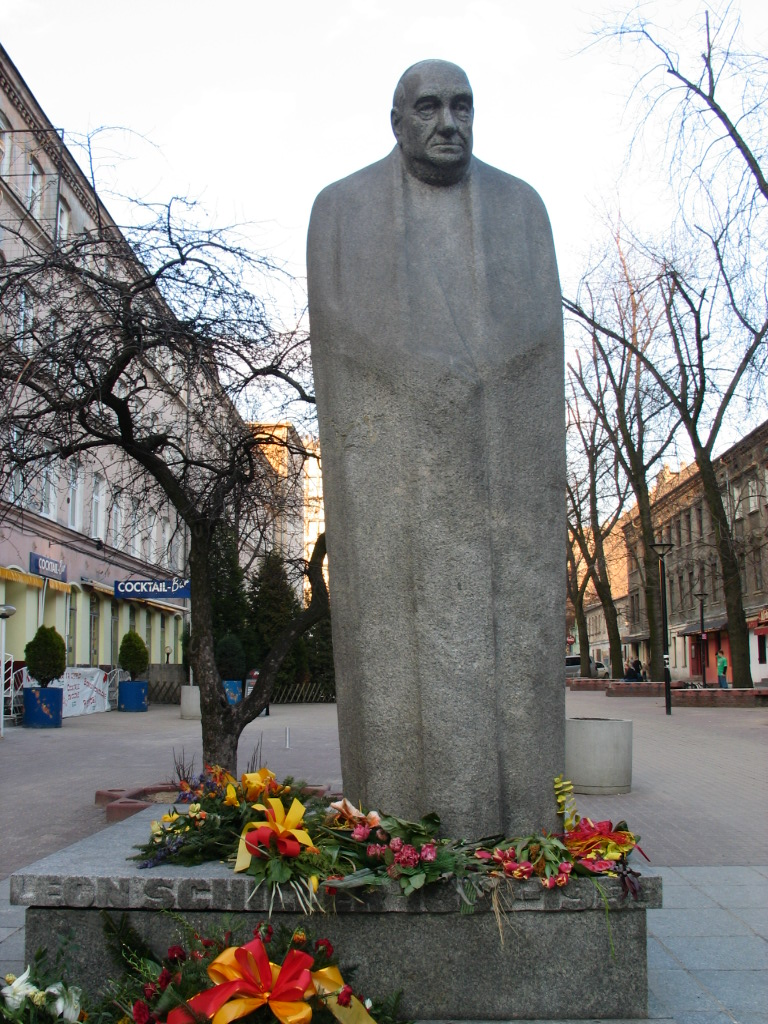
Schiller statue in Łódź, Poland

Schiller graduated from Kraków's Jagiellonian University in philosophy and Polish literature. He also studied at the Sorbonne in Paris. He debuted as a singer in Kraków's Zielony Balonik (Green Balloon) cabaret (1906) and as theater director in Warsaw's Polish Theatre (Teatr Polski, 1917). He served as artistic director of the Ateneum Theatre (1932–34), raising its reputation as one of the leading voices for Poland's new intelligentsia in the interwar period. Schiller collaborated with the following Warsaw theatres:

- Teatr Wielki (Great Theater)
- Teatr Rozmaitości (Variety Theater in Warsaw)
- Teatr Mały (Little Theater)
- Teatr Polski (Polish Theater)
- Teatr Reduta (Redoubt Theater)
- Teatr Ateneum (Ateneum Theatre).

He also collaborated with theaters in Łódź and Lwów (now Lviv). From 1930 to 1932, he was artistic and drama director of Warsaw's Wielki (Great), Rozmaitości (Variety), and Mały (Little) Theaters. In Lwów he developed his own concept of "monumental theatre," pertaining to the production of great Romantic works: Kordian (1930), Dziady (Forefathers' Eve, 1932) and Sen Srebrny Salomei (Salomea's Silver Dream, 1932). Schiller's connection with Lwów lasted sporadically until 1939.

His directorial work included 29 dramas and some dozen vaudeville and operetta productions. In 1933 he headed the directorial department at the National Theater Arts Institute.

On 29 June 1908 Schiller initiated a correspondence with the English actor, theater director, scenic designer, and theoretician of drama, Edward Gordon Craig. Together with his letter Schiller sent Craig, in Florence, his essay, "Dwa teatry" ("Two Theaters"), translated into English by Madeline Meager. Craig responded immediately, accepting the essay for his international theater magazine, The Mask. This was the beginning of a productive collaboration between the two prominent theater directors, who introduced each other's theoretical writings to foreign readers.

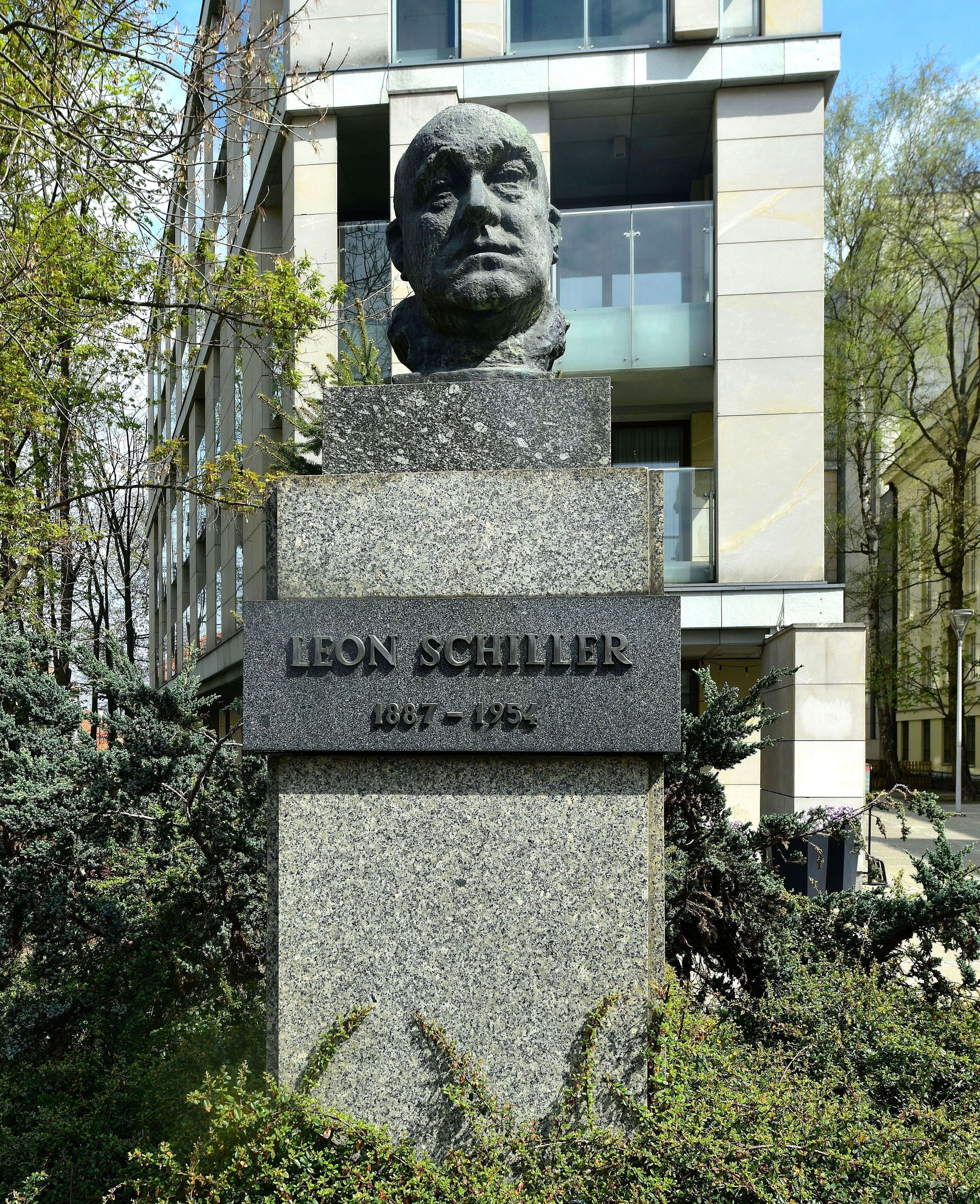
Bust of Leon Schiller near Warsaw's Teatr Polski

=== World War II ===
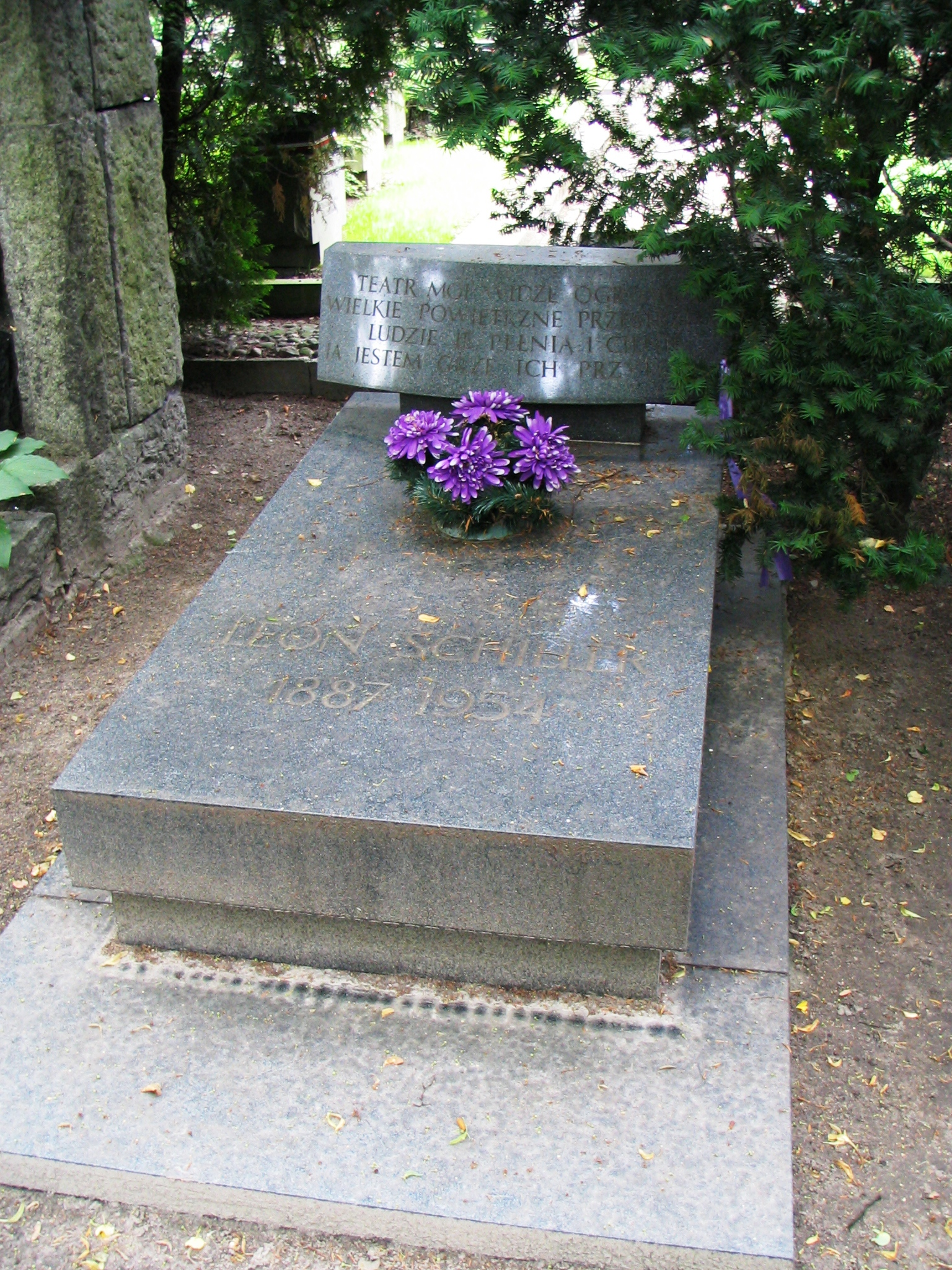
Schiller's grave, Powązki Cemetery, Warsaw

During World War II, as part of German repressive measures after the Volksdeutsch German-collaborator actor Igo Sym had been shot dead by the Polish underground (7 March 1941), Schiller was imprisoned at the Pawiak prison and at Auschwitz-Birkenau. In May 1941 he was ransomed by his sister, Anna Jackowska, with 12,000 złotys that she received for her jewelry.

After the war, in 1946–49, Schiller was president of the National Drama School in Łódź (Państwowa Wyższa Szkoła Teatralna w Łodzi). In 1952 he founded the publication, Pamiętnik Teatralny (The Theater Memoir).

He died in 1954, aged 66, in Warsaw.

== Works ==
Essays:

- Teatr Ogromny (Monumental Theater), 1961
- U progu nowego teatru (On the Threshold of the New Theater), 1978

Performance scripts:

- Pastorałka (Pastorale), 1931
- Kram z piosenkami (A Market Booth of Songs), 1977

"Monumental" productions:

- Samuel Zborowski, 1927
- Kordian, 1934
- Dziady, 1934
- Nie-Boska Komedia (The Un-Divine Comedy), 1938

Zeittheater - productions on current social issues:

- Opera za trzy grosze (The Three-Penny Opera), 1929
- Krzyczcie Chiny (Cry, China!), 1938
- Kapitan z Koepenick (The Captain from Koepenick), 1932

Musicals:

- Dawne Czasy w Piosence, Poezji i Zwyczajach (Old Times in Song, Poetry and Custom), 1924
- Bandurka (Bandora), 1925
- Kulig (Sleigh Ride), 1929

== See also ==
- List of Poles
