= Harold B. Segel =

American literature professor

Harold Bernard Segel (September 13, 1930 – March 16, 2016) was professor emeritus of Slavic literatures and of comparative literature at Columbia University.

Segel was born in Boston, Massachusetts, and attended Boston Latin School. He majored in Modern Languages at Boston College (BS, 1951) and did graduate work at Harvard University (PhD, 1955).

== Works ==
- The Literature of Eighteenth-Century Russia: A History and Anthology (1967)
- The Major Comedies of Alexander Fredro (1969)
- The Baroque Poem: A Comparative Survey (1974)
- Twentieth-Century Russian Drama from Gorky to the Present (1979)
- Turn-of the-Century Cabaret: Berlin, Munich, Paris, Barcelona, Vienna, Krakow, St. Petersburg, Moscow, and Zurich (1987)
- Renaissance Culture in Poland. The Rise of Humanism, 1470–1543 (1989)
- The Vienna Coffeehouse Wits 1890-1938 (1995)
- Pinocchio's Progeny : Puppets, Marionettes, Automatons, and Robots in Modernist and Avant-Garde Drama (1995)
- Death of Tarelkin and Other Plays: The Trilogy of Alexander Sukhovo Kobylin (1996) editor
- Stranger in Our Midst: Images of the Jew in Polish Literature (1996) editor
- Egon Erwin Kisch, the Raging Reporter (1997)
- Polish Romantic Drama: Three Plays in English Translation (1997) editor
- Body Ascendant: Modernism and the Physical Imperative (1998)
- The Columbia Guide to the Literature of Eastern Europe Since 1945 (2003)
