= Okopy Castle =

Castle in Okopy, Ternopil Oblast, Ukraine

- Окопівський замок
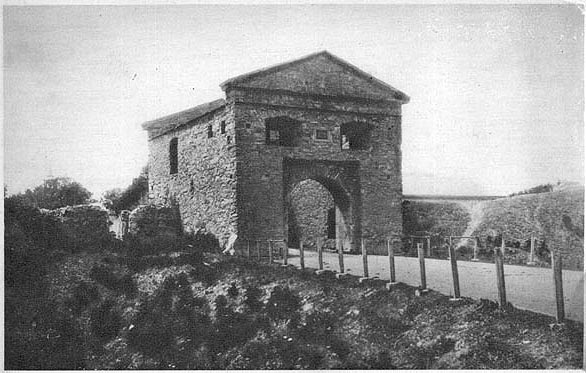
- Kamianetska Gate of the 19th century

General information
- Location: Okopy, Chortkiv Raion, Ternopil Oblast, Ukraine
- Coordinates: 48°32′24.1″N 26°25′01.0″E

Immovable Monument of National Significance of Ukraine
- Official name: Фортеця Трійці (руїни) (мур.) (Trinity Fortress (ruins) (stone))
- Type: Architecture
- Reference no.: 190093

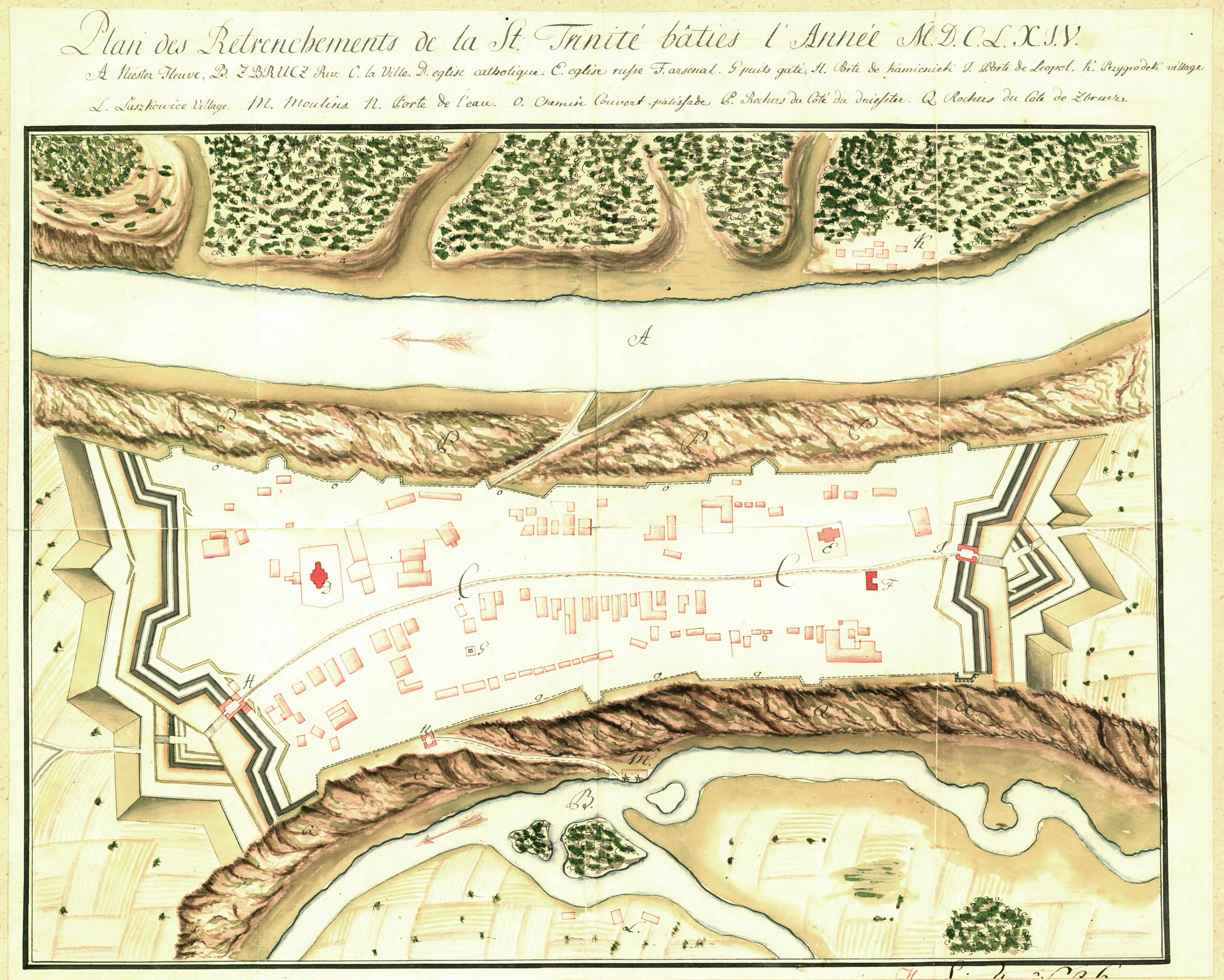
A plan of the fortress

The Okopy Castle (Ukrainian: Окопівський замок, romanized: Okopivs'kyi zamok), also locally known as Holy Trinity Trenches (Ukrainian: Фортеця Святої Трійці, romanized: Fortetsya Svyatoyi Triytsi) is located in Okopy, Ternopil Oblast, Ukraine. The bastion fortress on the Dniester River, at the mouth of the Zbruch River, founded in 1692 by Hetman Stanisław Jan Jabłonowski, built to a design by Tylman van Gameren. The trenches were intended to block communication of the Ottoman garrison of Kamianets-Podilskyi, located 23 kilometers away, with Moldavia, from where convoys of supplies for Kamianets set out. The fortress of the Holy Trinity Trenches lost its military significance after the Treaty of Karlowitz (1699), as a result of which the Polish-Lithuanian Commonwealth regained Kamianets-Podilskyi. It is an architectural monument of national significance.

== History ==
In 1664, General Marcin Kazimierz Kątski erected a fortress on his estate according to a design by French architect Guillaume Le Vasseur de Beauplan. On 25 March 1692, construction of the fortress began. Its purpose, together with the fortress of the Virgin Mary's Sconce, located 43 kilometers to the west, was to hold in check the Turkish forces stationed in Khotyn, 6.5 kilometers away, and Kamianets-Podilskyi (18.5 kilometers away), which they captured in 1672. This purpose is confirmed by referring to it as the "Kamieniec blockade on Mount Holy Trinity". It was conceived and founded by the Great Hetman of the Crown Stanislaw Jan Jablonowski, who drew John III Sobieski's attention to the convenient location for its construction, where the Zbruch flows into the Dniester. The Holy Trinity trenches were designed by Tylman of Gameren, and construction was directed by Crown Artillery General Marcin Kątski.

The western line of fortifications consisted of two half-bastions and the Lvivska Gate located between them, additionally reinforced with a ravelin. The eastern line of fortifications consisted of a bastion and two half-bastions, the Kamianetska Gate was located there, also secured by a ravelin.

Hetman Jablonowski in 1692 determined the composition of the Okopy garrison and appointed garrison commanders. The foreign enlisted troops were commanded by oberszter Michał Brandt with 11 companies of arquebusiers, 1,500 infantry soldiers and 100 dragoons. A separate commander was appointed for the nation's riding units, who became a Halych cup-bearer and former regimentarz Jakub Kalinowski, commanding 18 flags (13 armored and 5 Wallachian). A total of about 4,000 soldiers and 18 cannons were to be located in Okopy. In September 1693, Kalinowski's was replaced for a time by Chomentowski, an ensign of the armored flag of the Halych cup-bearer, and from October 1693 by Konstanty Zahorowski, a Novgorod stolnik, regimental of the JKM. Changes in the composition of the cavalry group stationed in Okopy were brought about by the construction of a new Polish fortification on the line of the Dniester River – the Virgin Mary's Sconce on the Okopy outpost at the end of August 1693, where 3 armored and 1 Wallachian flags under the command of Lieutenant Mikołaj Tyszkowski left. Due to the difficult conditions of service, it was assumed from the beginning that the service of the seconded comrades in the fortress was to last about a year, and then they were to be replaced by other soldiers. The incentive for service was to be double hibernium (a supplement to the pay). In 1699, the fortress lost more military significance as a result of the recapture of Kamianets-Podilskyi.

On 18 September 1699, a thanksgiving mass was celebrated here, attended by crowds of exiles from Podolia and Kamianets, who were returning to their lands after 27 years.

In 1700, King August II town privileges rights to the settlement near the fortress, as well as the privilege of holding fairs.

On 8 March 1769, during the Bar Confederation, Casimir Pulaski defended himself there against Russian attacks. After a three-hour defense, which cost the lives of 200 defenders, Pulaski left the fortress with some soldiers and crossed the Dniester River, saving his life. Some of the soldiers died in the rubble of the burned church, defending themselves to the end, and some were taken prisoner.

The KOP Watchtower "Holy Trinity Trenches" – the basic organizational unit of the Border Protection Corps performing protective service on the Polish-Soviet border and the Polish-Romanian border.

== Holy Trinity Trenches in literature ==
In Zygmunt Krasiński's The Undivine Comedy, the name "Okopy Świętej Trójcy" was used to describe the last outpost of the aristocracy.

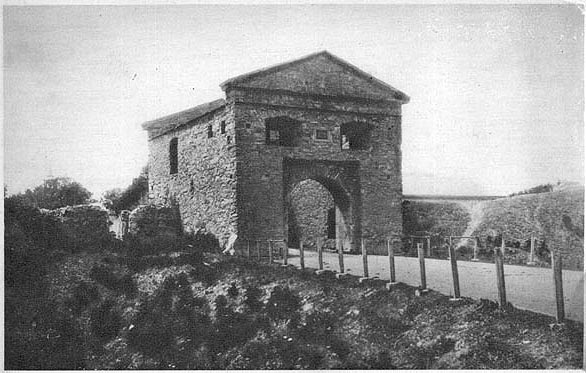
Kamianetska Gate, 19th century

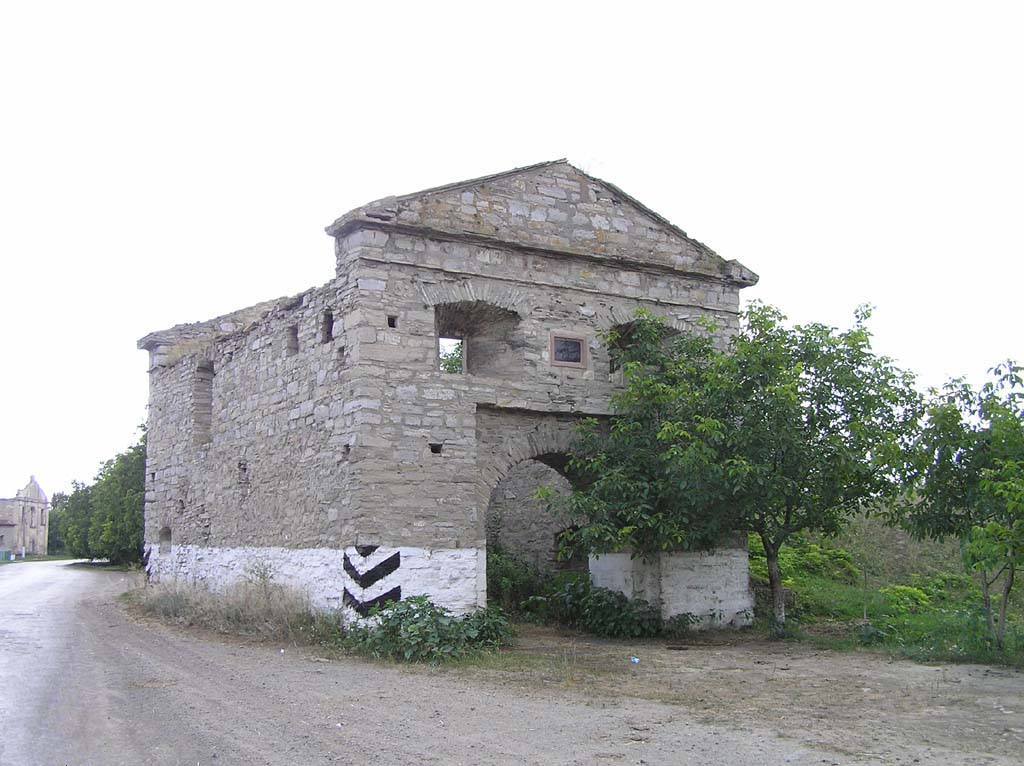
Kamianetska Gate

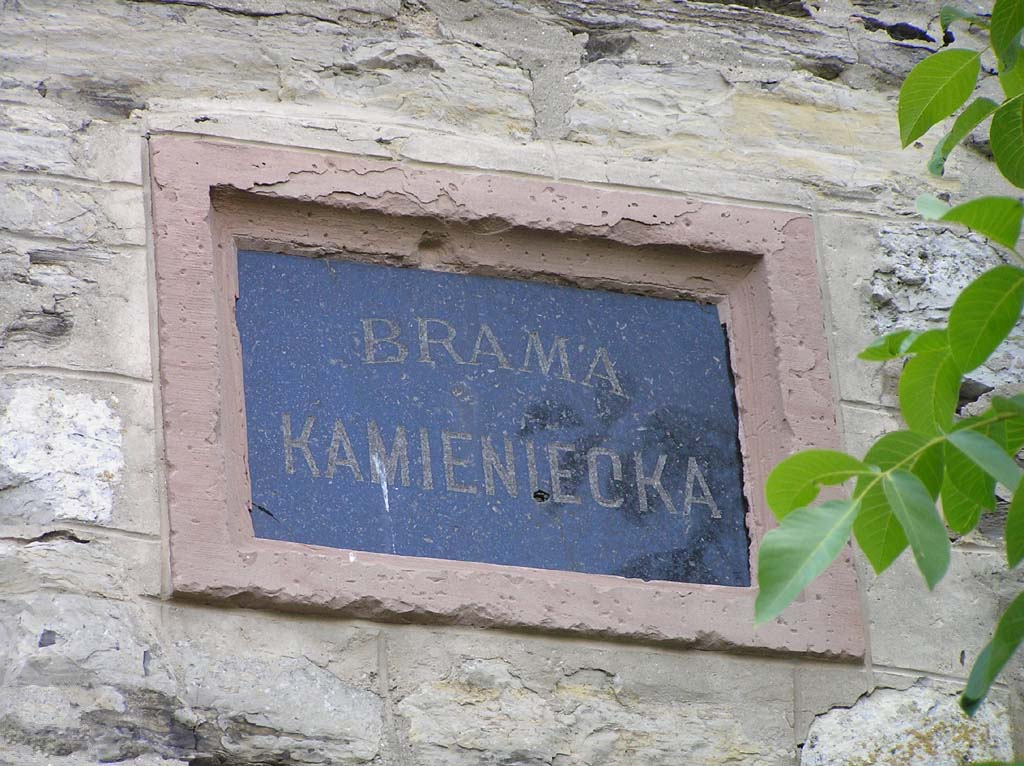
Pre-war plaque with name of gate

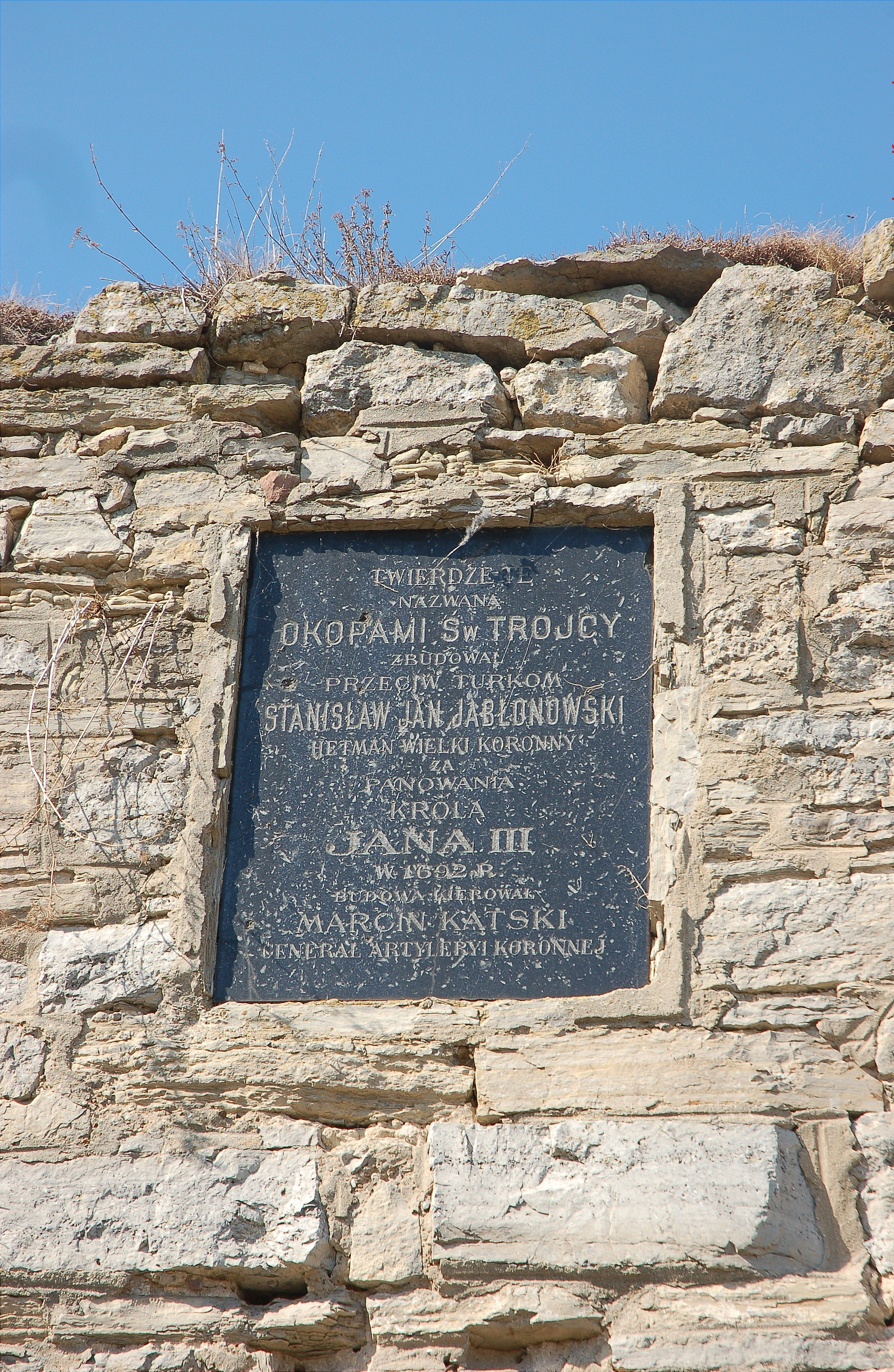
Plaque on Lvivska Gate

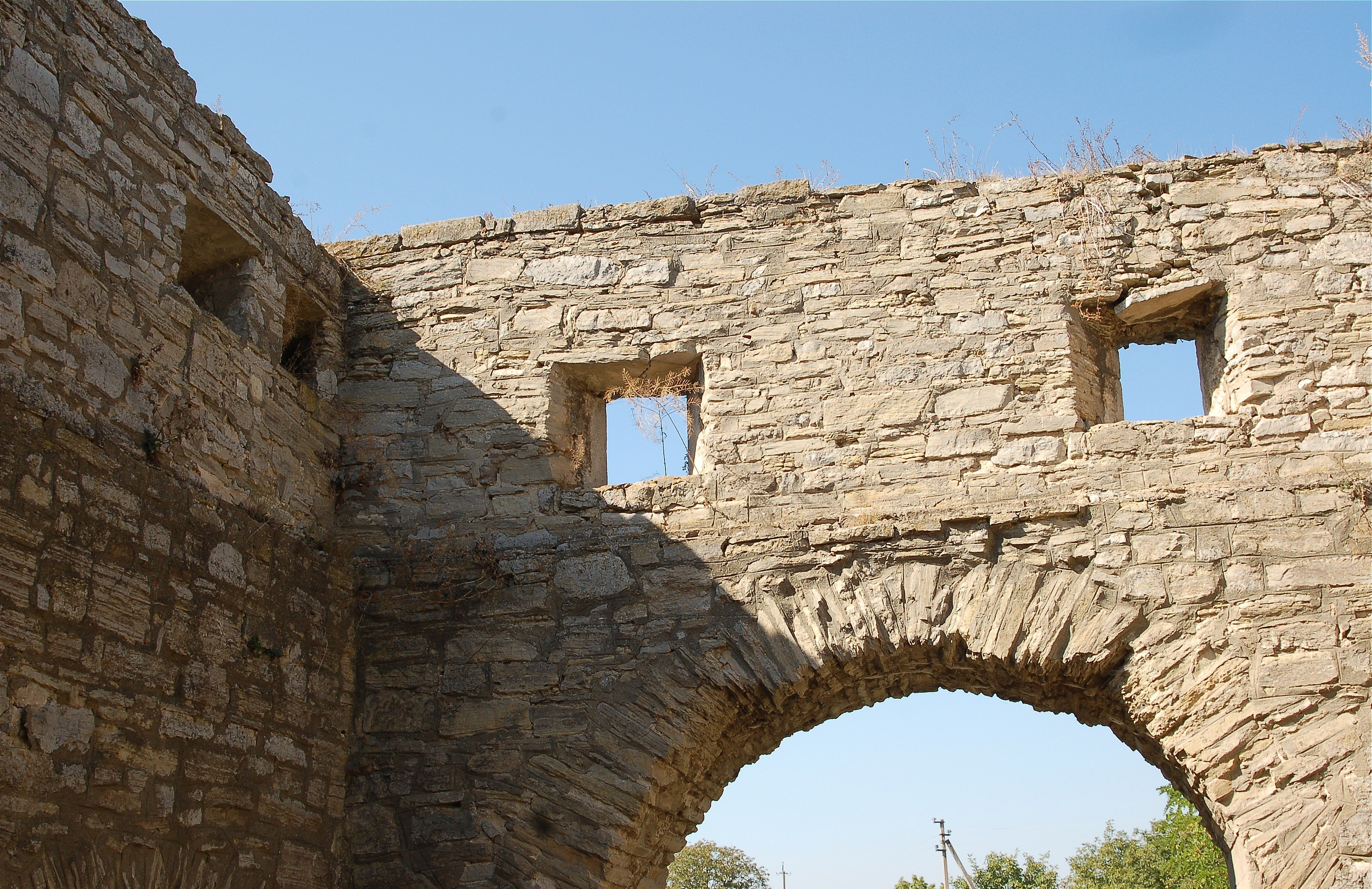
Lvivska Gate interior

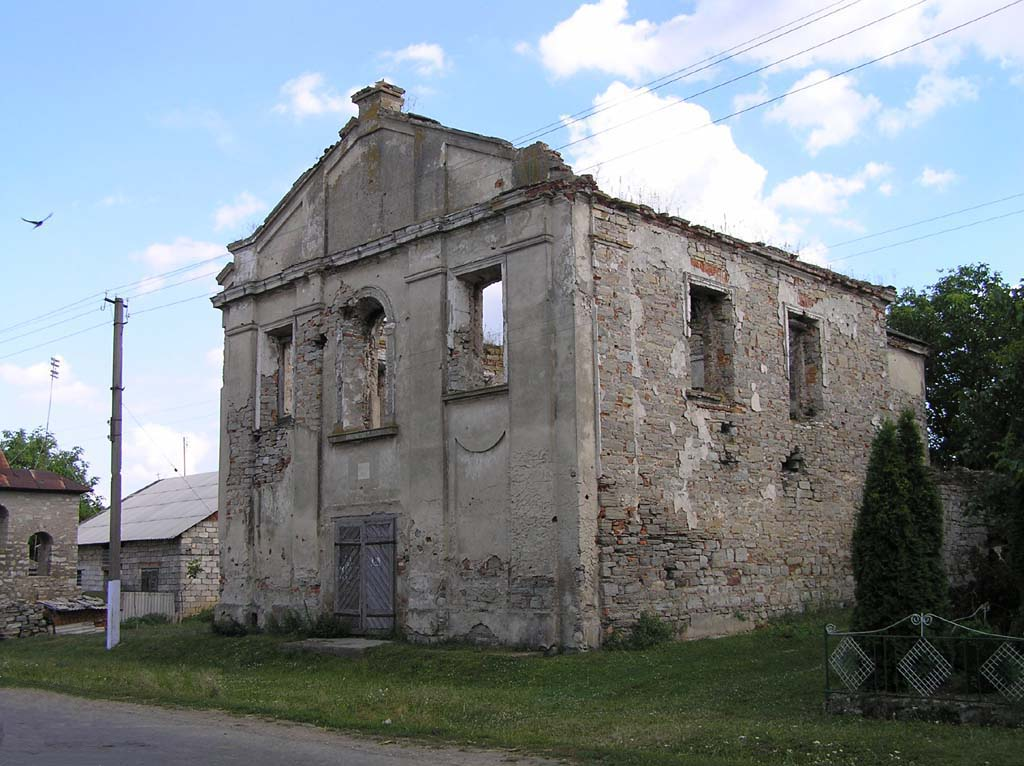
Roman Catholic Church

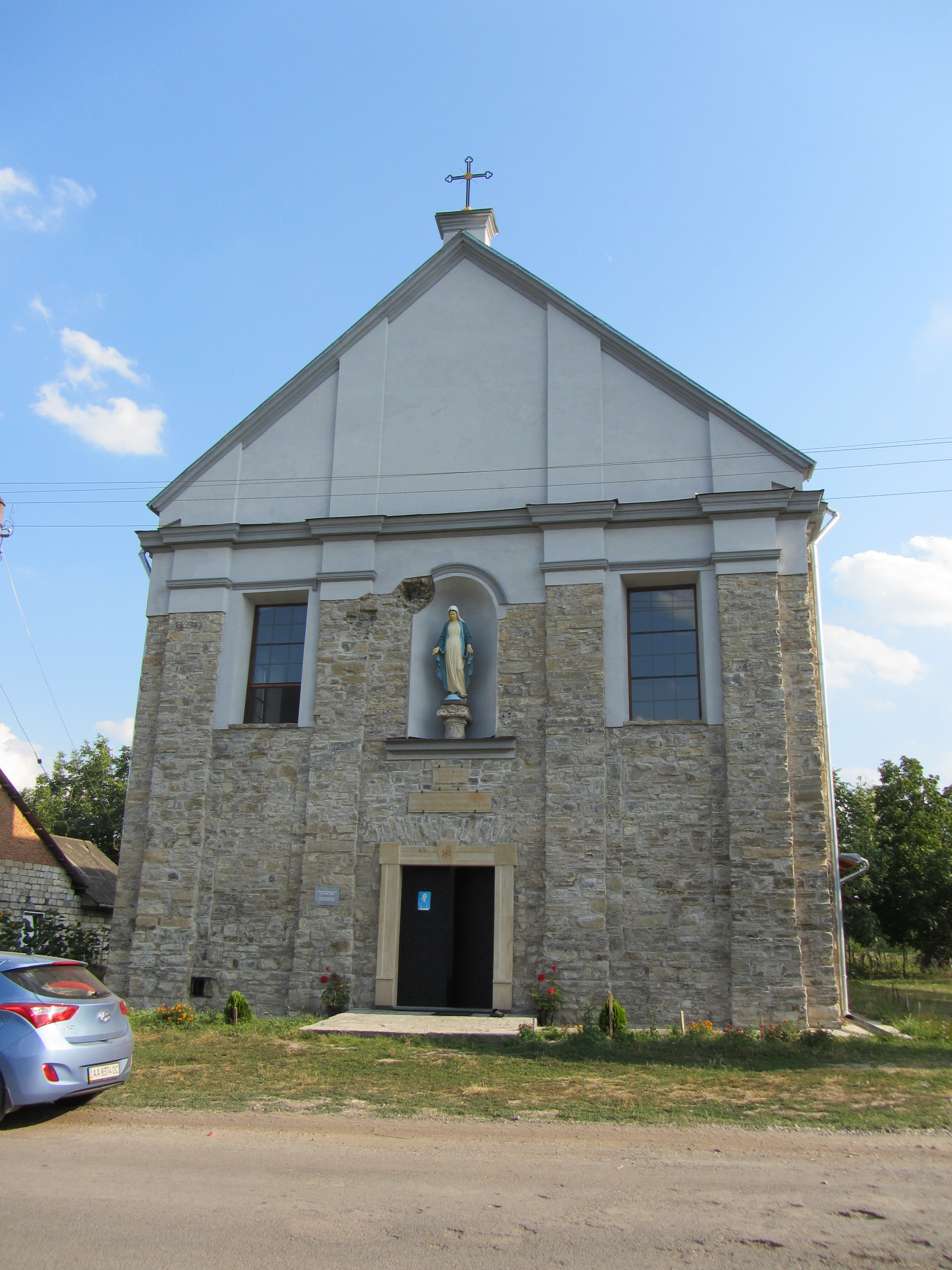
Roman Catholic Church after restoration

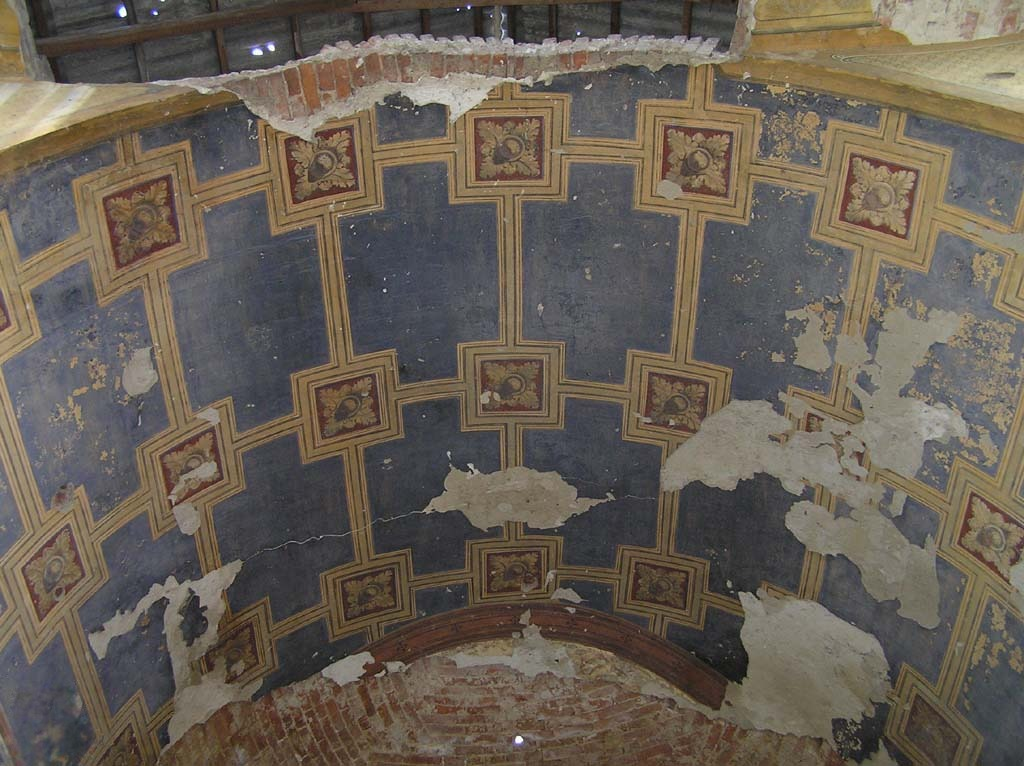
Polychrome on the Roman Catholic Church walls

== Bibliography ==
- (in Ukrainian) Бойко В., Окопівська фортеця // Ternopil Encyclopedic Dictionary: in 4 v. / editorial board: H. Yavorskyi and other, Ternopil: "Zbruch", 2010, V. 4: А—Я (додатковий), S. 421—422. — ISBN 978-966-528-318-8.
- Рутинський М. Замковий туризм в Україні. Географія пам'яток фортифікаційного зодчества та перспективи їх туристичного відродження: Навчальний посібник. — К., 2007.
- "Okopy Świętej Trójcy". Geographical Dictionary of the Kingdom of Poland (in Polish). 7. Warszawa: Kasa im. Józefa Mianowskiego. 1886. p. 432.
- Rolle A. Zameczki podolskie na kresach multańskich. — Warszawa, 1880. — t. III. — S. 35.
