= White House Hanukkah Party =

Annual reception held at the White House

Hanukkah
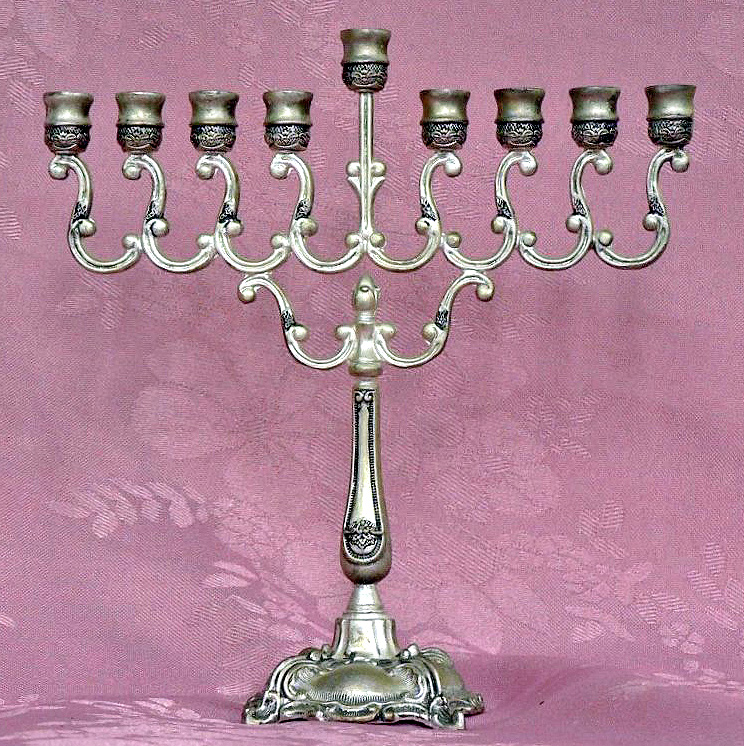
- A Hanukkah menorah (9-branch candelabra)
- Official name: Hebrew: חֲנֻכָּה or חנוכה; English translation: "Establishing" or "Dedication" (of the Temple in Jerusalem)
- Also called: Festival of Lights, Festival of Dedication
- Observed by: Jews
- Celebrations: Lighting the lights on the branches of the Hanukkah menorah (Hanukkiyah). Special foods, prayers, and songs.
- Begins: 25 Kislev on the Jewish calendar
- Ends: 8 days later: 2 Tevet or 3 Tevet on the Jewish calendar, depending on the year.

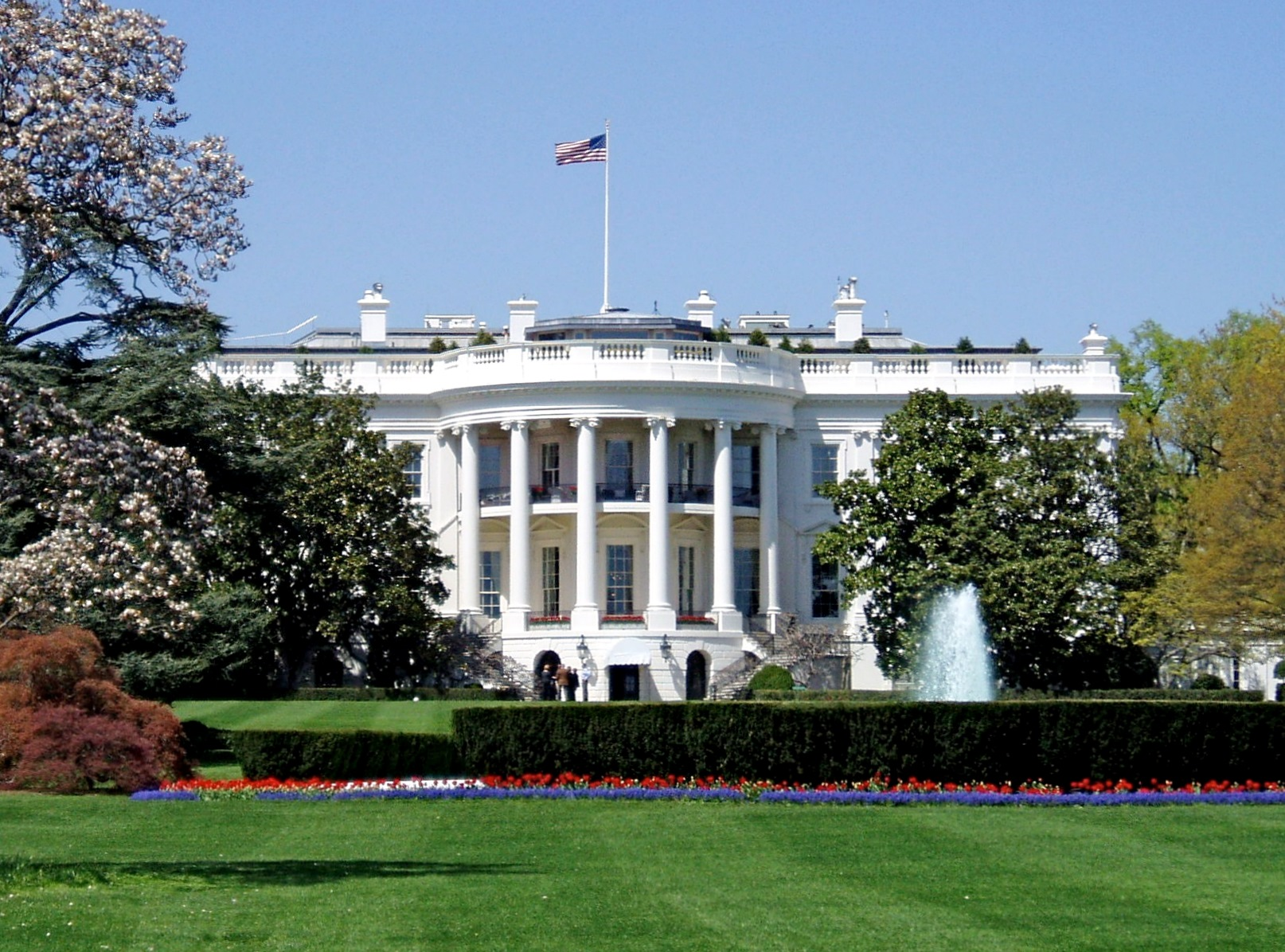
White House, South Facade

The White House Hanukkah Party is an annual reception held at the White House and hosted by the U.S. president and first lady to recognize and celebrate the Jewish festival of Hanukkah. The tradition was established in 2001, during the administration of George W. Bush. The guest list includes hundreds of American Jewish politicians, organization heads, and school and yeshiva deans.

The reception has become one of a number of ways the president recognizes the holiday, along with a proclamation/message, and participation by the president or a member of his staff in the lighting of the National Menorah (Hanukkiyah, special 9-branch Hanukkah candelabra) on the National Mall. Additionally, in 1996, 2004 and 2009, the United States Postal Service issued Hanukkah themed postage stamps in honor of the holiday.

== Pre-White House story: George Washington and Hanukkah ==
Although the truth of the story is impossible to prove, there is an account about George Washington and the meaning of Hanukkah that has become part of American lore:

For centuries, the lights of the Hanukkah menorah have inspired hope and courage. They may have also been responsible for inspiring then-General George Washington to forge on when everything looked bleak when his cold and hungry Continental Army camped at Valley Forge in the winter of 1777/8. The story is told that Washington was walking among his troops when he saw one soldier sitting apart from the others, huddled over what looked like two tiny flames. Washington approached the soldier and asked him what he was doing. The soldier explained that he was a Jew and he had lit the candles to celebrate Hanukkah, the festival commemorating the miraculous victory of his people so many centuries ago over the tyranny of a much better equipped and more powerful enemy who had sought to deny them their freedom. The soldier then expressed his confidence that just as, with the help of God, the Jews of ancient times were ultimately victorious, so too would they be victorious in their just cause for freedom. Washington thanked the soldier and walked back to where the rest of the troops camped, warmed by the inspiration of those little flames and the knowledge that miracles are possible.

The historical source for the above story is a second-hand account, but is nonetheless fairly credible. In December 1778, General George Washington had supper at the home of Michael Hart, a Jewish merchant in Easton, Pennsylvania. It was during the Hanukkah celebration, and Hart began to explain the customs of the holiday to his guest. Washington replied that he already knew about Hanukkah. He told Hart and his family of meeting the Jewish soldier at Valley Forge the previous year. (According to Washington, the soldier was a Polish immigrant who said he had fled his homeland because he could not practice his faith under the Prussian government there.) Hart's daughter Louisa wrote the story down in her diary. The story has been quoted by several Jewish historians, including Rabbi I. Harold Sharfman in his 1977 book, Jews on the Frontier.

== Early years: Christmas at the White House, but not Hanukkah ==
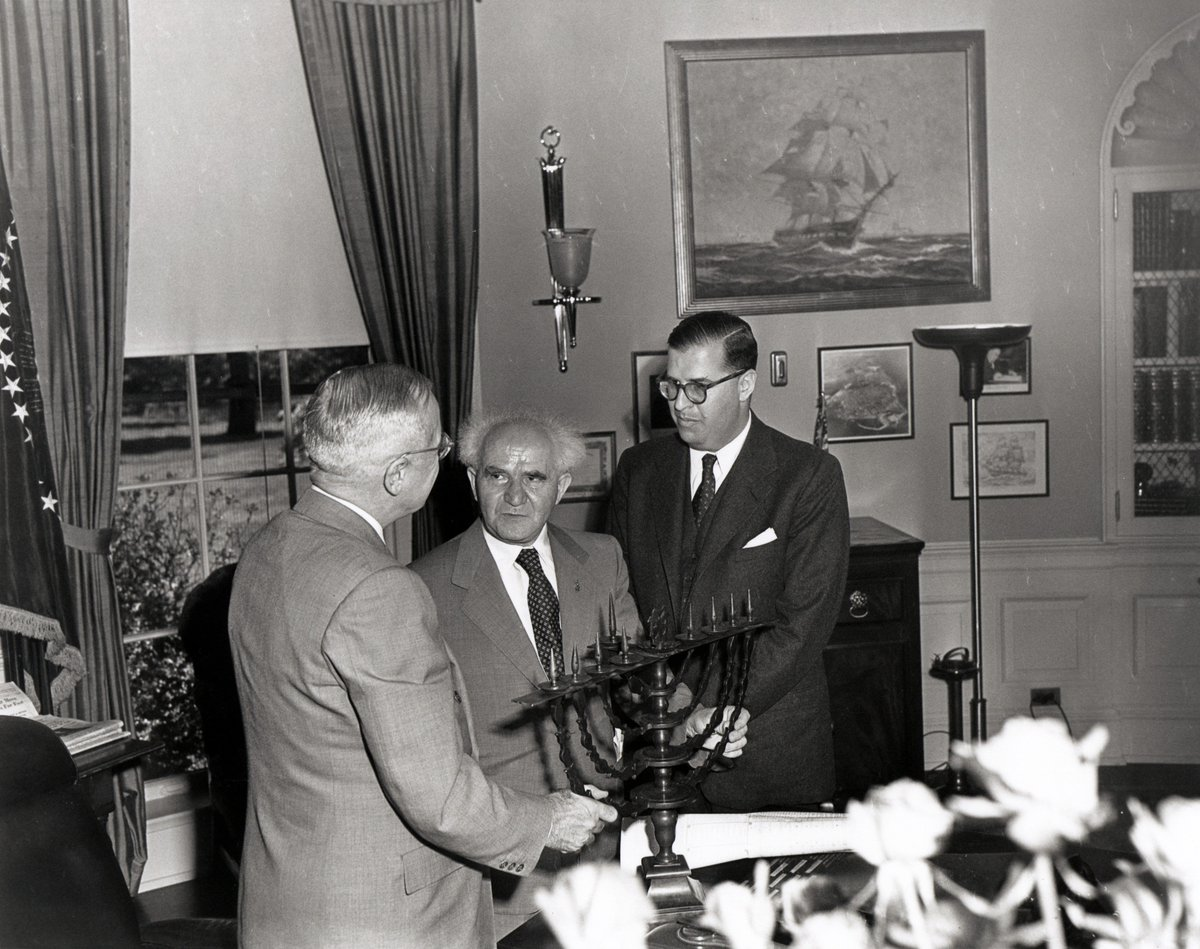
President Harry S. Truman (left) in the Oval Office, receiving a Hanukkah menorah as a gift from the prime minister of Israel, David Ben-Gurion (center). Abba Eban (Right), was the Israeli ambassador to the United States.

For two centuries after the time of the story about George Washington and Hanukkah, Christmas was the only winter religious holiday officially recognized by the White House. In 1923, President Calvin Coolidge began lighting an official White House Christmas tree, and also delivered the first formal presidential message for the holiday. In 1927, his proclamation included the statement that, "Christmas is not a time or a season, but a state of mind". Focusing on the holiday's message, he continued, would guarantee that "there will be born in us a Savior and over us will shine a star sending its gleam of hope to the world".

President Franklin D. Roosevelt continued the White House tradition of treating Christmas as if it were a holiday celebrated by all Americans, declaring that Christmas was a national holiday "because the teachings of Christ are fundamental to our lives". His successor, Harry S. Truman, did the same, using his Christmas message as an opportunity to ask Americans to "put our trust in the unerring Star which guided the Wise Men to the Manger of Bethlehem". However, although he may never have spoken about Hanukkah, Truman was historically linked to the holiday, at least indirectly, when in 1951, Prime Minister of Israel David Ben-Gurion made an official presentation of a Hanukkah menorah to Truman and the people of the United States.

Even President John F. Kennedy described Christmas as an important time for citizens of all religions, without addressing the importance of Hanukkah to the Jewish community, when he declared in 1962 that "Moslems, Hindus, Buddhists, as well as Christians, pause from their labors the 25th day of December to celebrate the birthday of the Prince of Peace", and that "there could be no more striking proof that Christmas is truly the universal holiday of all men".

== Early White House–Hanukkah links ==
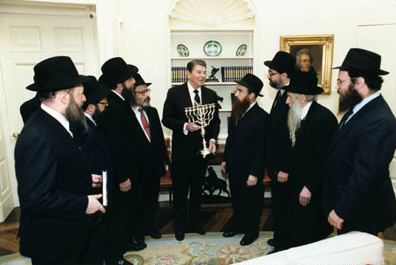
President Ronald Reagan receives a hanukkiah (Hanukkah menorah) from the American Friends of Lubavitch, White House, 1984.

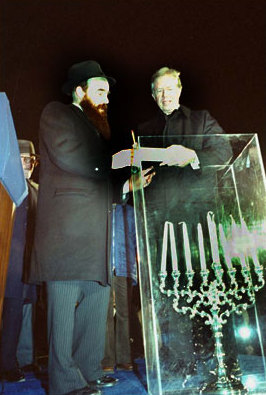
President Jimmy Carter (right) at Hanukkah menorah lighting, Lafayette Park, 1979.

Jimmy Carter was the first president who officially recognized Hanukkah, when in 1979 he walked from the White House to Lafayette Park to deliver brief remarks as he lit the new National Menorah erected by the Jewish group, Chabad-Lubavitch. Based on his sensitivity to Hanukkah, his next annual Christmas message was carefully worded, with greetings "to those of our fellow citizens who join us in the joyous celebration of Christmas". Since then, every president has participated in a menorah-lighting ceremony to recognize Hanukkah, and directed the Christmas message to those citizens who celebrate that holiday. Joshua Eli Plaut's book A Kosher Christmas: 'Tis the Season to Be Jewish," (Rutgers University Press, 2012) cites President Jimmy Carter's daily diary entry detailing his lighting of the shamash candle on the menorah in the presence of the Chabad Rabbi. See www.akosherchristmas.org

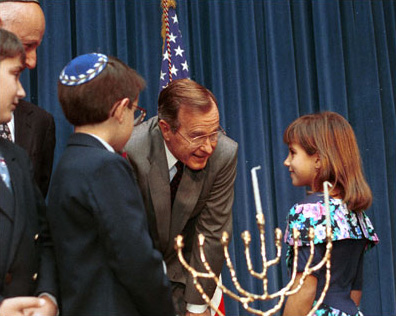
President George H. W. Bush attends White House staff Hanukkah party, 1991.

In 1983, President Ronald Reagan visited the Rockville, Maryland, Jewish Community Center and offered remarks after the Hanukkah menorah was lit, and in 1984, on the eve of Hanukkah, he hosted a visit to the White House by a delegation of rabbis from the Orthodox Jewish organization, American Friends of Lubavitch. The group later recounted that they were surprised that, when the time had come for them to depart, President Reagan invited them to remain a little longer so that he could tell them a story about a rabbi serving as a Navy chaplain. He recounted the story of Rabbi Arnold Resnicoff, whose kippa (skullcap) had to be discarded after the 1983 Beirut barracks bombing because it was covered in blood after being used to wipe the faces of wounded Marines; whereupon a Catholic chaplain, Fr. George Pucciarelli, tore a piece of his camouflage uniform off, to be used as a temporary replacement for the kippa. Reagan thanked the group in an official February 12, 1985, White House letter to Rabbi Abraham Shemtov, the organization's national director, ending with the prayer: "May the light of the menorah always be a source of strength and inspiration to the Jewish people and to all mankind". Reagan also began to use the term "Judeo-Christian heritage" more and more during his presidency, and in a radio address on December 26, 1987, spoke of the link of both Hanukkah and Christmas "as two religious observances that go to the heart of America's Judeo-Christian heritage".

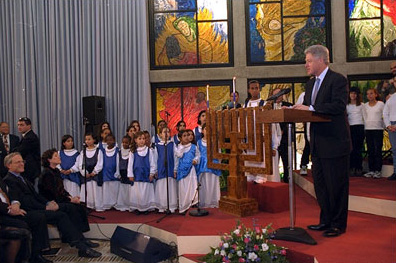
President Bill Clinton, Hanukkah ceremony, Israeli Presidential Residence, Jerusalem, December 13, 1998.

Later, President George H.W. Bush would "proudly display" the menorah he received as a gift from the Synagogue Council of America, a group representing the major denominations and movements of American Judaism. He also attended a Hanukkah party for staff in the Executive Office Building, in 1991.

Gifts aside, it was not until the administration of President Bill Clinton that a president actually hosted a menorah-lighting ceremony in the White House. In 1993, he gathered a dozen or so school children for a ceremony in the Oval Office. The event made the news because the ponytail on one of the girls, 6-year-old Ilana Kattan, briefly started smoking when it touched one of the flames from the candles – but Clinton used his hands to "snuff out" the smoke. Clinton also joined Israeli president Ezer Weizman for a Hanukkah candle-lighting ceremony in Jerusalem, December 13, 1998.

Under Clinton, some Jewish leaders were among the guests at the White House Hanukkah menorah lightings. In 1996, during his administration, the first United States postage stamp honoring Hanukkah was issued, and was the first stamp to be a joint-issue between the United States and Israel.

== First official White House Hanukkah Party ==
The first official White House Hanukkah Party was held on December 10, 2001, under the leadership of President George W. Bush, using a 100-year-old Hanukkah menorah that the White House borrowed from the Jewish Museum of New York. Bush had hosted many annual Christmas parties, stressing the religious importance of that holiday beyond its significance as a national holiday. At the same time, he began hosting a separate Hanukkah party for leaders of the Jewish community. He stressed that many presidents had participated in Hanukkah candle-lighting ceremonies, but that this occasion was the first time that the ceremony had been carried out as part of a larger, official community celebration, reception, and observance of the holiday in the White House. While previously, candles had been lit in the Oval Office, this was the first time in American history that the celebration would take place in the White House residence.

In his remarks, Bush stated that this residence, the White House, might be a "temporary home" for him and for his wife, Laura, but that "it's the people's house" – and "it belongs to people of all faiths". Bush also noted that 2001 had been a year of "much sadness" for America and for Israel – and that they had grieved together. "But as we watch the lighting of this second candle of Hanukkah, we are reminded of the ancient story of Israel's courage, and of the power of faith to make the darkness bright". He then went on to pray for a "better day" – "when this Festival of Freedom may be celebrated in a world free from terror".

== Other White House Hanukkah Parties hosted by President George W. Bush ==
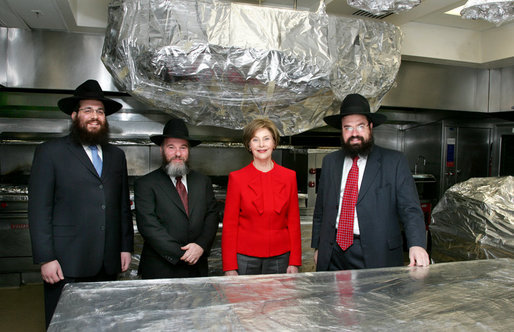
First Lady Laura Bush poses in the White House kitchen with the rabbis who supervised the kashering of the kitchen for the 2008 annual Hanukkah party. (L. to r.) Rabbi Mendel Minkowitz, Rabbi Binyomin Steinmetz, Rabbi Levi Shemtov.

=== 2004 ===
Bush continued the tradition of White House ceremonies and receptions for Hanukkah, expanding both the guest list and preparations for the event. For example, after an embarrassing incident in 2004 when non-kosher foods were mixed up with some special kosher foods that had been brought in for the occasion, the Hanukkah party in 2005 began the tradition of kashering the White House kitchen so that all foods served at the party would be kosher. According to Rabbi Levi Shemtov, director of the American Friends of Lubavitch and head of the team that kashers the White House kitchen for the annual Hanukkah party, the ovens are first scrubbed clean by Marines or Navy personnel employed by the White House, and are then heated to 500 °F (260 °C) to 600 °F (316 °C) to render them kosher. Servingware – including "hundreds of platters, thousands of pieces of silverware and other small items, and lots of stands and serving pieces" – are also kashered for the event.

One Hanukkah activity involving the president's staff that might have been a "first" was OMB director Josh Bolten's reading of two Hanukkah bedtime stories over the White House website, as part of a special series of stories set up by First Lady Laura Bush. A number of other individuals, including Mrs. Bush herself, former First Lady Barbara Bush, and a number of cabinet members took part in this program, with Bolten's selection as the reader of the Hanukkah stories was presumably linked to his religious affiliation.

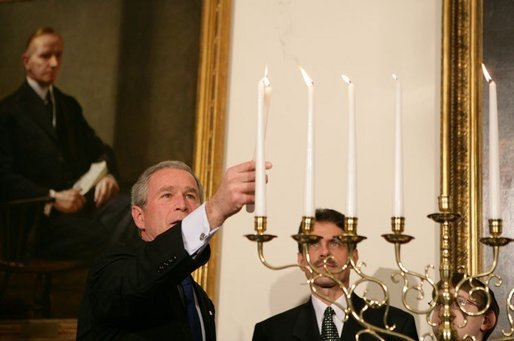
President George W. Bush (left) participates in the menorah lighting at the White House with Rabbi Joshua Skoff of the Park Synagogue, Cleveland, Ohio, and son, Jared, December 6, 2005. (White House photo)

=== 2005 ===
In 2005, another first for the White House Hanukkah celebration. During the White House Menorah lighting in the family residence, President Bush lit one of the candles on the Menorah during the ceremony, making him the first U.S. President to do so. Up until that year and since, invited Jewish guests have been the designated "lighters." In 2005, Rabbi Joshua Skoff of Cleveland, Ohio, along with his wife Ilana, and children Jared and Eden, were to light the candles, which they did. In the moment, however, Rabbi Skoff spontaneously invited President Bush to light one of the candles, and he agreed. The photo of the President of the United States lighting the Hanukkah Menorah became the most publicized moment of the event. This was also the first Hanukkah ceremony held in advance of the holiday, due to Presidential plans to be away from Washington during the actual Hanukkah holiday later in the month. In his comments, Rabbi Skoff joked that his children were excited "to observe the 25 days of Hanukkah."

=== 2007 ===
In 2007, President George W. Bush and Laura Bush invited Ruth and Judea Pearl, parents of slain Wall Street Journal correspondent Daniel Pearl, to light the menorah that once belonged to Daniel's great grandparents, Chaim and Rosa Pearl, who brought it with them when they moved from Poland to Israel in 1924 to establish the town of Bnei Brak.

"While reporting in Pakistan in 2002" the president said, "Daniel was kidnapped and murdered by terrorists. His only crime was being a Jewish American – something Daniel Pearl would never deny. In his final moment, Daniel told his captors about a street in Israel named after his great-grandfather. He looked into their camera and he said: 'My father is Jewish, my mother is Jewish, I am Jewish.' These words have become a source of inspiration for Americans of all faiths. They show the courage of a man who refused to bow before terror, and the strength of a spirit that cannot be broken".

"By honoring Daniel, we are given the opportunity to bring forth hope from the darkness of tragedy – and that is a miracle worth celebrating during the Festival of Lights".

=== 2008 ===
In 2008, Bush announced to the guests that he had cut short his farewell trip to Iraq and Afghanistan to ensure he was present for the final Hanukkah party during his administration. For the candle-lighting, he introduced Yariv Ben-Eliezer, grandson of David Ben-Gurion, and Clifton Truman Daniel, grandson of President Harry Truman, to light the historic Hanukkah menorah that Ben-Gurion had presented to Truman in 1951. Bush linked the holiday and Israel in his remarks, explaining that:

The story of Hanukkah recalls the miraculous victory of a small band of patriots against tyranny, and the oil that burned for eight nights. Through centuries of exile and persecution, Jews have lit the menorah. Each year, they behold its glow with faith in the power of God, and love for His greatest gift – freedom. This Hanukkah we celebrate another miraculous victory – the 60th anniversary of the founding of the state of Israel. When President Harry Truman led the world in recognizing Israel in May 1948, many wondered whether the small nation could possibly survive. Yet from the first days of independence, the people of Israel defied dire predictions. With determination and hard work, they turned a rocky desert into fertile soil. They built a thriving democracy, a strong economy, and one of the mightiest military forces on earth. Like the Maccabees, Israel has defended itself bravely against enemies seeking its destruction. And today, Israel is a light unto the nations – and one of America's closest friends.

One small gaffe that reached the press was that the invitations to the Hanukkah party, sent to Jewish leaders throughout the United States, included the image of a horse-drawn cart pulling a Christmas tree to the White House. The White House staff quickly called it a regrettable oversight, and apologized. Press secretary Sally McDonough explained that it was a "staff mistake" to use the same image on all holiday reception invitations, and that First Lady Laura Bush "is apologetic". McDonough added that the invitations would be re-sent, using the image of the menorah Ben-Gurion presented to Harry Truman as the illustration for the new invitations.

== White House Hanukkah Parties hosted by President Barack Obama ==
=== 2009 ===
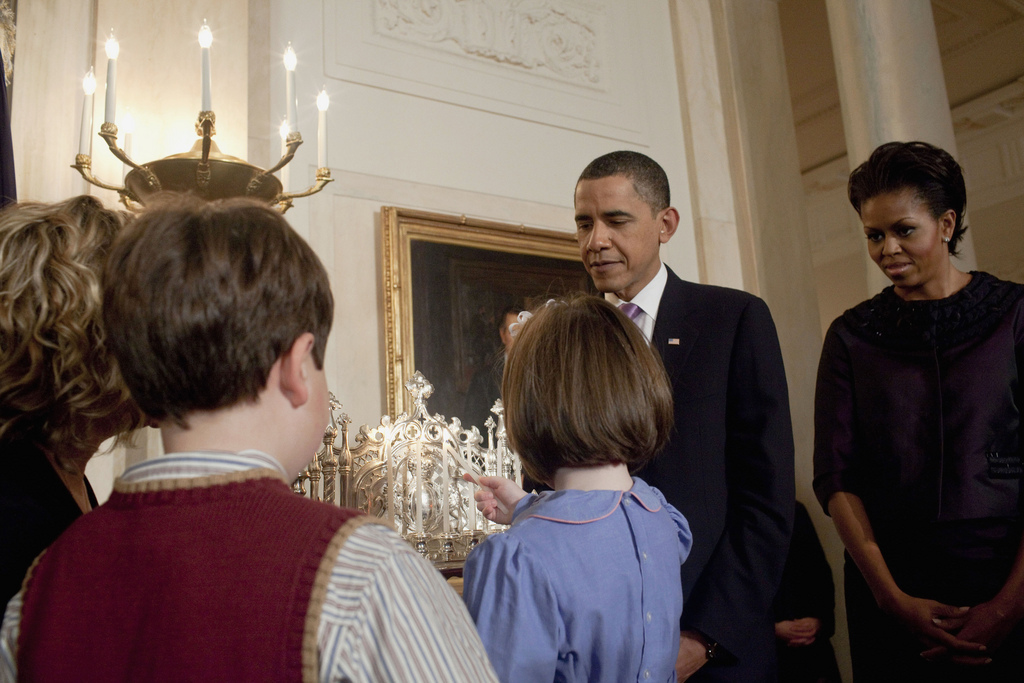
White House Hanukkah Party, candle-lighting, 2009

President Barack Obama continued the tradition of a White House Hanukkah Party established by his predecessor. However, favoring smaller and more intimate receptions, he invited fewer members of the Jewish community than had Bush, a decision that stirred up some controversy – especially when invitees noted that the invitations made no specific mention of Hanukkah, instead inviting guests to a "holiday reception". But many leaders and pundits called the criticism chutzpah (audacity), with one article in The Huffington Post stating that Obama ought to be applauded, not attacked, as he and his administration continued efforts to govern in a bipartisan and inclusive manner; this Hanukkah party was just one positive reflection of this trend.

For the 2009 Hanukkah party, the White House had made arrangements to use a sterling silver Hanukkah menorah on special loan from the Jewish Museum in Prague, at the request of the First Lady. She had toured Jewish historic sites in Prague in April 2009 during her husband's official state visit. The menorah was crafted by Viennese silversmith Cyril Schillberger in 1783. At the candle-lighting ceremony, candles were lit by two young children of a Jewish soldier deployed in Iraq.

One "first" for President Obama was the fact that his 2009 Hanukkah message was issued in both English and Hebrew versions. The message recalls the Hanukkah story of Jews who fought for religious freedom against seemingly overwhelming odds, noting that the lesson for everyone is "that faith and perseverance are powerful forces that can sustain us in difficult times and help us overcome even the greatest odds".

Other members of President Obama's staff – and other U.S. leaders at all levels of government – continued to participate in official Hanukkah ceremonies in the tradition of previous administrations. For example, in 2009, White House Chief of Staff Rahm Emanuel participated in the lighting of the menorah on the National Mall.

=== 2010 ===
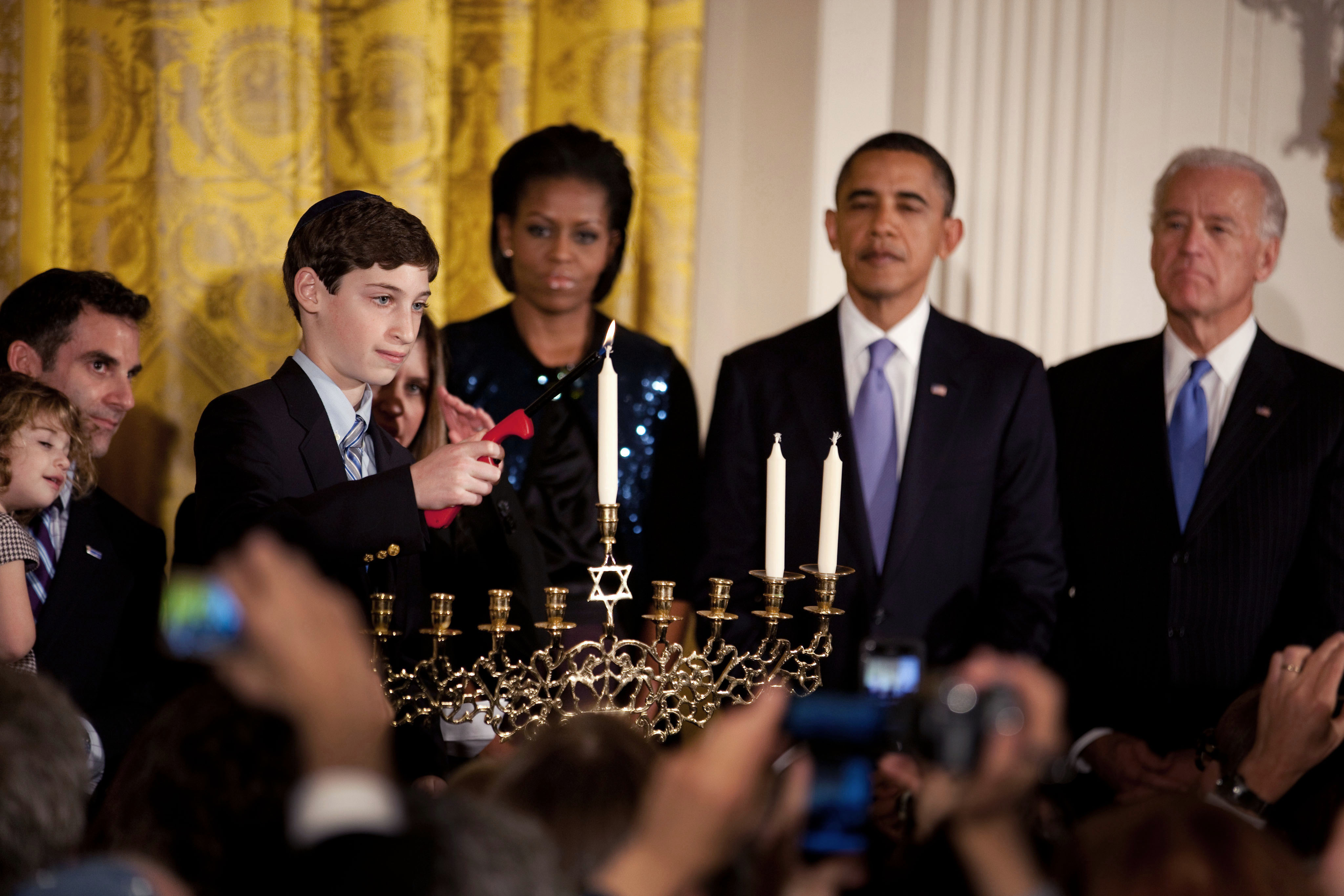
President Barack Obama, First Lady Michelle Obama, and Vice President Joe Biden look on as Ben Retik lights the Hanukkah menorah in the East Room of the White House, December 2, 2010. Retik's father David Retik was killed on board American Airlines Flight 11 on September 11, 2001.

The 2010 White House Hanukkah Party was held on Thursday evening, December 2, and featured a Hanukkah menorah salvaged from Congregation Beth Israel, then in Lakeview, New Orleans, after Hurricane Katrina. The menu included kosher sushi and potato latkes, and the entertainment included a solo saxophone rendition of Ma'oz Tzur ("Rock of Ages"), by saxophonist Joshua Redman, and other Hanukkah melodies performed by the United States Marine Band.

President Obama's remarks included his observation that the Hanukkah message of rededication is an important reminder to people of all faiths:

In every corner of the world, Jews have lit the Hanukkah candles as symbols of resilience in times of peace, and in times of persecution – in concentration camps and ghettos; war zones and unfamiliar lands. Their light inspires us to hope beyond hope; to believe that miracles are possible even in the darkest of hours. It is this message of Hanukkah that speaks to us no matter what faith we practice or what beliefs we cherish…it invites all of us to rededicate ourselves to improving the lives of those around us, spreading the light of freedom and tolerance wherever oppression and prejudice exist.

=== 2011 ===
The 2011 White House Hanukkah Party took place on the night of December 8, 2011 – one week before the start of the holiday on the Jewish calendar. President Obama and his wife, and Vice President Joe Biden and his wife, feted approximately 550 invited guests, including Ruth Bader Ginsburg, Associate Justice of the Supreme Court of the United States, and Michael Oren, Israeli Ambassador to the United States. The lighting of the menorah was performed with a menorah crafted in a displaced persons camp, donated by the Jewish Museum of New York. The program featured a performance by The West Point Jewish Chapel Choir and strictly kosher food, including "Sushi Rolls, Caramelized Pearl Onions, Shitake Mushrooms, Pine Nut Herb Crusted Lamb Chops and Homemade Sufganyot".

President Obama joked that the premature celebration of Hanukkah should not lead children to "start thinking Hanukkah lasts 20 nights instead of 8". In reference to Hanukkah, President Obama went on to say, "We never need an excuse for a good party." On a more serious note, he said:

This year, we have to recognize the miracles in our own lives. Let's honor the sacrifices our ancestors made so that we might be here today. Let's think about those who are spending this holiday far away from home – including members of our military who guard our freedom around the world. Let's extend a hand to those who are in need, and allow the value of tikkun olam to guide our work this holiday season. This is also a time to be grateful for our friendships, both with each other and between our nations. And that includes, of course, our unshakeable support and commitment to the security of the nation of Israel.

=== 2012 ===
The 2012 White House Hanukkah Party was held on the sixth night of Hanukkah, Thursday evening, December 13, 2012. More than 500 American Jewish leaders attended the reception in the Grand Foyer of the White House. Rabbi Larry Bazer, a Jewish military chaplain stationed in Afghanistan the previous Hanukkah, was given the honor of lighting the sixth candle of Hanukkah on a 90-year-old menorah rescued from a Long Island synagogue battered by Hurricane Sandy. In his remarks, President Obama noted:

Last Hanukkah, Rabbi Bazer – and he happens to be the Joint Forces Chaplain for the Massachusetts National Guard—was four months into his deployment in Afghanistan, and he lit a custom-built electric menorah in the central square of Camp Phoenix in Kabul. As the only rabbi in Afghanistan at the time, he spent every night of Hanukkah with a different group of soldiers, reminding them of the Maccabees' perseverance, and bringing them faith to guide their challenging work.

The press reported that Obama's nomination of Senator Chuck Hagel as Secretary of Defense was one of the hot topics of conversation at the party, as was the fiscal cliff set to go into effect in January 2013.

== White House Hanukkah Parties hosted by President Donald Trump ==
=== 2017 ===
President Donald Trump continued the tradition of a White House Hanukkah Party established by his predecessors. The 2017 event was held on December 7, five days in advance of Hanukkah. Trump was accompanied to the East Room reception by his wife Melania, daughter Ivanka, son-in-law Jared Kushner, and the couple's three children, who, Trump noted, are Jewish. Vice President Mike Pence and his wife Karen, Secretary of the Treasury Steven Mnuchin, Secretary of Veterans Affairs David Shulkin, special Middle East envoy Jason Greenblatt, and US Supreme Court Justice Stephen Breyer, were also in attendance. The guest list was much smaller than previous Obama receptions: about 300 people were invited. Most of the guests were Republican supporters; none of the 30 Jewish Democratic members of Congress were invited. Reform Jewish leaders and "progressive Jewish activists" who had been critical of Trump were also omitted from the invitation list. Trump asked a Holocaust survivor, Louise Lawrence-Israels, to address the gathering.

Trump's grandchildren lit a single candle on the menorah without saying the blessings, as the holiday had not yet begun. Entertainment included a girls' yeshiva choir. The main topic of conversation was U.S. recognition of Jerusalem as the capital of Israel, which Trump had just announced a day earlier. Trump said in his remarks, "Well, I know for a fact there are a lot of happy people in this room".

=== 2018 ===
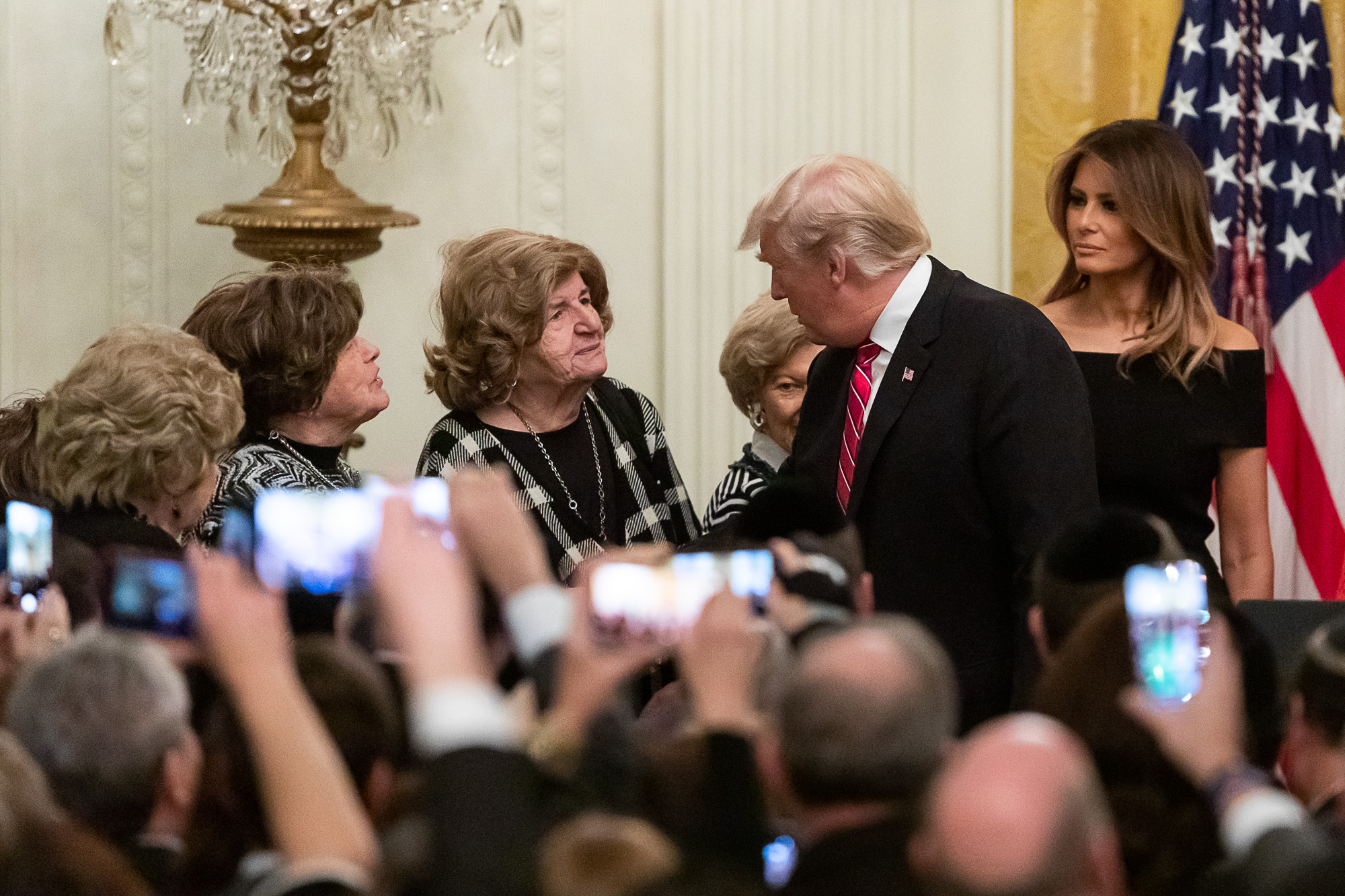
Donald and Melania Trump greet Holocaust survivors at the 2018 White House Hanukkah Party

The 2018 White House Hanukkah Party was held on December 6. It had been scheduled for December 5, but was postponed for the state funeral of former President George H. W. Bush. The event comprised two receptions, one at 3 p.m. and another at 7 p.m., in order to accommodate a larger guest list. Following criticism of the absence of Congressional Democrats from the 2017 reception, invitations were extended to all Jewish members of Congress. Other attendees included U.S. envoy to Israel Ron Dermer and tycoon Sheldon Adelson.

At the afternoon reception, Trump honored eight Holocaust survivors. At the evening reception, he honored Andrew Pollack, father of student Meadow Pollack, one of the victims of the 2018 Stoneman Douglas High School shooting. Trump stated that the menorah was being lit in Meadow Pollack's memory. During his remarks, Trump noted that the date marked the one-year anniversary of the United States' official recognition of Jerusalem as the capital of Israel. In other remarks, he remembered the murder of 11 Jews in a Pittsburgh synagogue in October, saying that "we reaffirmed our solemn duty to confront anti-Semitism everywhere…[We] must stamp out this vile hatred from the world".

In November 2019, CNN reported that Trump and his lawyer, Rudy Giuliani, had been photographed at the 2018 White House Hanukkah Party with Russian–American businessmen Lev Parnas and Igor Fruman; Parnas had posted the picture on his Twitter page. Afterwards the four reportedly repaired to a private room where Trump allegedly asked them to help with a scheme to coerce the Ukrainian government to investigate Joe Biden and his son Hunter. When Parnas and Fruman were arrested in October 2019, Trump stated that he did not know the two men.

=== 2019 ===
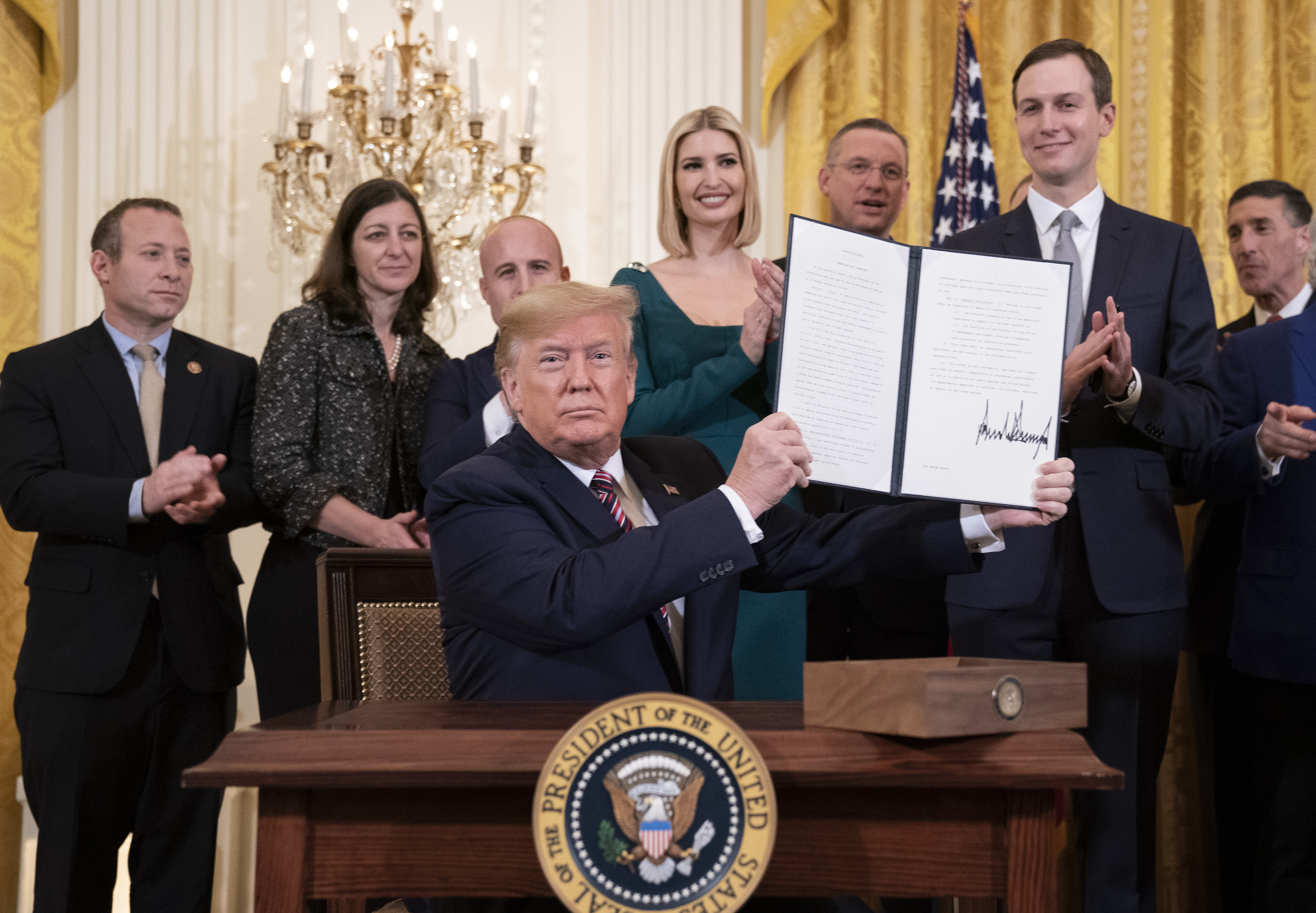
President Trump displays his signature on an executive order committing his administration to combating the rise of anti-Semitism, signed during the afternoon Hanukkah reception, December 11, 2019

The 2019 White House Hanukkah party was held on December 11, a week and a half prior to the holiday, in the East Room of the White House. Trump was joined by his wife Melania; daughter Ivanka, son-in-law Jared Kushner, and their three children; Jared's father Charles Kushner and his family; Vice President Mike Pence and his wife Karen; Secretary of the Treasury Steve Mnuchin, Secretary of the Interior David Bernhardt, US Special Envoy to Monitor and Combat Anti-Semitism Elan Carr, former Special Representative for International Negotiations Jason Greenblatt, Israeli Ambassador to the United States Ron Dermer, and Jewish members of Congress. Other guests included Sheldon and Miriam Adelson, Harvard professor of law Alan Dershowitz, and Robert Kraft, owner of the New England Patriots. Trump also asked evangelical Christian leader Robert Jeffress to speak, lauding him as a "tremendous faith leader".

As in 2018, both afternoon and evening receptions were held. Entertainment included a Jewish a cappella group and a 20-musician orchestra playing traditional Hanukkah songs.

During the afternoon reception, Trump signed an executive order that mandates government offices to view Judaism as a race or nationality, not just a religion, and withhold federal funding under Title VI of the Civil Rights Act of 1964 to colleges and universities that allow discrimination against Jewish students. The order is seen as a way to stop Israel boycotts on American college campuses. Trump stated at the reception, "As president, I will always celebrate and honor the Jewish people, and I will always stand with our treasured friend and ally, the State of Israel".

=== 2020 ===
The 2020 White House Hanukkah party was held on December 9, the day before the start of the Hanukkah holiday, in the East Room of the White House. As in previous years, afternoon and evening receptions were held, with 100 attendees at each gathering. Neither reception had a Hanukkah menorah-lighting ceremony, but the White House band entertained guests. Trump did not attend the afternoon reception, but made an appearance at the evening event. U.S. Secretary of the Treasury Steven Mnuchin was the most senior official at the afternoon reception; other attendees included Special Representative for International Negotiations Avi Berkowitz and Zionist Organization of America chairman of the board Mark Levenson.

Held indoors in the midst of the COVID-19 pandemic, most attendees wore masks but social distancing was not enforced. Trump and White House Chief of Staff Mark Meadows did not wear masks. Several invitees opted not to attend due to the pandemic, including Harvard professor of law Alan Dershowitz. Trump, who had filed several lawsuits in different states alleging voter fraud in the 2020 United States presidential election, assured attendees that he would eventually be declared the winner.

== Other White House Jewish events ==
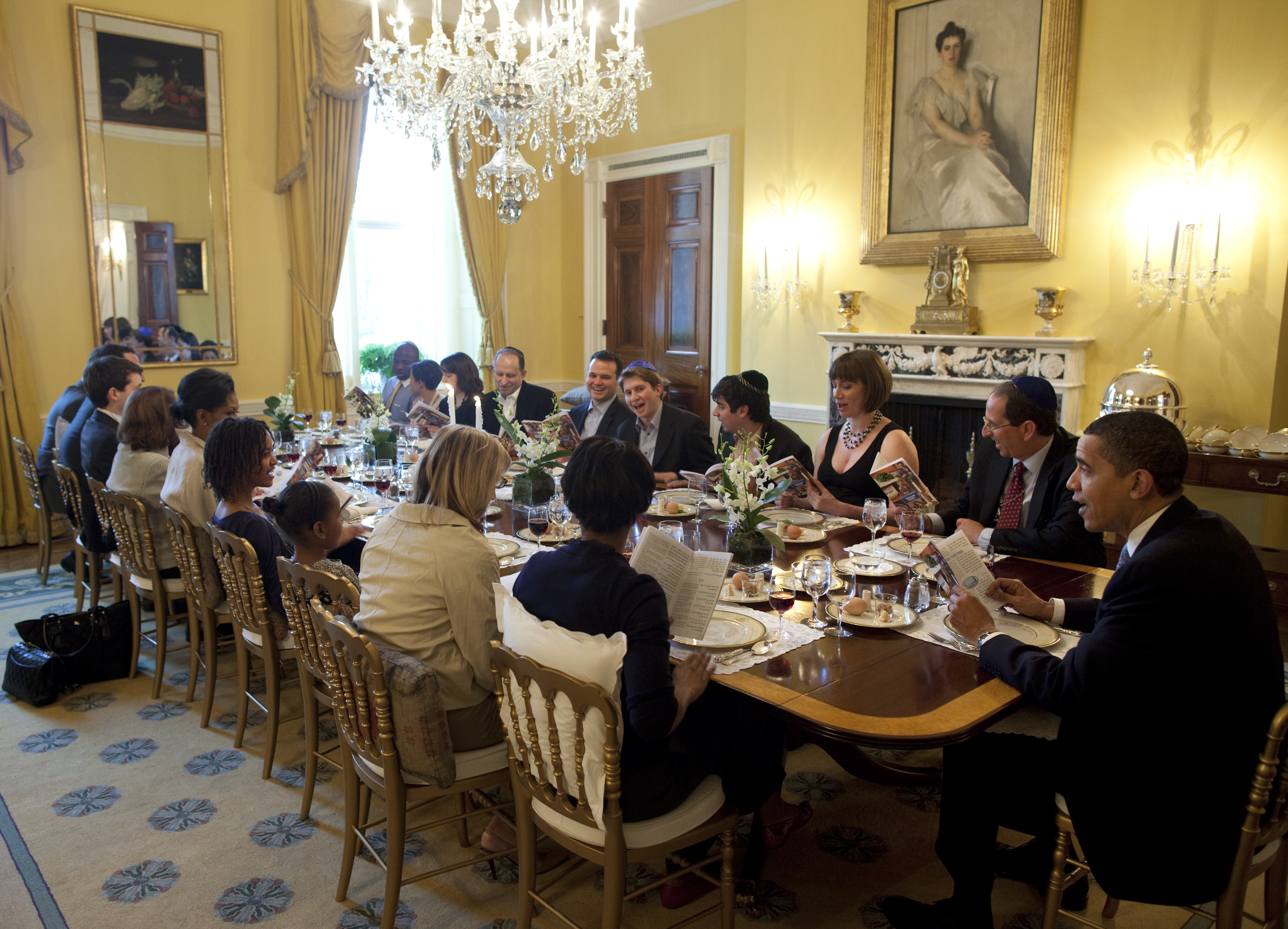
Obamas host the first White House Passover Seder, 2009

In addition to continuing the tradition of the White House Hanukkah Party, the Obamas hosted and attended the White House Passover Seder, the first Passover Seder conducted by a sitting US president in the White House. The Seder was an annual event for all eight years of Obama's presidency.

Additionally, on May 27, 2010, the Obamas hosted the first White House reception for Jewish American Heritage Month (JAHM), an annual, month-long recognition (during May) of the contributions of the Jewish community to American society. The commemoration of JAHM was begun by President George W. Bush, but without a special White House reception linked to its observance.
