= Herbie Ziskend =

American political advisor

White House Principal Deputy Communications Director
- In office August 2024 – January 2025
- President: Joe Biden
- Director: Ben LaBolt
- Preceded by: Kristen Orthman
- Succeeded by: Kaelan Dorr (Deputy)

White House Deputy Communications Director
- In office August 2022 – August 2024
- President: Joe Biden
- Succeeded by: Himself (Principal Deputy)

Senior Advisor for Communications for the Vice President
- In office March 2022 – August 2022
- Vice President: Kamala Harris
- Preceded by: Symone Sanders (Note: As Senior Advisor & Chief Spokesperson for the Vice President)
- Succeeded by: Stephanie Young (Note: As Senior Advisor for Messaging & Outreach for the Vice President)

Deputy Communications Director for the Vice President
- In office January 20, 2021 – March 2022
- Vice President: Kamala Harris
- Succeeded by: Rachel Palermo

Personal details
- Party: Democratic
- Education: Cornell University (BA), Harvard Kennedy School

Herbie Ziskend is an American political advisor who served as White House Principal Deputy Communications Director for President Joe Biden. He previously served as a senior communications advisor for Vice President Kamala Harris from 2021 to 2022, and as a policy and communications advisor to Vice President Joe Biden from 2009 to 2011.

== Education ==
Ziskend earned a Bachelor of Arts from Cornell University and is a graduate of the Harvard Kennedy School of Government.

== Career ==
=== Obama administration ===
Ziskend was a campaign staffer on the Barack Obama 2008 presidential campaign and later served as a policy and communications advisor to Vice President Joe Biden from 2009 to 2011.

During the 2008 presidential campaign, Ziskend, Eric Lesser and Arun Chaudhary organized a seder during the campaign. The tradition followed the Obama administration into the White House as the official White House Passover Seder.

After leaving the White House, Ziskend worked as chief of staff to Arianna Huffington at HuffPost in New York City, and as the director of public policy and rise of rest investments at Revolution LLC, an investment firm led by AOL co-founder Steve Case. Ziskend also worked as a senior vice president at SKDKnickerbocker.
