= Gale D. Candaras =

American politician

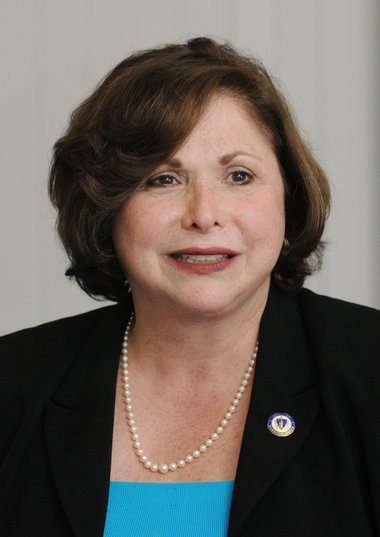

Member of the Massachusetts Senate from the First Hampden and Hampshire district
- In office January 3, 2007 – January 6, 2015
- Preceded by: Brian Lees
- Succeeded by: Eric Lesser

Personal details
- Born: January 1, 1949 (age 77) Brooklyn, New York
- Party: Democratic
- Spouse: Arthur Wolf
- Education: Teaneck High School; Fairleigh Dickinson University; Western New England University School of Law
- Occupation: Attorney

Gale D. Candaras (born January 1, 1949) is an American politician who served as a Democratic member of the Massachusetts Senate from 2006 to 2014, representing the First Hampden and Hampshire District. She is an attorney and a former five-term member of the Massachusetts House of Representatives, where she served as a Division Leader.

Candaras was born in 1949 in Brooklyn, New York and grew up in Teaneck, New Jersey, graduating from Teaneck High School in 1967. She attended Fairleigh Dickinson University (where she graduated magna cum laude), and, in 1983, she graduated from Western New England College School of Law with a Juris Doctor. After law school, Senator Candaras worked for the Equity Trading and Arbitrage Division at Goldman Sachs in New York City. She is licensed to practice law in New York, New Jersey, Connecticut and Massachusetts. In 1987, she moved to Wilbraham, where she practiced law and held positions on the Town planning board and finance committee and served for six years on the Board of Selectmen before being elected to the Massachusetts House of Representatives in 1996. She was elected to the Massachusetts State Senate in 2006. Senator Candaras served the First Hampden and Hampshire District, which covered her hometown of Wilbraham, a portion of the City of Springfield, the Towns of Longmeadow, East Longmeadow, Ludlow, Granby, Hampden, Belchertown, and a portion of the City of Chicopee.

In February 2012, Senator Candaras was appointed by Senate President Therese Murray to chair the Joint Committee on Economic Development and Emerging Technologies. She also served as Vice Chair of the Joint Committee on the Judiciary and sits on the Joint Committees on Financial Services, Ways and Means, and Transportation as well as the Senate Committees on Post Audit and Oversight, Ways and Means, and Global Warming and Climate Change. She has previously served as Chair of the Joint Committees on Revenue and Mental Health and Substance Abuse.

Candaras announced a run for Hampden County Register of Probate in January 2014, and did not seek re-election to her Senate seat. On November 4, 2014, she was defeated by Suzanne Seguin by 278 votes.

Candaras was the commencement speaker for the first graduate and professional degree commencement at Western New England University on May 7, 2015. She was awarded a Doctor Humane Letters Degree, LHD, in recognition of her lifetime of exceptional achievements.

On May 14, 2017 Candaras gave the commencement address at the 131st graduation ceremony at Springfield College, where she helped to establish the Candaras Davison Center for Inclusion to provide support for deaf people with intellectual disabilities. At the ceremony Candaras was awarded a Doctor of Humanics.

She is married to Arthur Wolf, a professor at Western New England University School of Law and former attorney with the Civil Rights Division of the United States Department of Justice and staff attorney to Congressman Father Robert Drinan. Candaras has one son.

== See also ==
- Massachusetts House of Representatives' 12th Hampden district
