= Maxwell House Haggadah =

Passover Haggadah published by the Maxwell House company

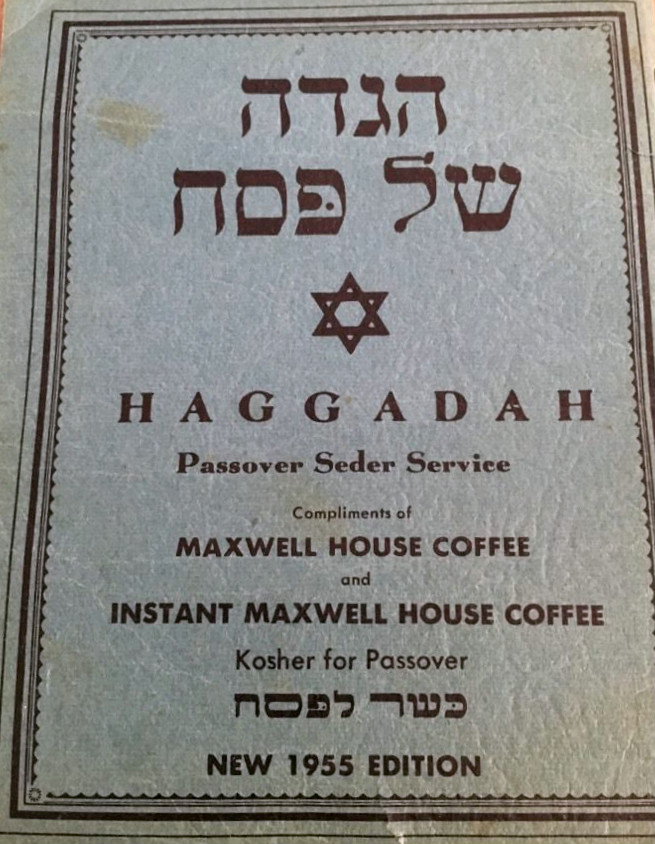
1955 edition

The Maxwell House Haggadah is an English–Hebrew Passover Haggadah introduced by the Maxwell House company as a marketing promotion in 1932 and printed continuously since that time. With over 50 million copies in print, it is the best known and most popular Haggadah among American Jews, and is considered a cultural icon. It is used at Passover Seders in homes, schools, senior centers, prisons, and the United States Army, and was the edition used by President Obama and his guests at the White House Passover Seder conducted yearly from 2009 to 2016. In 2011 a new English translation replaced archaic phrases in the original and also incorporated gender-neutral language.

== History ==
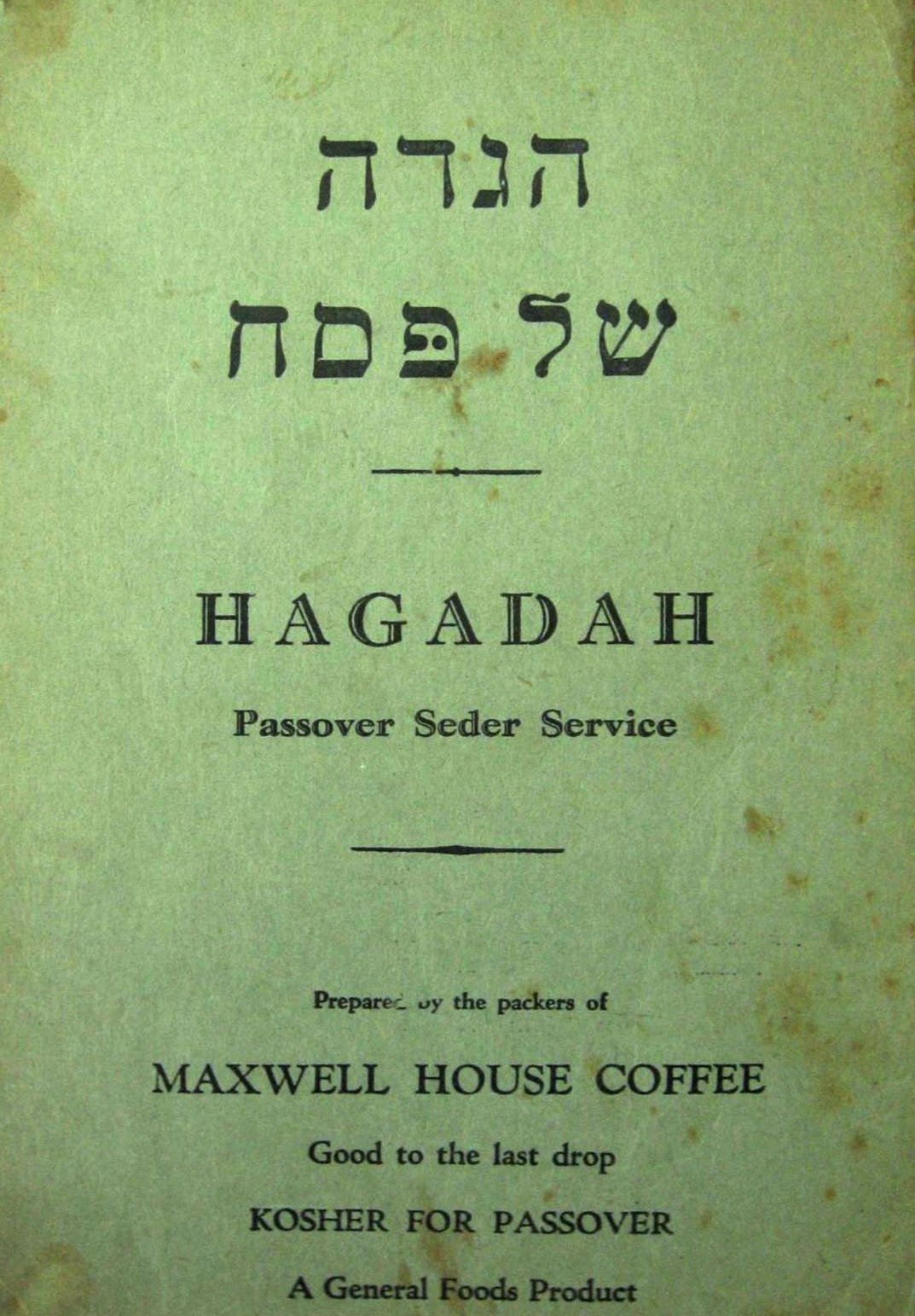
1933 edition

Inside the 1933 edition

A Haggadah is a ritual Jewish text containing prayers, hymns, Midrashic statements, and commentary on the story of Passover – the Jewish holiday celebrating the liberation of the Israelites from slavery in ancient Egypt. This text is recited by participants at a Passover Seder. The Haggadah has appeared in print since the 15th century and thousands of editions have been published.

The Maxwell House Haggadah debuted in 1932 as part of a marketing campaign for Maxwell House kosher-for-Passover coffee by Joseph Jacobs Advertising originally of New York City and currently based in Teaneck, New Jersey. Copies were distributed in-store with the purchase of Maxwell House Coffee. While other kosher for Passover food companies – such as Manischewitz and Streit's – also distributed their own Haggadahs, the Maxwell House Haggadah became the best known and most widely used in American Jewish homes. Carole B. Balin, professor of Jewish history, contends that this popularity was due to three factors:

1. The growing need for a Haggadah by American Jews interested in conducting a Passover Seder but having little familiarity with religious observance
2. The easy availability of the Maxwell House Haggadah, acquired via "a trip to the local supermarket"
3. The simple, "user-friendly" English and Hebrew layout

Fenster notes that until the introduction of the Maxwell House Haggadah, American families purchased new and different Haggadahs each year for their Passover Seder guests. The easy availability and textual consistency of each year's Maxwell House Haggadah made it ideal for expanding the family's Haggadah collection.

The Maxwell House Haggadah has been issued each year since 1932, with a two-year break during World War II due to paper shortages. As of April 2020, the Haggadah has distributed over 60 million copies. Maxwell House collaborated with Amazon in 2019 to create a Marvelous Mrs. Maisel–based Haggadah, which uniquely contained a recipe card for "Midge's Brisket."

== Description ==
The 1932 edition gave equal prominence to the complete Hebrew text and its English translation, placing them in parallel columns, and conveyed authenticity and adherence to tradition by opening from right to left in the manner of a Hebrew book. Instructions for conducting the Seder appeared on the English side only and references to biblical verses cited in the text were on the Hebrew side. The Haggadah presents only the text and directions for conducting the Seder, without exegesis.

The original English translation, by an unknown translator, contained "formal 'thees' and 'thous', masculine God language, and gender-specific references to a male reader". The archaic language used at the time rendered such translations as this reply to the Fourth Son: "But as for him who hath no capacity to inquire, thou must begin the narration as it is said". The limited illustrations in the original were from the 1695 Amsterdam Haggadah, rendered in neoclassical style. An advertisement for Maxwell House coffee inside the back cover, and the company's name on the front cover and in introductions, are the only advertisements.

In the 1960s a "DeLuxe" edition with an azure cover was introduced. This edition also initiated an Ashkenazic transliteration for those who could not read the Hebrew text. In 2000 the Haggadah switched its illustrations from sketches to photographs of a multigenerational family sitting at their Seder table. The cover similarly showed these models, a move away from the monochrome covers of the previous 40 years. According to Joseph Jacobs Advertising, this emphasis on the traditional look of a Passover Seder was in response to the trend of American Jews dissociating from religious observance.

=== Gender-neutral translation ===
In 2011, the Maxwell House Haggadah introduced a new English translation which replaced the archaic phrases in the original and also incorporated gender-neutral language. The 58-page reissue replaced the formal thee, thou, wherefore, and saith with You, why, and say. It refers to God as "Monarch" instead of "King" and as "Parent" instead of "Father", and replaces the familiar "Four Sons" with "four different sorts of children". The translation was done by Henry Frisch of Teaneck, New Jersey, a high school English teacher. No alterations were made in the traditional Hebrew text.

== Cultural icon ==
Originally a "dull green", the cover was changed to an azure background in the 1960s. This Haggadah, featuring the "Good to the Last Drop" logo and the words "Maxwell House Haggadah" on a plain blue background, became a cultural icon. American Jews who remember using the Maxwell House Haggadah in their childhood homes consider it a tradition, continuing to use it at their own families' Passover Seders. In 1997 the Hallmark company reproduced the familiar blue cover of the Maxwell House Haggadahs on one of its Passover greeting cards, which described them as "cultural icons – prized family possessions that have been handed down through the generations and are a warm reminder of the past".

== Distribution and use ==
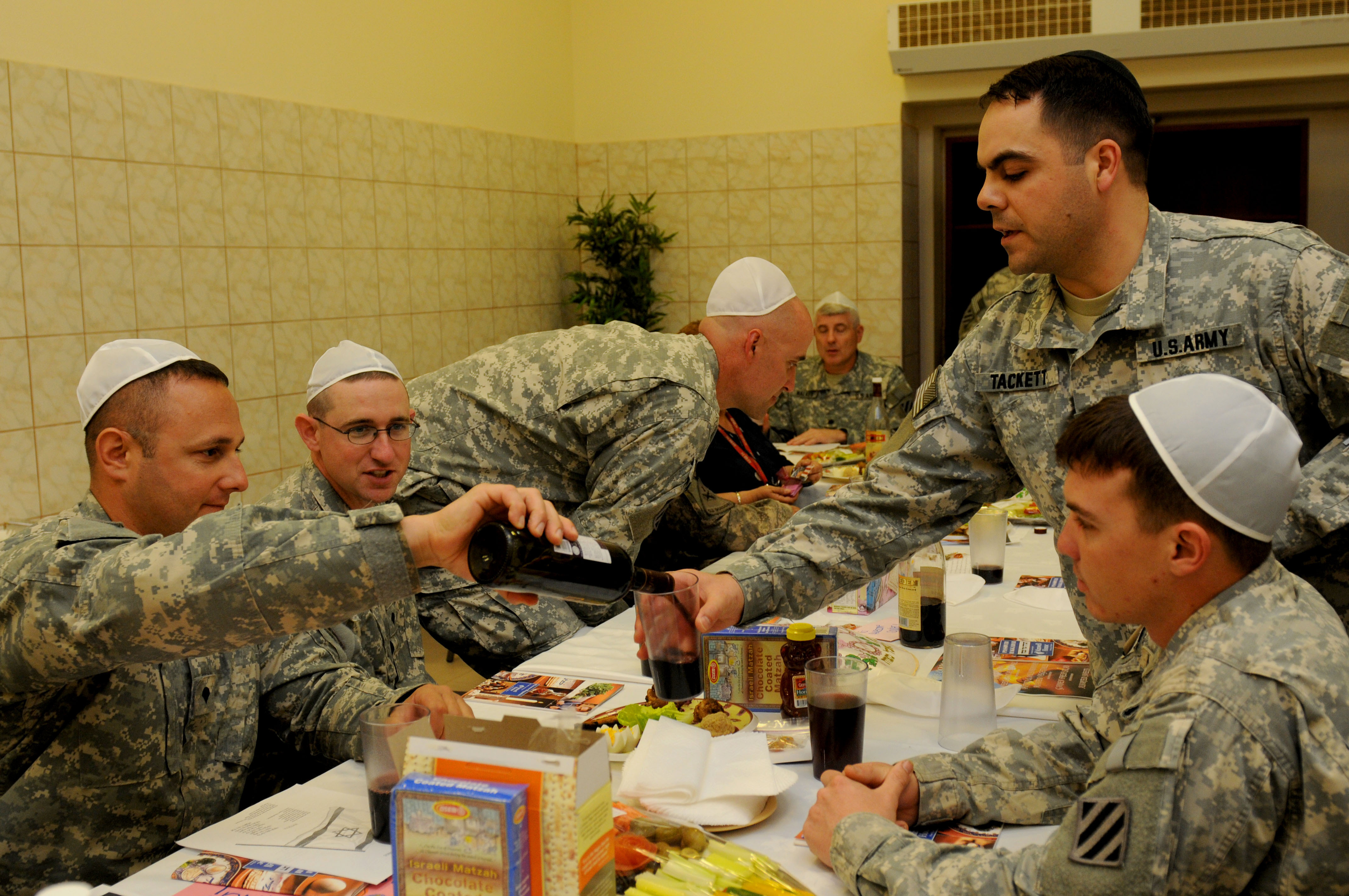
U.S. servicemen at Contingency Operating Base Speicher, Iraq, conduct a Passover Seder using the Maxwell House Haggadah, March 2010

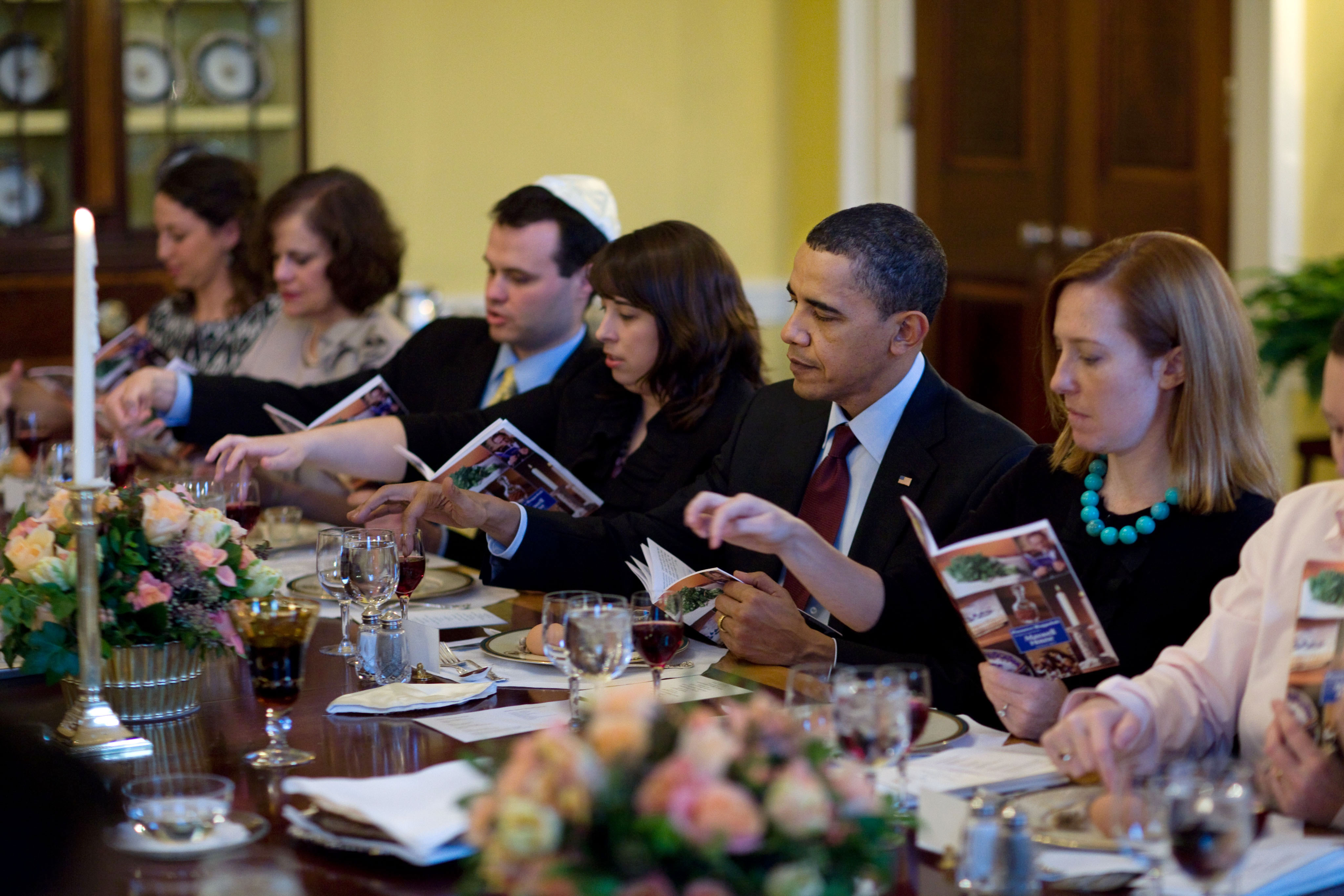
President Barack Obama and guests read from the Maxwell House Haggadah at the 2010 White House Passover Seder

The Maxwell House Haggadah is "the most widely used Haggadah in the world", with an estimated 50 million copies in print as of 2011. One million copies were distributed in 2006 and 2011. The Maxwell House Haggadah is distributed only in the United States. It has been distributed in national U.S. supermarket chains such as A&P and King Kullen, at Shop-Rite and Pathmark stores serving Jewish neighborhoods in the northeastern United States, and at independent groceries. Copies are available with the purchase of Maxwell House coffee. Some 5,000 to 10,000 copies are mailed to customers who pay for shipping.

The Maxwell House Haggadah is used at Passover Seders in homes, schools, senior centers, and prisons. The United States Army has issued it to soldiers in every military campaign since the 1930s. It was used in underground Seders in the Soviet Union, and by President Barack Obama and his guests at the annual White House Passover Seder during his presidency from 2009 to 2016.
