= White House Passover Seder =

2009–2016 annual White House dinner

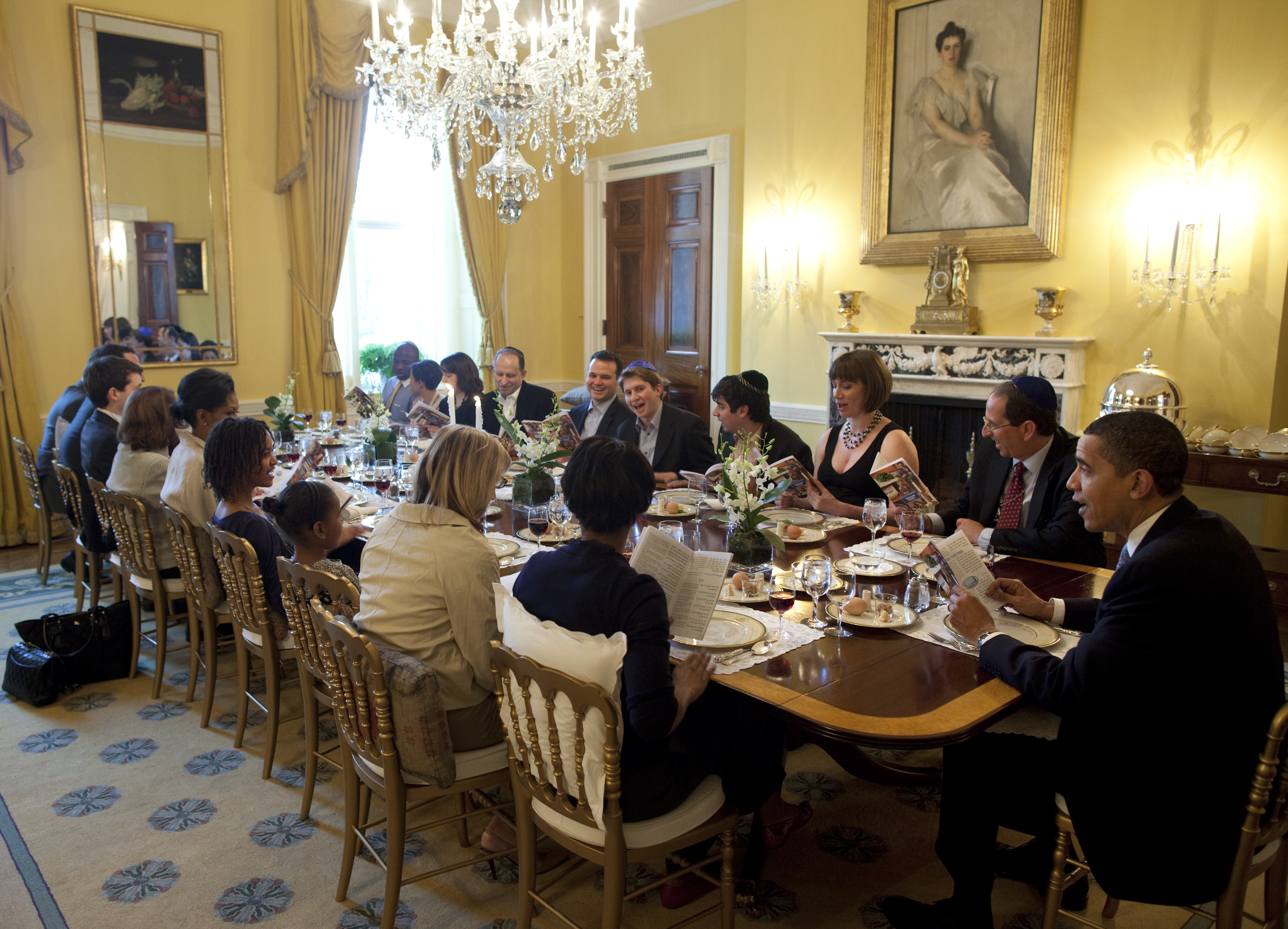
The Obamas host the first White House Passover Seder in 2009, in the Family Dining Room

The White House Passover Seder was an annual private dinner held at the White House on the Jewish holiday of Passover during the presidency of Barack Obama. Obama initiated it in 2009 for his family, staff members, friends, and their families. The gathering recited the Passover Haggadah, discussed the themes of the Passover Seder and their relation to current events, and partook of a holiday-themed meal. Obama hosted and attended the Seder each year from 2009 to 2016. It was the first Passover Seder to be conducted by a sitting U.S. president in the White House.

== Background ==
A Passover Seder is a ritual meal held by Jews on the first two nights of the Passover holiday (first night only in Israel). The Seder is traditionally conducted in the home by the family and their invited guests, although it may also be held by any group of Jews, such as members of a synagogue, condominium complex, student group, army base, etc. At the Seder, participants read the Haggadah, a ritual text recounting the liberation of the Israelites from slavery in ancient Egypt. The reading is accompanied by visual aids in the form of the symbolic foods on the Passover Seder Plate. A festive meal is part of the ritual. While religious Jewish law places certain restrictions on a non-Jew eating at a Seder, non-traditional Jews often invite non-Jews to their Seders, and non-Jews also conduct Seders of their own, although the latter practice is highly controversial.

== History ==
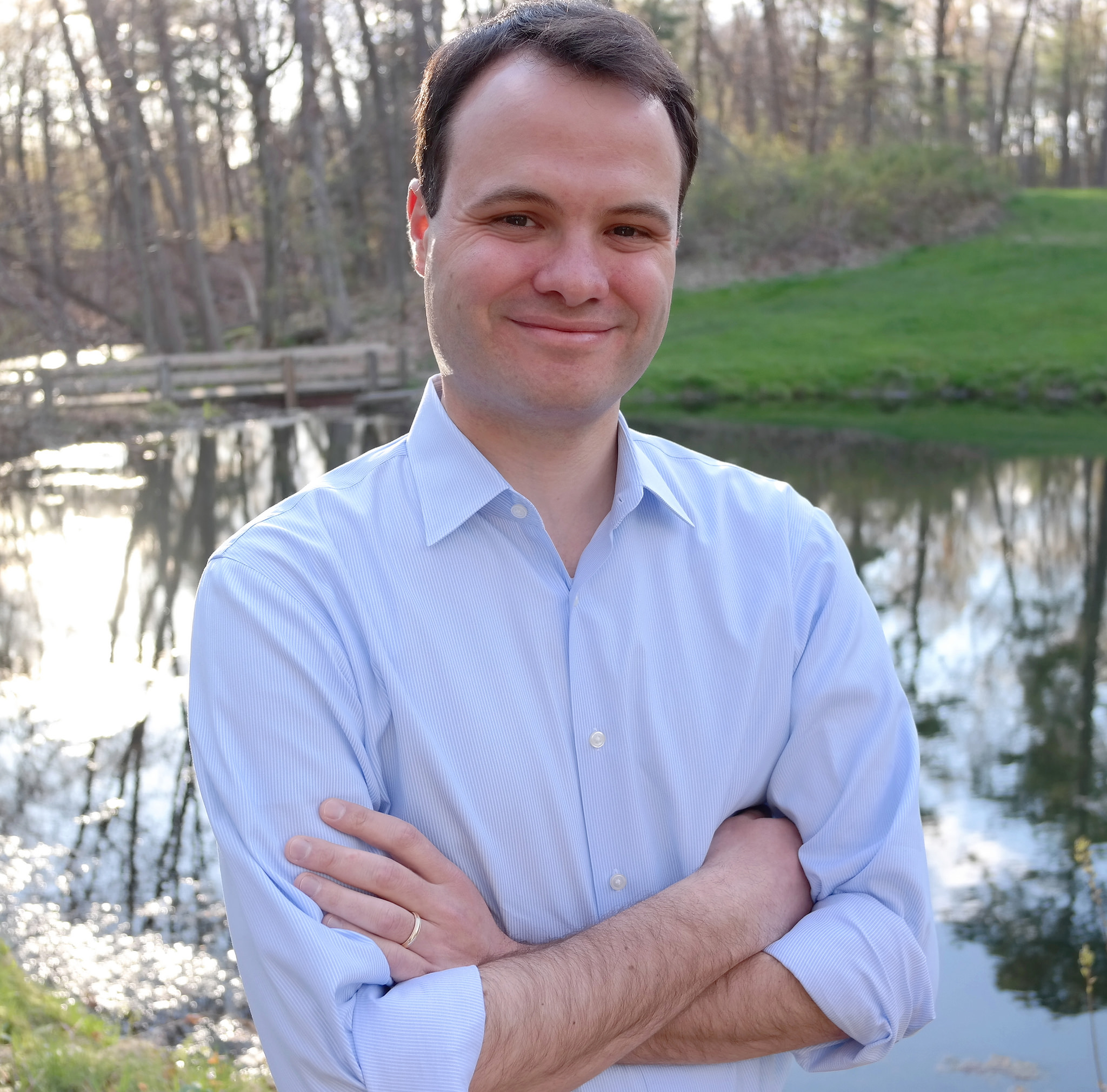
Eric Lesser

The White House Passover Seder had its origins in an informal Passover Seder conducted on April 19, 2008, by three junior staff members of then-presidential candidate Barack Obama's campaign. At the time, Obama and his campaign team were in Harrisburg, Pennsylvania, in advance of the Pennsylvania primary, and the Jewish staffers realized they would not be able to go home to be with their families on Seder night. The three staffers – Eric Lesser, Herbie Ziskend, and Arun Chaudhary – obtained a "Passover kit" with wine, matzo, macaroons, and Haggadahs from the Hillel House at the University of Pennsylvania and were conducting a late-night Seder in a meeting room of the Sheraton Hotel in Harrisburg when Obama walked in. "Hey, is this the Seder?" Obama asked. He and a group of aides, all non-Jews, joined in to recite the Haggadah. Obama was familiar with the ritual, having attended Passover Seders for the previous nine years. At the end of the Seder, when the assembled said the traditional wish, "Next year in Jerusalem", Obama added, "Next year in the White House".

The following year, with Obama elected president and his junior staffers working in the White House, Obama encouraged the group to hold the Seder again. The 2009 event was the first time that a sitting U.S. president conducted a Passover Seder in the White House. The White House switchboard was reportedly swamped with callers seeking a dinner invitation. The White House Seder was scheduled for the second night of Passover to allow Jewish staffers to spend the first Seder on the first night of Passover with their families. About 20 guests sat around a table in the Old Family Dining Room reading the Haggadah and sampling the traditional Seder foods. Malia and Sasha Obama, being the youngest in attendance, recited the Four Questions and engaged in the search for the afikoman.

Obama hosted the White House Passover Seder for all eight years of his administration. Among the annual traditions for the White House Seder were Obama's imitation of Pharaoh, Chaudhary's speech on the Hillel sandwich, and the hiding of the afikoman under the watchful eye of a Secret Service member. The Seder convened in the Old Family Dining Room and lasted for two hours. During Obama's last year in office in 2016, the Seder was held on April 26, the sixth day of Passover, due to Obama's previously scheduled visit to Saudi Arabia on the first and second nights of Passover.

== Themes ==
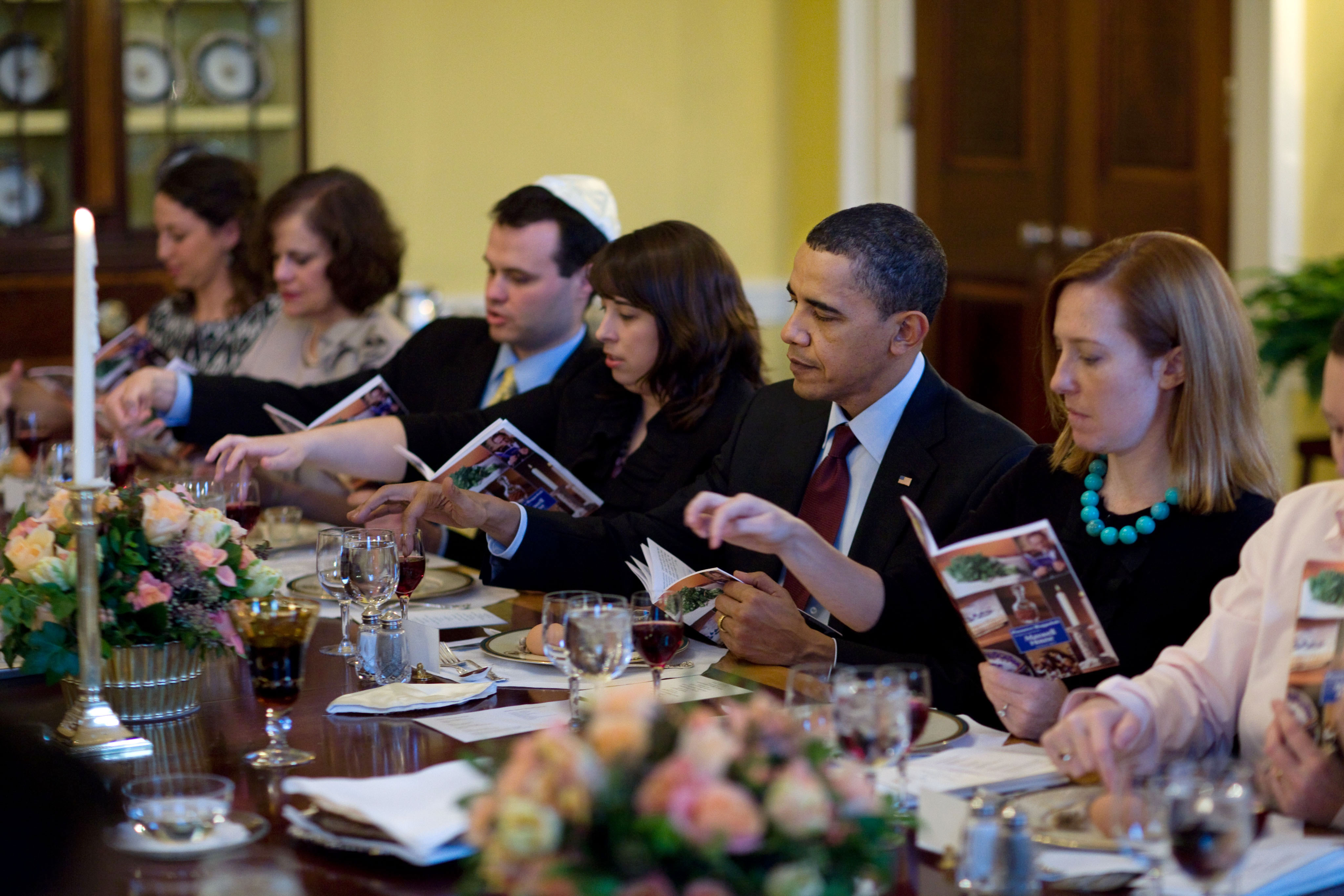
2010 White House Passover Seder

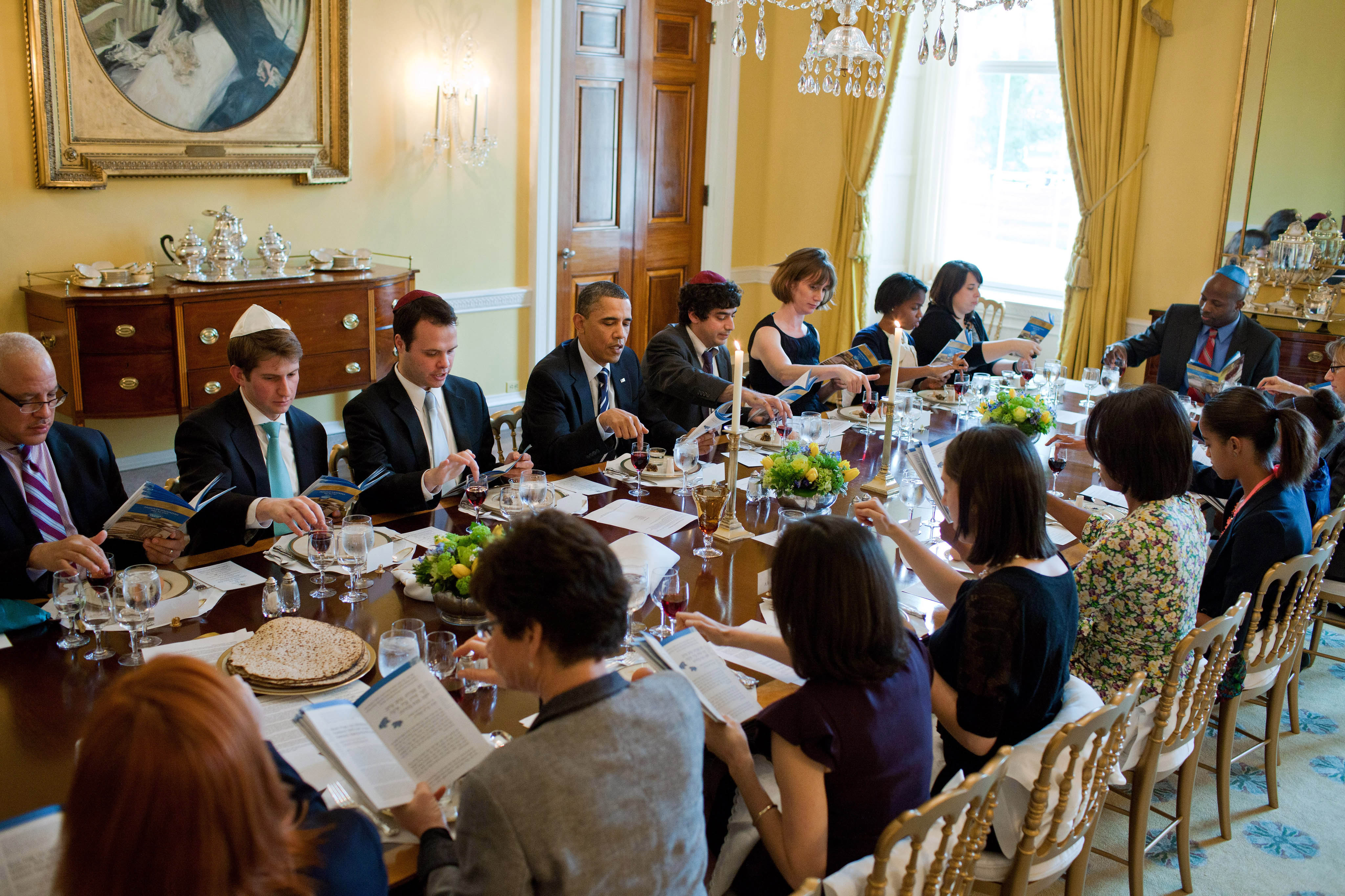
2011 White House Passover Seder

During a visit to Israel in 2013, Obama stated that he brought the Passover Seder to the White House to acquaint his daughters with the story of the Exodus, whose themes resonated with his personal beliefs. He said:

To African Americans, the story of the Exodus was perhaps the central story, the most powerful image about emerging from the grip of bondage to reach for liberty and human dignity – a tale that was carried from slavery through the Civil Rights Movement into today. For me, personally, growing up in far-flung parts of the world and without firm roots, the story spoke to a yearning within every human being for a home.

The White House Seder participants, many of them African Americans, were cognizant of the similarities between the story of the Israelites' Exodus from Egypt and the American civil rights movement. The themes of social justice, struggle, and freedom were often evoked during discussion at the meal. At the point in the ritual when the prophet Elijah is welcomed to the meal, the guests recited the Emancipation Proclamation.

The choice of serving pieces was also symbolic. In 2009, the group used silverware from the Truman administration, remembering Truman as the first President to recognize Israel. In 2013, Israel First Lady Sara Netanyahu gave as a gift a Seder Plate, which was used each year at the dinner. Those in attendance read from the Maxwell House Haggadah, which is widely used in Jewish homes.

== Menu ==
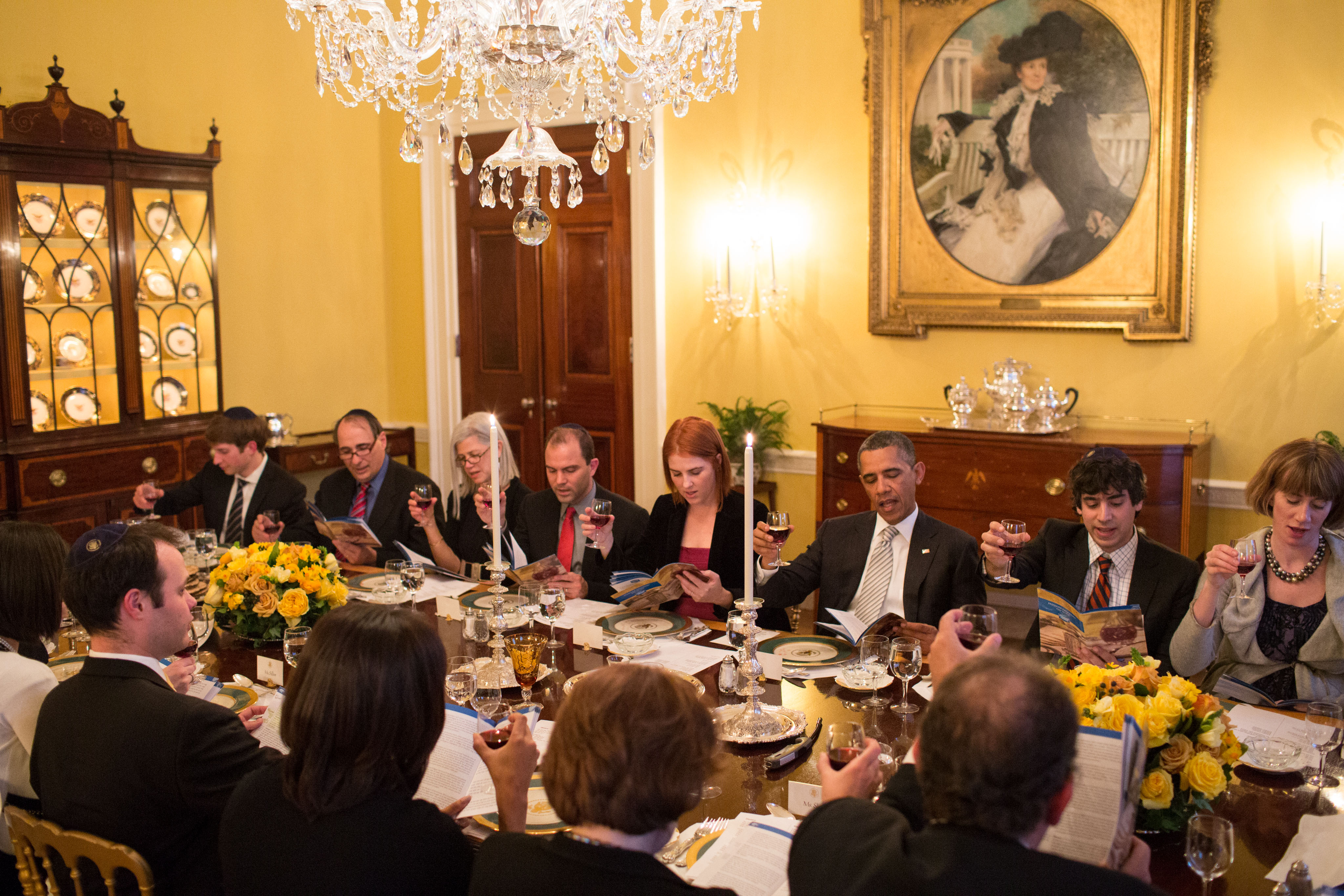
2013 White House Passover Seder

The menu at the White House Passover Seder featured traditional American Jewish Passover cuisine such as gefilte fish, charoset, chicken soup with matzah balls, brisket, potato kugel, and macaroons. Salads and vegetable side dishes completed the menu. Lesser brought handmade shmurah matzah from the Chabad-Lubavitch center in Springfield, Massachusetts. Family recipes were emphasized: in 2015, these recipes included matzo ball soup from Ziskend's grandmother, carrot soufflé from Lesser's mother, and Raspberry Ganache Marjolaine from Chaudhary's mother. Recipes covered foods from both the Ashkenazic and Sephardic traditions. The food was not strictly kosher, but kosher style. In 2014, the White House Passover Seder began inviting a guest chef to coordinate the menu with the White House executive chef.

== Guest list ==
Unlike the White House Hanukkah Party, Obama's White House Passover Seder was not a political event. The guest list did not include rabbinical figures, Jewish lobbyists, members of Congress, or Israeli representatives. The guest list of approximately 20 remained basically the same each year. Attendees included the president and his family, members of the president's and first lady's staff and their families, and friends of the Obamas, with a mix of Jews and non-Jews.

== Other White House Seders ==
In April 1993 staffers of President Clinton conducted a Passover Seder in the Indian Treaty Room of the Eisenhower Executive Office Building, in the absence of the President.

On April 10, 2017, the first night of Passover, several Trump Administration staffers conducted a Seder in the Eisenhower Executive Office Building, but unlike during the Obama Administration, neither President Trump nor his family members attended the ritual.

== See also ==
- White House Hanukkah Party
