= Hanukkah stamp =

A Hanukkah stamp is a holiday stamp issued to commemorate Hanukkah. Since 1996, several Hanukkah-themed postage stamps have been issued, often jointly.

== Description ==
A Hanukkah stamp is a holiday postage stamp issued to commemorate the Jewish holiday Hanukkah.

== History ==
=== Israel ===
The United States Postal Service (USPS) issued a 32-cent Hanukkah stamp in 1996 with a menorah design as a joint issue with Israel Post. A menorah design was also used in 2008 for a forever stamp issued jointly with USPS. In 2012, a stamp sheet commemorating Hanukkah was issued jointly with India Post.

=== United States ===
The United States Postal Service has released several Hanukkah-themed postage stamps.

==== 1996 ====
The 1996 Hanukkah USA 32 cents stamp

The United States Postal Service (USPS) issued a 32-cent Hanukkah stamp in 1996 as a joint issue with Israel. This initial printing produced 103.5 million stamps and in 1997 there was a re-issue. It is regarded as the first Jewish stamp issued by the US Postal service and noted by most experts and dealers of these kind of stamps.

The U.S. Postal Service unveiled a new series of "Holiday Celebration" stamps in 1996 with the debut of the first stamp commemorating the Jewish holiday of Chanukah, the Jewish Festival of Lights. The Chanukah stamp is the first U.S. stamp to recognize a Jewish holiday. Jointly issued with Israel, both countries feature the same design. The U.S. version contains the English spelling of "Hanukkah" and the Israeli stamp features the Hebrew spelling. The Chanukah stamp was designed by Hannah Smotrich, a graphic designer and instructor at the Corcoran School of Art in Washington, D.C., and Board Member of the Washington Chapter - American Institute of Graphic Arts. Smotrich created the stamp design using pieces of cut colored paper, a medium she has used to create cards for family and friends. Smotrich paid particular attention to the choice of colors for the candles and background "to emphasize the upbeat nature of a playful, joyous holiday." The U.S. Postal Service will issue a new Holiday Celebrations series stamp each year reflecting a different cultural or ethnic holiday. The Postal Service will print 142 million of the Chanukah stamps.

Thus, that stamp and the year it was first issued, 1996, was historic, and was part of a turnaround, as explained:

In 1962 the United States Postal Service issued Its first Christmas Stamp and has been issuing new and different Christmas stamps every year since then. Beginning in 1965 and every year (with 3 exceptions) since then the USPS has issued a Christmas stamp with a religious theme (predominantly the "Madonna & Child"). After years of refusing to issue a Hanukkah stamp, citing specific religious reference as the reason (while claiming the "Madonna & Child" stamps were merely art masterpiece reproductions), the United States Postal Service issued its first Hanukkah stamp in 1996. This only after, in November of 1994, the USPS announced it would discontinue the "Madonna & Child" Christmas because of its specific religious theme. And, within a week "Bowing to public pressure" reversed that decision. I'm sure the "pressure" came from Catholic organizations. Although a U.S. Hanukkah stamp has been "available" every year since 1996 it had been the same design through 2003. It was recycled leftovers from the previous year, or a revalued version as postal rates increased. During the same period of time there was a new "Madonna & Child" stamp almost every year (the exceptions being 2000 just before a rate increase in January 2001, and in 2003 supposedly to reduce stamp production costs). In 2004 the United States Postal Service issued the first new Hanukkah stamp design since 1996. During the same period of time the USPS issued seven new "Madonna & Child" Christmas stamps and eight new Chinese New Year stamps...

The stamp was reissued in 1999 with a 33-cent denomination, followed in 2001 at 34 cents and 2002 at 37 cents.

==== 2004 ====
In 2004 after 8 years of reissuing the menorah design, the USPS issued a dreidel design for the Hanukkah stamp with a 37-cent denomination. The dreidel design was used through 2008, with changes in denomination to 39 cents in 2006, 41 cents in 2007 and 42 cents in 2008.

==== 2008 ====
A menorah design was used in 2008 for a forever stamp issued jointly with Israel Post.

==== 2009 ====
The 2009 Hanukkah design features a photograph of a menorah with nine lit candles and a 44-cent denomination. The menorah was designed by Lisa Regan of the Garden Deva Sculpture Company in Tulsa, OK, and photographed by Ira Wexler of Braddock Heights, MD. Garden Deva was commissioned by the U.S. Postal Service to design and fabricate the menorah. After the reveal ceremony in New York City on October 9, the stamp was made available nationwide at all post offices.

==== 2011 ====
In 2011, the Hanukkah stamp was redesigned with the word "Hanukkah" broken into eight boxes, one of which (the second K) is in the shape of a dreidel. The denomination was 44 cents.

==== 2013 ====
In 2013, the USPS issued a revamped Hanukkah menorah design on a brown background as a forever stamp with an effective 46 cent denomination. The stamp was redesigned and issued in 2016 with a blue background and an effective 47-cent denomination.
