= Eric Lesser =

American politician

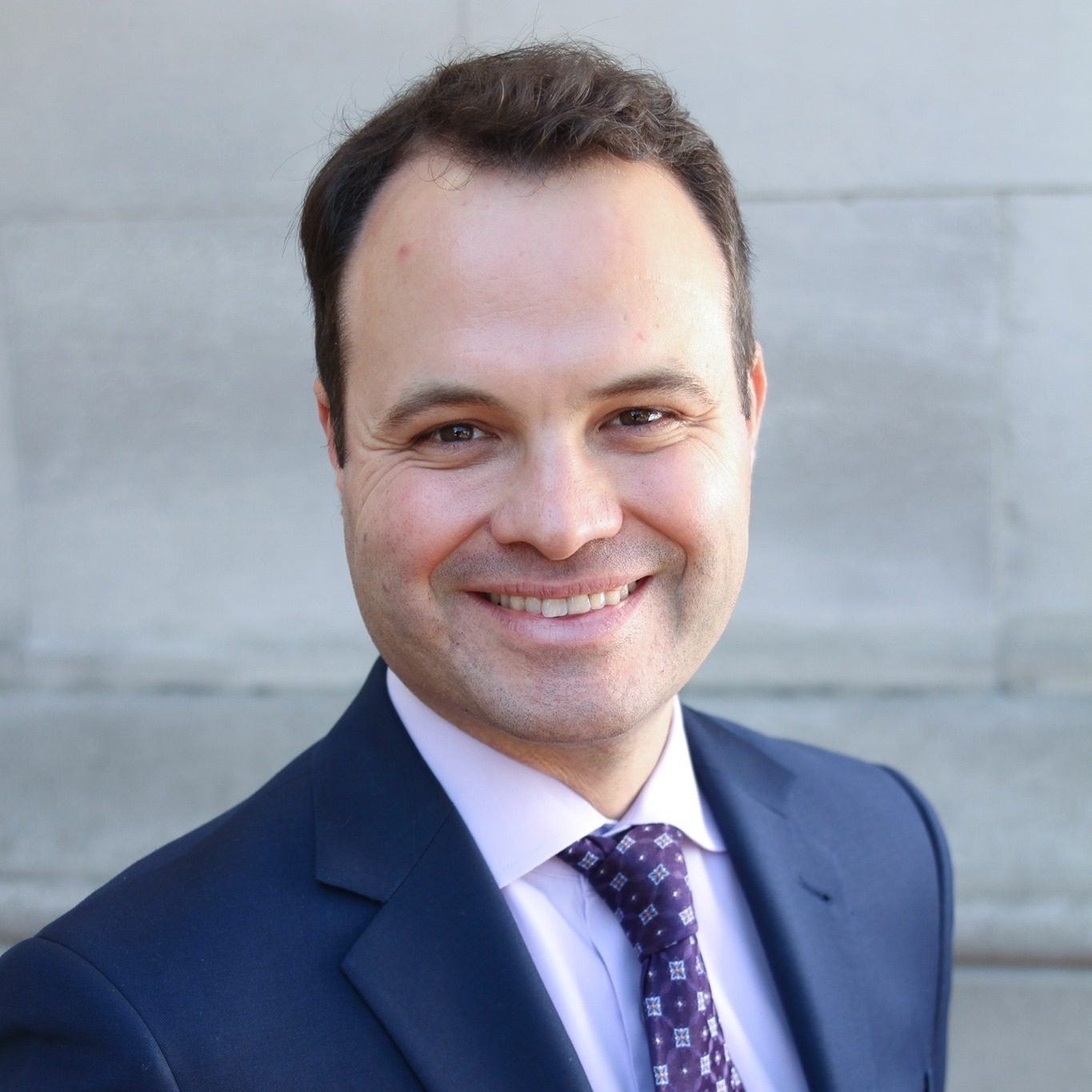

Member of the Massachusetts Senate from the 1st Hampden and Hampshire district
- In office January 7, 2015 – January 4, 2023
- Preceded by: Gale D. Candaras
- Succeeded by: Jacob Oliveira

Personal details
- Born: Eric Philip Lesser; February 27, 1985 (age 41) Longmeadow, Massachusetts, U.S.
- Party: Democratic
- Spouse: Alison Silber (m. 2011)
- Education: Harvard University (BA, JD)

Eric Philip Lesser (born February 27, 1985) is an American lawyer and politician who was a member of the Massachusetts Senate from 2015 to 2023. Before representing his hometown of Longmeadow, Massachusetts, and neighboring communities in the Greater-Springfield area, he worked as a White House aide during the Obama administration. Lesser is one of the originators of the White House Passover Seder. In the 2022 Massachusetts race for Lieutenant Governor, Lesser lost the Democratic primary to Kim Driscoll.

While in the State Senate, Lesser advocated for a high-speed rail connection between eastern and western Massachusetts. He proposed and passed the Student Loan Borrower Bill of Rights as well as provisions for job training, tourism and the arts, substance abuse treatment, and environmental issues, among others.

== Early life and education ==
Lesser grew up in Longmeadow, Massachusetts, and graduated from Longmeadow High School. While in high school, Lesser worked with students, parents, and teachers to increase school funding and prevent lay offs. He also worked for Congressman Richard Neal and Senator Ted Kennedy. Lesser was an active member of Sinai Temple, coordinating volunteer activities for high school students, and an active volunteer with the Longmeadow Democratic Town Committee.

Lesser's father, Martin, is a family doctor in Holyoke, Massachusetts. His father is a member of the Massachusetts National Guard and in 2010, served a tour of duty in Iraq. Lesser's mother, Joan, is a social worker in Holyoke.

After high school, Lesser received his bachelor's degree in government from Harvard College. While in college, Lesser worked on Deval Patrick's gubernatorial campaign. He led the Harvard College Democrats and a policy group on Congressional Redistricting Reform. At Harvard University's Institute of Politics, he started a public policy research program.

Lesser returned to Harvard after his work on Barack Obama's 2008 presidential campaign and in the Obama White House. He received his J.D. from Harvard Law School, where Business Insider named Lesser one of the "most impressive Harvard Law students."

== 2008 campaign & the White House ==
=== Obama presidential campaign ===
After college, Lesser joined Barack Obama's 2008 presidential campaign, helping stage events in New Hampshire. Following Obama's near victory in the New Hampshire Democratic primary, Lesser was tapped to be the campaign's "Ground Logistics Coordinator." In that position, he traveled with then-Senator Obama to 47 states and six countries—over 200,000 miles in total. Lesser created a luggage-management system that earned him the trust of the campaign team, the traveling press, and his future boss, Obama advisor David Axelrod. Reflecting on Lesser's logistical prowess, President Obama said, "Eric Lesser may be running a Fortune 500 company one day," adding "we are lucky to have such a smart and committed young man as part of our team."

During a campaign stop in Harrisburg, Pennsylvania, Lesser organized an impromptu Passover Seder. When Obama arrived, he promised: "Next year in the White House."

=== White House aide ===
When the campaign ended, the Senior Advisor to President Obama, David Axelrod, tapped Lesser to serve as his Special Assistant. For two years, Lesser shared a wall with the Oval Office. The Washington Post described Lesser as a "wunderkind," and the New York Times called him a "West Wing mascot." In 2011, Lesser became the Director of Strategic Planning at the Council of Economic Advisers. In the White House unit charged with offering the President objective economic advice, Lesser coordinated the communications strategy behind the economic recovery and historic job creation of the Obama administration.

=== White House Seder ===
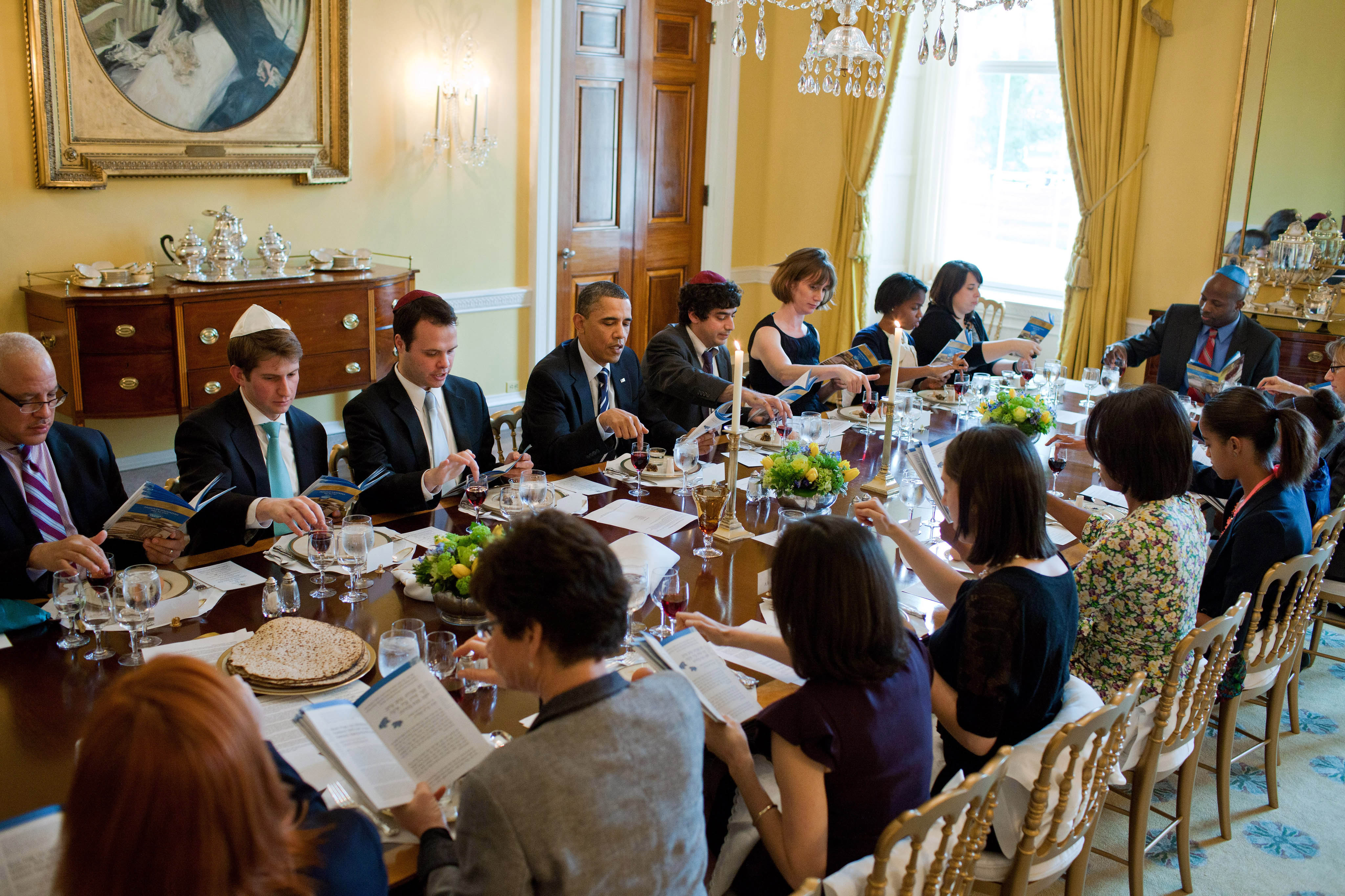
2011 White House Passover Seder

Lesser was a chief organizer of the first presidential Seder in American history. The annual White House Passover Seder was attended by President Barack Obama, First Lady Michelle Obama, and their daughters. The Seder is a reunion of the original group who met in Harrisburg, Pennsylvania during the 2008 campaign.

== Massachusetts State Senate ==
=== Elections ===
On February 3, 2014, The Republican newspaper reported that Lesser was considering a bid for the First Hampden & Hampshire seat in the Massachusetts State Senate that was recently vacated by Sen. Gale Candaras. On February 18, 2014, Lesser announced his candidacy for Massachusetts State Senate. On September 9, Lesser won the five-way Democratic primary. On November 4, Lesser defeated Republican Debra Boronski and America First candidate Mike Franco to win the State Senate seat.

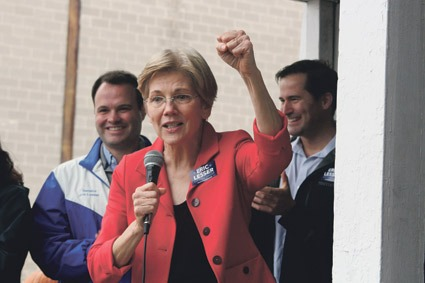
In 2016, Senator Eric Lesser hosted a campaign event in East Longmeadow with supporters U.S. Senator Elizabeth Warren and Congressman Seth Moulton.

Lesser launched his reelection bid in September 2016 after an uncontested Democratic primary. On November 8, 2016, Lesser defeated James "Chip" Harrington, earning 56 percent of the vote to Harrington's 44 percent. During the campaign, Lesser attracted a series of high-profile endorsements, including both U.S. Senators from Massachusetts, Elizabeth Warren and Ed Markey; U.S. Representatives Richard Neal, Joe Kennedy III, and Seth Moulton; former Massachusetts Governor Michael Dukakis; and Springfield, Massachusetts mayor Domenic Sarno. Notably, Lesser earned the endorsement of his former boss, President Barack Obama, who only endorsed 161 candidates nationwide that year. That year, Obama endorsed no other candidate in Massachusetts. Lesser was sworn in for a second term in the Massachusetts State Senate on January 4, 2017.

Lesser won his third and fourth elections to the Massachusetts State Senate in 2018 and 2020, running uncontested each time in the Democratic primary and general election.

==== 2022 lieutenant gubernatorial election ====
In January 2022, Lesser announced his campaign for lieutenant governor of Massachusetts. If elected, he would be the first Jewish person and the first millennial to be lieutenant governor or governor in Massachusetts. He would also be the first Democrat from western Massachusetts to serve in the role since 1853.

== Outside of the State House ==
Lesser holds a number of national recognitions, including a Rodel Fellowship in Public Leadership at the Aspen Institute. He is the co-chair of the Future of Work Initiative at NewDEAL, a national network of pro-growth, progressive state and local elected officials. He also sits on the advisory board of the Student Borrower Protection Center, an advocacy group for student loan borrowers. Lesser is a term member of the Council on Foreign Relations.

Lesser has taught workshops on campaigns, elections, and public policy at Harvard's Kennedy School of Government and a class on millennial leadership in local and state politics at the University of Massachusetts Amherst.

Lesser worked as a script consultant with HBO on the television show Veep for seven seasons.

== Personal life ==
Lesser married attorney Alison Silber on December 31, 2011. The couple has three children.

== Electoral history ==
In 2018 and 2020, Lesser did not face any opponents in the 1st Hampden and Hampshire Democratic Primary and General Election.

Massachusetts Lieutenant Governor Democratic Primary, 2022
| Party | Candidate | Votes | % |
|---|---|---|---|
| Democratic | Kimberley Driscoll | 332,712 | 46.6 |
| Democratic | Eric P. Lesser | 233,241 | 32.7 |
| Democratic | Tami Gouveia | 147,224 | 20.6 |
| Write-in | | 1,094 | 0.2 |
| Total votes | | 714,271 | 100.0 |

Massachusetts 1st Hampden and Hampshire General Election, 2016
| Party | Candidate | Votes | % |
|---|---|---|---|
| Democratic | Eric Philip Lesser | 44,602 | 55.8 |
| Republican | James Chip Harrington | 35,188 | 44.0 |
| Write-in | | 100 | 0.1 |
| Total votes | | 79,890 | 100.0 |

Massachusetts 1st Hampden and Hampshire General Election, 2014
| Party | Candidate | Votes | % |
|---|---|---|---|
| Democratic | Eric Philip Lesser | 28,153 | 50.4 |
| Republican | Debra A. Boronski | 24,964 | 44.7 |
| Independent Politician | Mike Franco | 2,705 | 4.8 |
| Write-in | | 85 | 0.2 |
| Total votes | | 23,360 | 100.0 |

Massachusetts 1st Hampden and Hampshire Democratic Primary, 2014
| Party | Candidate | Votes | % |
|---|---|---|---|
| Democratic | Eric Philip Lesser | 5,374 | 32.3 |
| Democratic | Timothy C. Allen | 5,182 | 31.2 |
| Democratic | James Chip Harrington | 4,189 | 25.2 |
| Democratic | Aaron L. Saunders | 1,406 | 8.5 |
| Democratic | Thomas A. Lachiusa | 430 | 2.6 |
| Write-in | | 32 | 0.2 |
| Total votes | | 16,616 | 100.00 |

== See also ==
- 2019–2020 Massachusetts legislature
- 2021–2022 Massachusetts legislature
