= Shmuel Butman =

American Chabad rabbi (1943–2024)

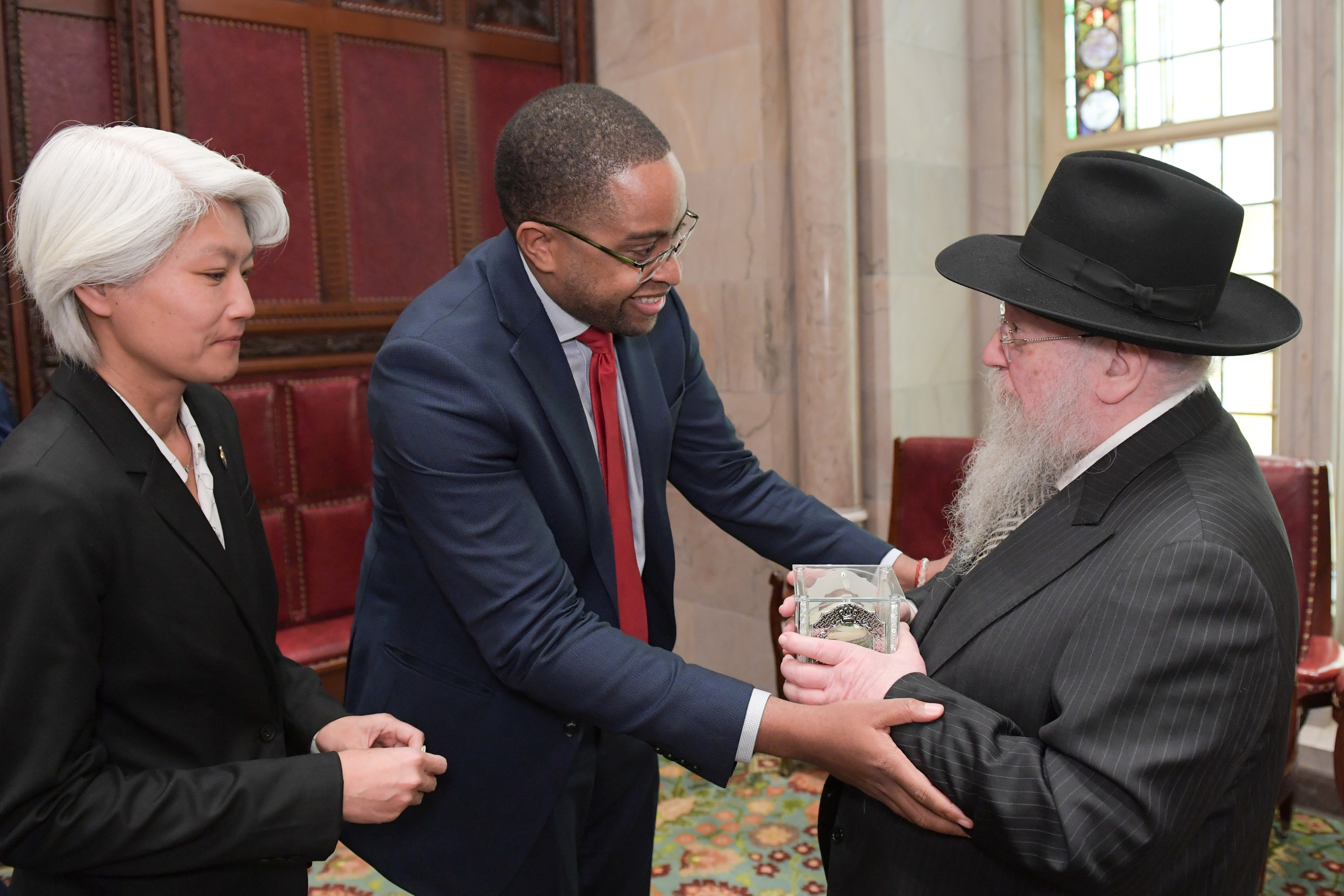
- Butman meets with Senator Zellnor Myrie
- Born: January 30, 1943; Soviet Union
- Died: July 22, 2024 (aged 81); New York City, U.S.
- Occupation: Director of Lubavitch Youth Organization

Rabbi Shmuel Menachem Mendel Butman (January 30, 1943 – July 22, 2024) was an American Chabad rabbi in Crown Heights, Brooklyn, New York. He was the director of Lubavitch Youth Organization.

== Activities ==
Butman was the chairman of the International Campaign to Bring Moshiach. He was the founder of the weekly Chabad magazine L'Chaim and made campaign contributions to former New York Mayor Rudy Giuliani.

He was the organizer of the annual Mitzvah Tank Parade. He also hosted a weekly radio show called Moshiach in the air and was the director of the weekly Chabad magazine L'Chaim from the 1980s on. His weekly "Challenge" column was published in the Jewish Press.

In 1992 he addressed the US House of Representatives at the invitation of Chuck Schumer, representing Chabad in honor of Schneerson's 90th birthday.

Butman was instrumental in establishing the annual public lighting of the World's Largest Menorah at Grand Army Plaza in Manhattan, New York City. Beginning in 1977, Butman led the organization of the event through the Lubavitch Youth Organization, overseeing its growth into a major public celebration of Hanukkah. He played a key role in commissioning the current 32-foot menorah, designed by Israeli artist Yaacov Agam, and regularly led the lighting ceremonies for decades.

=== Crown Heights riot ===
Butman gave a keynote address at the funeral of Yankel Rosenbaum. He praised the actions of the police but voiced anger against the rioters comparing their actions to European pogroms in the 19th century. "First Crown Heights, then Washington Heights, then the Golan Heights. This is a Jewish issue. What happened in Crown Heights was not an isolated incident." He commented: "This is not Poland in 1881. It's the United States in 1991!"

=== Messianism ===
Before Schneerson's death Butman was active in the movement to crown him as "King Messiah". He was seen as a leader of that movement, organizing rallies to bring about this proclamation. He invoked the recitation of the Yechi slogan in Schneerson's presence without him complaining as evidence that he was indeed the Messiah. He organized the rally on January 30, 1993, that was billed as Schneerson's coronation ceremony. Before the rally he informed the press that "This will be the coronation of the rebbe as Melech haMashiach (King Messiah)." Butman was forced to backtrack during the event, announcing that Schneerson's appearance did not represent his acceptance of the role of Messiah. He told the 8,000 assembled followers (plus many more around the world watching via satellite) that the event "is not to be interpreted as a coronation."

Butman penned a book outlining the religious and philosophical justification for believing that Schneerson was the messiah despite his death in 1995. He made the book freely available online.

When the Rabbinical Council of America denounced messianism within Chabad in 1996, Butman went on the offensive telling the press: "Rabbi Shmuel Butman, chairman of the International Campaign to Bring Moshiach, responded to the RCA by saying: "Questions of belief in Judaism are a matter of halachah [Jewish law] and should be referred to recognized Torah giants of the generation for a decision" adding that the resolution was "like voting against the rebbe".

He was widely viewed as a spokesman of the messianist strand within Chabad. He told the press in December 1994, after Schneerson's death:

"it is not some of the people in the community, but all of the people in the community as well as Lubavitch throughout the world, who believe...that the Rebbe will take us out of exile, and that the Rebbe will lead us to the great final redemption."

In later years he was less outspoken in his messianic beliefs. Since February 2008, he presented the weekly web-based Torah program "Shabbos Night Live" on mainstream Chabad websites COLlive.com and COL.org.il.

At the Birchas Hachama ceremony at 770 Eastern Parkway, he was the agreed upon candidate to emcee the rare event.

== Personal life and death ==
Rabbi Shmuel Butman was married to Rochel Butman, and they had six children. Several of his family members hold leadership positions within the Chabad movement in various communities across the United States. Rabbi Butman died on July 22, 2024, at the age of 81, from a heart attack.

== Bibliography ==
- Countdown to Moshiach: Can the rebbe still be Moshiach?, Shmuel Butman (unknown binding - 1995).
