= Samuel Turk =

Samuel A. Turk (1917–2009) was an American-born pulpit rabbi who wrote columns for decades in The Jewish Press. He was the rabbi of the Kingsbridge Center of Israel rabbi in Riverdale.

He studied at Yeshiva Torah Vodaath under Rabbi Shlomo Heiman and had a bachelor's degree from City College, a Masters from NYU, and a PhD from Yeshiva University.

== Issues and Organizations ==
Turk was the first president and a co-founder of the right-wing Igud HaRabbonim (Rabbinical Alliance of America).

He was one of the rabbis who marched in Washington, DC in 1943 to try to save the Jews of Europe who were being murdered by the Nazis in the Holocaust.

== Writings ==
He wrote approximately 1,500 columns for the Jewish Press and in 1973 he published a book of chidushei torah called Kerem Zvi.
