= Arnold Fine =

Editor of The Jewish Press, New York City

- Born: January 15, 1924
- Died: September 5, 2014 (aged 90)
- Occupations: Editor, Jewish Press humor columnist

Arnold Fine (January 15, 1924 – September 5, 2014) was an editor and columnist, known for editing The Jewish Press and a humor columnist.

He was known for his "I Remember When." For decades his writings, which included a companion feature titled "A Bi Gezunt," were on the back page, and subsequently on the inside of the back page.

He also published 2 volumes of Abi Gezunt

== Serious side ==
His I Remember When column at times wiped out his only-humor Abi Gezunt when he had something serious to tell his readers. Going beyond his "Who invented the telephone" (including how many decades it took for the US and UK Patent offices to decide), he tackled topics such as

- Hiram Bingham IV - Unsung Hero, Righteous Gentile during the Holocaust

== Biography ==
After his military service during World War II, he did news photography for small NYC newspapers and went to college at night. His photography freelancing brought him to The Brooklyn Daily and then The Brooklyn Weekly where he met Shalom Klass, who later founded The Jewish Press.

Following his baccalaureate and a master's degree in education, he became a Special Ed teacher for the NYC school system, working with brain-injured children.

He had Parkinson's disease.

His wife died in 2006.

== I Remember When ==
Atop I Remember When is a unique feature: the letters (and the "!" that follows) are designed to resemble Hebrew letters. For example, the "I" is a "Final Nun." The "R" is a "Koof" with an extra foot.

The series, described as "chronicling Jewish life in New York City in the 1930s and 1940s," was introduced in the mid-1960s, and was said to be "timeless" and transmitting "warmth and nostalgia.” The Jewish Press said they'll reprint Fine's writings.

An assemblage of some columns was published in 1992.
