= Emanuel Quint =

Rabbi

Emanuel Quint (Hebrew: עמנואל קווינט; 1930 – 2018) was a rabbi, lawyer and author of the 10-volume A Restatement of Rabbinic Civil Law, parts of which have been serialized in The Jewish Press.

He was the dean and Rosh Kollel of the Jerusalem Institute of Jewish Law, which he co-founded with Rabbi Adin Steinsaltz.

According to his publisher, Rabbi Quint "dedicated his life to training and inspiring those of all ages who lack the language skills, scholarly background, and general training to study the sources of their Jewish tradition."

He was chairman of the Board of Education and later president of the Yeshiva of Flatbush in his native New York, as well as one of the founders of Touro College.

In 1984 he retired from the law office of Quint, Mark and Chill, which he had co-founded in 1955, and moved with his wife, Rena Quint, a child Holocaust survivor, to live and teach in Jerusalem.
