= Lubavitch Youth Organization =

Jewish charity organization

- צעירי אגודת חב"ד
- Formation: 1955
- Founder: Menachem Mendel Schneerson
- Founded at: Crown Heights, Brooklyn, United States
- Chairman: Rabbi Dovid Raskin
- Director: Rabbi Shmuel Butman
- Publication: L'Chaim
- Parent organization: Agudas Chasidei Chabad
- Subsidiaries: Levi Yitzchok Library, Lubavitch Youth Mitzvah Tank, LYO Chabad House, Yad L'Shliach, Pegisha
- Website: https://www.lubavitchyouth.org/

Lubavitch Youth Organization (LYO) is an organization run by Chabad, a Jewish, Hasidic movement. The organization offers a range of services for Jews of all affiliations. LYO was established by the 7th Chabad Rebbe, Rabbi Menachem Mendel Schneerson in 1955. The organization is responsible for the Shluchim, Chabad houses, and ten operations across the state of New York.

Every Friday, the LYO deploys teams of young Chabad Bochurs (young men) to do tefillin campaigns and distribute Shabbat candles to Jews passing by on the street.

Since 1976 it has operated a lending library of Torah books called The Levi Yitzchok Library located on Kingston Street in the Crown Heights neighborhood. The onamed after Rabbi Levi Yitzhak Schneerson.

Since 1978 , it has published a weekly newsletter called L'chaim distributed on Fridays.

Around the holidays, it publishes informational pamphlets about the Jewish holidays in English. During Sukkot, it sets up portable Sukkots.

The organization's chairman, Rabbi Dovid Raskin, died in 2011, after which the organization was led by Rabbi Shmuel Butman until his death in 2024.

For several years (until 1968 ), there was a guest house organization for guests who came to stay at 770 Eastern Parkway with the Rebbe, managed by the Chabad Youth Association in New York.

== Services ==
Services provided by the organization include reciting Kaddish for the Jewish deceased and a community library.

== World's Largest Menorah ==
The Lubavitch Youth Organization organizes the annual lighting of the World's Largest Menorah at Grand Army Plaza near Central Park in Manhattan, New York City. First established in 1977, this public Hanukkah event features a 32-foot menorah designed by Israeli artist Yaacov Agam, built to the maximum height permitted by Jewish law (Halacha). The nightly ceremonies, led for decades by Rabbi Shmuel M. Butman, include traditional Hanukkah foods, live music, and participation from public officials and thousands of attendees.
