= Dovid Raskin =

Rabbi Dovid Raskin
- Born: April 14, 1927; Babruysk, Byelorussian SSR, Soviet Union
- Died: May 10, 2011 (aged 84); New York City, New York, U.S.
- Occupation: Chairman of Lubavitch Youth Organization

Dovid Raskin (1927–2011) was a rabbi associated with the Chabad-Lubavitch Hasidic movement. He served as chairman of the Lubavitch Youth Organization for over 50 years. He also served on the boards of a number of Chabad's central organizations.

== Early life ==
Rabbi Raskin was born in Babruysk, Byelorussian SSR, Soviet Union (now Belarus) in 1927. His father was arrested when Dovid was twelve due to his activities in strengthening Jewish life under Soviet repression.

During World War II, Rabbi Raskin and his family narrowly escaped German-occupied Leningrad. They received last-minute train tickets, escaping just before the last bridge was destroyed by the Nazis. Their journey led them through Omsk and Novosibirsk before settling in Alma-Ata.

His father, Reb Yaakov Yosef, assisted in securing housing and medical care for the Rebbe's parents, Rabbi Levi Yitzchak and Chana Schneerson, during their exile in Alma-Ata. Rabbi Dovid personally cared for the Rebbe's father, even helping him put on Tefillin when he was too weak.

In the winter of 5710 (1950), Rabbi Raskin was part of a group of five Chabad students sent to New York to study under the sixth Lubavitcher Rebbe, Rabbi Yosef Yitzchak Schneersohn.

== Career ==
In 1955, Rabbi Menachem Mendel Schneerson appointed Raskin as to the board of directors for the newly founded Lubavitch Youth Organization. Raskin was later appointed as chairman, a position he held until his death on May 10, 2011.

In 1961, he became the spiritual director of the central Tomchei Temimim Yeshiva at 770 Eastern Parkway, a role he held until his death.

Raskin was also a faculty member of the United Lubavitcher Yeshivoth and was appointed to the boards of Chabad-Lubavitch's central organization including Agudas Chasidei Chabad, Merkos L’Inyonei Chinuch, Mahane Israel (Chabad), as well as Beth Rivkah girls school.

== Relationship with Lubavitcher Rebbe ==
Rabbi Raskin was the Rebbe's regular baal korei (Torah reader) during weekday services and had the responsibility of preparing the Daled Minim for the Rebbe and his wife.

== Torah dedication ==
In 2018 a Sefer Torah was dedicated in Raskin's memory.
