= Gershon Tannenbaum =

Gershon Tannenbaum (1949 – 2016) was the director of the Rabbinical Alliance of America (Iggud HaRabbonim) and a longtime Jewish Press columnist (Machberes).

His Machberes column, sometimes spanning more than one page, was subtitled "News and Views of the Yeshivish and Chasidishe World." Tannenbaum, in noting a Yartzeit, would sometimes recount the individual's life story.

He was also the rabbi of the 1924-founded B’nai Israel of Linden Heights synagogue, in Boro Park.

Tannenbaum was involved in helping victims of abuse, and his concern was reflected in his writings.

== My Machberes ==
Tannenbaum was known for his full page detailed writings in a long-running Jewish Press featured column. When the rabbi named by an Australian newspaper's "World's oldest rabbi visits Oz" headline died a year later at age 106, the two line caption on the front-page photo of the funeral ended "see My Machberes."

== Biography ==
Tannenbaum was born 1949 in a DP camp located in Windsheim, Germany. He continued the family history of service as a rabbi.

His rabbinical studies were both in Israel and the USA.

He is survived by his wife, their two sons who are rabbis, and two (married) daughters.
