= World's Largest Menorah =

Public menorah in Manhattan, New York

Lighting of the World's Largest Menorah
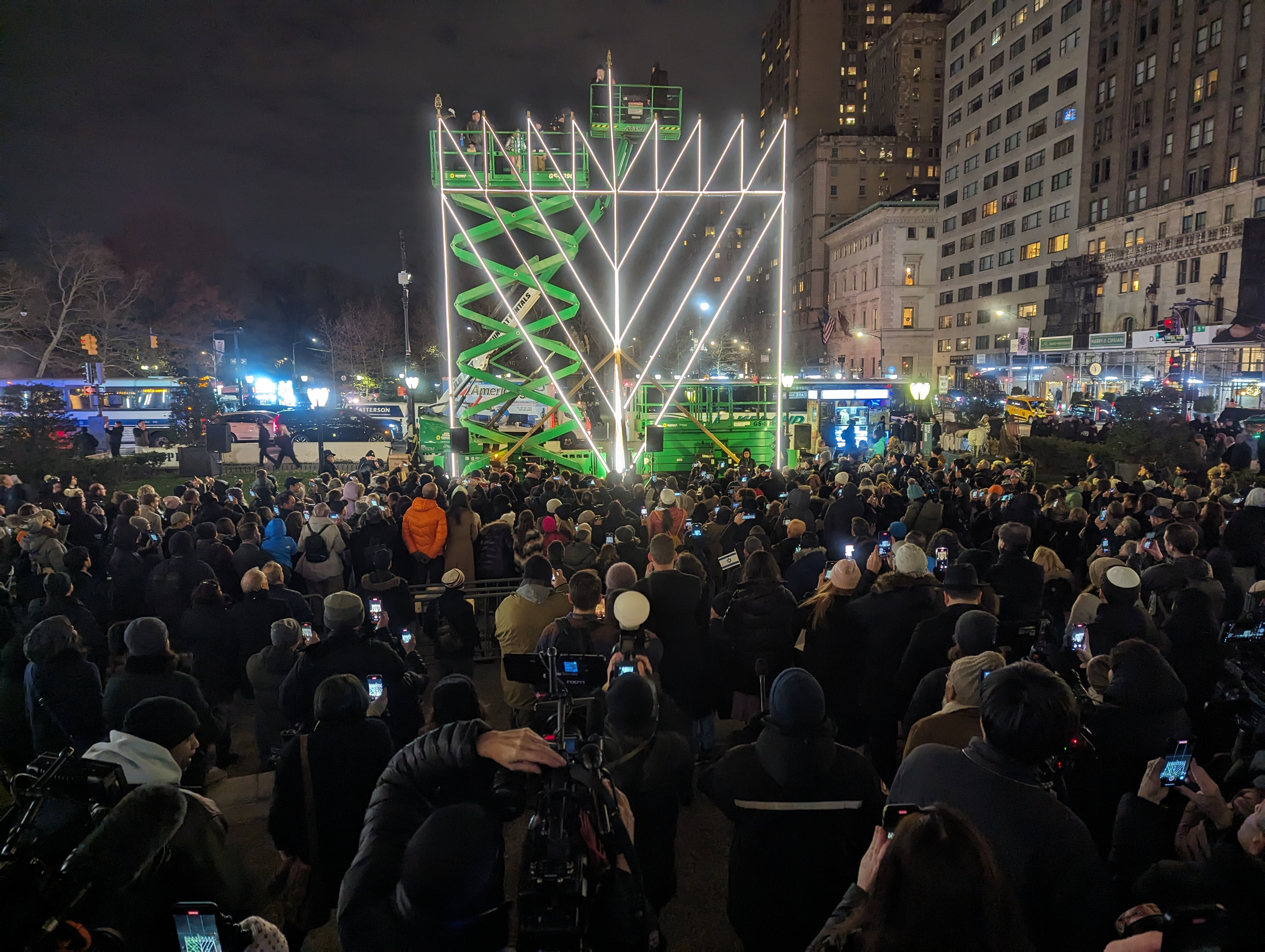
- Lighting ceremony in 2023
- Frequency: Annual
- Locations: Grand Army Plaza, Manhattan
- Years active: 1977–present
- Patron: Lubavitch Youth Organization

The World's Largest Menorah is a public Hanukkah menorah located at Grand Army Plaza near Central Park in Manhattan, New York City. Standing 32 feet (9.75 meters) tall and weighing approximately 4,000 pounds (1,814 kilograms), it has been a prominent fixture in New York City's annual Hanukkah celebrations since its first lighting in 1977.

== History ==
The public lighting of Hanukkah menorahs began in the 1970s, encouraged by the Lubavitcher Rebbe, Rabbi Menachem Mendel Schneerson, who advocated for public displays of Jewish observance. In 1977, the Lubavitch Youth Organization erected the first public menorah in New York City at Grand Army Plaza, near Central Park. The inaugural lighting was attended by Senator Jacob K. Javits and Rabbi Shmuel Butman, director of the Lubavitch Youth Organization, who were lifted by a Con Edison cherry picker to light the menorah. Thousands attended the event, marking New York City's first public Hanukkah menorah lighting.

In the mid-1980s, Atara Ciechanover proposed redesigning the menorah to create a more visually impactful structure. She collaborated with Israeli artist Yaacov Agam, who designed the current menorah with a structure inspired by the Rambam's depiction of the menorah in the Holy Temple. The new design was first lit on December 26, 1986. In 2006, the menorah was officially recognized by the Guinness Book of World Records as the largest menorah in the world.

== Design ==
The menorah stands at 32 feet, the maximum height permitted by halakha for a kosher menorah. According to Jewish law, a menorah taller than this would not fulfill the mitzvah of publicizing the Hanukkah miracle because it would be too high to be seen and acknowledged by passersby.

The menorah is constructed from steel with a gold-colored finish. It features nine oil lamps—eight representing the nights of Hanukkah and a central shamash (helper light). Specially designed glass chimneys protect the flames from wind. Due to its height, Con Edison provides a crane to lift individuals for the lighting each night. In 2020, LED lights were added alongside the menorah's frame to honor New York City victims of the coronavirus pandemic.

== Lighting ceremonies ==
The lighting ceremonies are held nightly throughout Hanukkah. These events are free and open to the public and include live music, traditional Hanukkah foods, and activities for attendees. Notable public officials, including Mayors Michael Bloomberg and Eric Adams, Governor Kathy Hochul, Senator Chuck Schumer, Assembly Speaker Sheldon Silver and Attorney General Robert Abrams, have participated in past ceremonies.

Due to the requirement in Jewish law that menorahs and Shabbat candles must be lit before sunset, Rabbi Shmuel Butman historically used a police escort and a private helicopter to return home to Crown Heights, Brooklyn, after lighting the menorah in Manhattan on Fridays. This arrangement has been in place since the inaugural lighting in 1977, though the police escort ended in 1991.

== See also ==
- National Menorah
