= J. Simcha Cohen =

Jack Simcha Cohen (1936–2014) was an "18th consecutive communal rabbi in his family" and "the face of Orthodox Judaism" to a TV program "viewed by millions each week." He held positions in New York, New Jersey, California (18 years) and Australia, with his "final position in the rabbinate" in Florida.

Cohen, who died on his 78th birthday, was also a long time columnist in The Jewish Press and the author of several books. His first involvement in Jewish public life had been with National Council of Synagogue Youth (NCSY).

== Education ==
He attended public school during his early elementary years while studying with his father, rabbi of an Orthodox synagogue in Asbury Park, New Jersey. His formal education continued at Yeshiva Chaim Berlin from which he received rabbinical ordination.

His use of "J. Simcha" and "Jack Simcha" can be traced to marrying Shoshana Nayman during his postgraduate studies, and his father-in-law's first name Yaakov, being the same as his.

== Metropolitan New York Coordinating Council on Jewish Poverty ==
Cohen was their first executive director. Although known by shorter names, the full name was "Metropolitan New York Coordinating Council on Jewish Poverty."

== New Jersey ==
His first pulpit position was "at Congregation Ahawas Achim B'nai Jacob and David" in West Orange, New Jersey.

== California ==
He was described by the Los Angeles Times as "Orthodox Rabbi Jack Simcha Cohen, 50, spiritual leader of Congregation Shaarei Tefila in Los Angeles" when he became president of the Board of Rabbis of Southern California. The newspaper described the board as a "240-member body dominated by rabbis from the Reform and Conservative branches." Cohen served the synagogue for 18 years.

== Australia ==
His involvement in the Jewish community of Melbourne, Australia included synagogue rabbi and kashrus supervision.

He arrived there in 1996; shortly after he died, an Australian rabbi/educator wrote about his "pleasant disposition .. a professional American style Rabbi with lots of grandeur."

== Florida (final position in the rabbinate) ==
After leaving Australia Cohen became the rabbi of Congregation Aitz Chaim, in West Palm Beach. As of that time, he had authored six books.

While in Florida he continued writing his Jewish Press column, but also began contributing to a 2007-founded Torah weblog, Jewish Ideas.

== Jewish Press column ==
His Halachic Questions column originated when a future associate editor of The Jewish Press, while vacationing in Los Angeles, met and encouraged Cohen to talk with the New York-based paper's co-founder Sholom Klass. The latter two met when Cohen was visiting New York. He began "to write a weekly halacha column" for which "the final installment .. appeared in the paper .. days before his death."

Some topics were tip-of-the-iceberg.

=== Appointing Women Leaders ===
An example of a topic he wrote about in 1999, which has become of practical application for Modern Orthodox synagogues by 2017, is the matter of synagogues with a woman president. He cited two earlier writings from prior generations with:

- "perhaps the requirement .. to be a male" is negated if she is more qualified than male alternative candidates.
- since it is compared to being a king, and Jewish kings were intended to rule in the Land of Israel, then outside Israel might be OK.

He conceded that both of these were "not reported as halachic rulings" and are just theoretical.

=== Family, privacy, charity ===
His Obligations of a Charity Collector backed with 3 citations that a communal charity official not only may but must reveal to family members that their relative needs financial assistance, even overriding "whether the claimant for funds gives such permission."

== Books ==
Cohen, who was described as "a Talmud scholar and prolific author" authored:

- Intermarriage and Conversion: A Halakhic Solution
- The 613th Commandment: An Analysis of the Mitzvah to Write a Sefer Torah
- How Does Jewish Law Work?
- Shabbat: The Right Way: Resolving Halachic Dilemmas
- Timely Jewish Questions, Timeless Rabbinic Answers
- The Jewish Heart: Essays on Jewish Sensitivities
- Jewish Prayer: The Right Way
