= Igud HaRabbonim =

American right-wing rabbinical organization

Igud HaRabonim (Rabbinical Alliance of America) is a right-wing national rabbinical organization, with over 800 members across North America. Founded in 1942, it has for years received publicity from Rabbi Sholom Klass and The Jewish Press.

The organization has an active beth din (rabbinical court) in the greater New York City metropolitan area. Just as in any other binding arbitration, its decisions are binding in civil courts if the litigants agree to appoint the beth din to arbitrate their dispute.

== Officers ==
The organization's first president and co-founder was Rabbi Dr. Samuel Turk. Rabbi Gershon Tannenbaum served as director. Rabbi Abraham Hecht was president until his death in 2013.

Officers as of November 2023 include:

- Rabbi Yehoshua S. Hecht, Rabbi Yaakov Klass and Rabbi Hanania Elbaz - Presidium

Rabbi Mendy Mirocznik- EVP Rabbi Moish Schmerler - Director
