= Fire and Water Fountain =

Kinetic sculpture and fountain in Tel Aviv, Israel

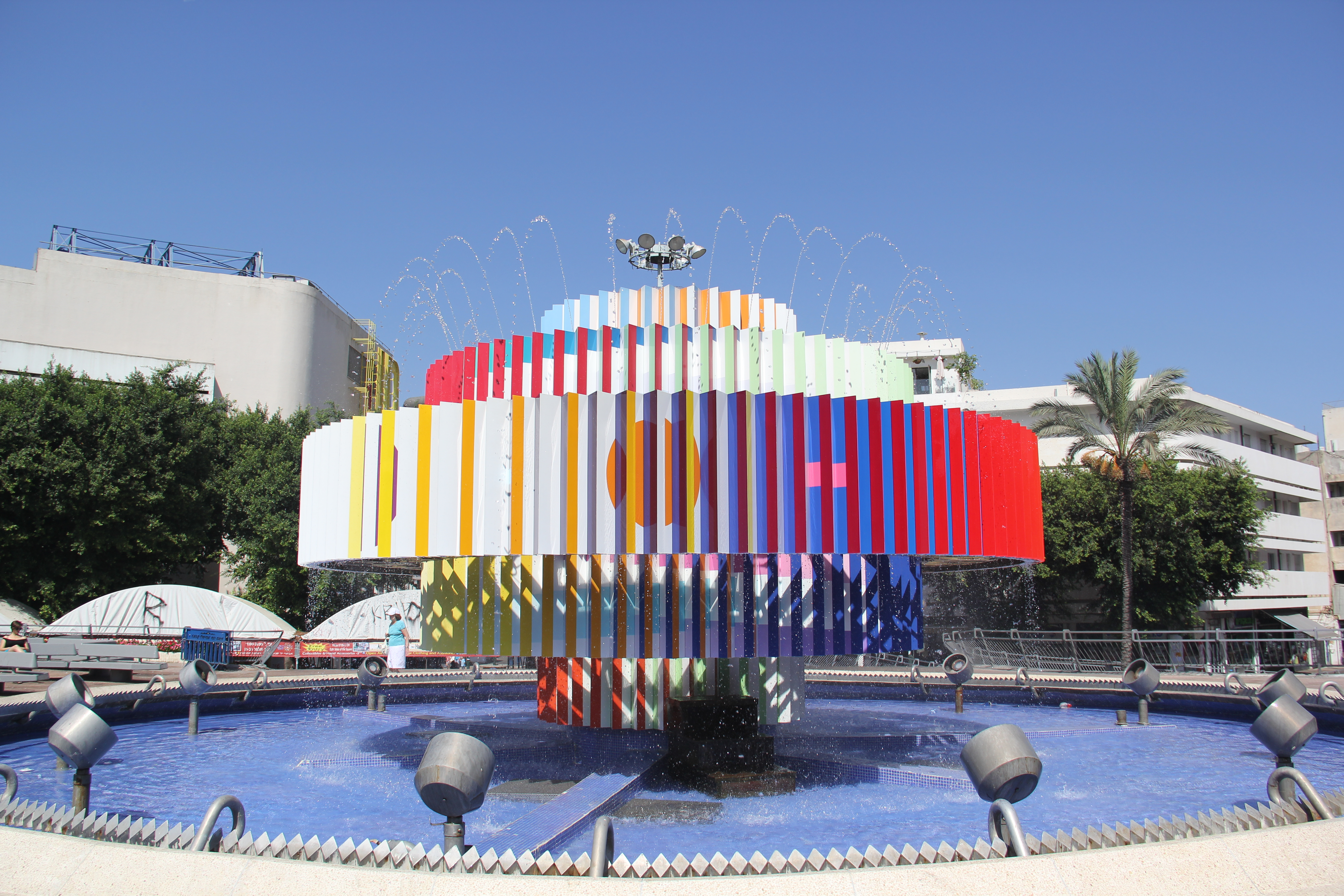
- The fountain in 2012
- Artist: Yaacov Agam
- Year: 15 July 1986
- Type: Fountain; kinetic art; op art
- Location: Tel Aviv; 32.077965°N 34.774184°E

Fire and Water (Hebrew: אש ומים), is a Tel Aviv art installation also referred to as the Dizengoff Square Fountain, is a landmark in the center of Dizengoff Square, Tel Aviv. Dedicated in 1986, the fountain is a kinetic sculpture by Israeli artist Yaacov Agam. The artwork was removed in 2016 when the fountain was temporarily relocated as the square hosting the fountain was being rebuilt, and has not been restored ever since.

== Description ==
The fountain was developed by Agam for ten years and is one of Agam's most famous creations. Agam has gained international recognition as one of the founders of the kinetic art movement. The fountain consists of an illusory dimension and a movement dimension, both typical to works of Kinetic art and Op art, which is achieved by the use of technology and by the observer's movement. The fountain is composed of several big jagged wheels, which were designed in the kinetic style (colored geometric shapes, which are perceived as different images from different angles). A technological mechanism is automatically activated at different times of the day and the night, turning the wheels on their hinges, injecting water upwards in various forms, spitting fire upwards and playing music.

Through the years the fountain drew criticism from some Tel Aviv residents for the high cost of its ongoing maintenance.

In 2012, the fountain reopened after a restoration, freshly painted and repaired.

In December 2016, the fountain was relocated to the Reading Parking Lot in north Tel Aviv for the renovation of the plaza. It was replaced on the plaza after the renovations were completed in July 2018. Although the fountain was rebuilt, the colorful artistic details and technological mechanism were missing. Agam was working new artistic detail scheduled to be completed in time for the city's hosting of the 2019 Eurovision song contest. But as of 2025, no new artwork has been installed.

== Gallery ==
=== With the artwork ===
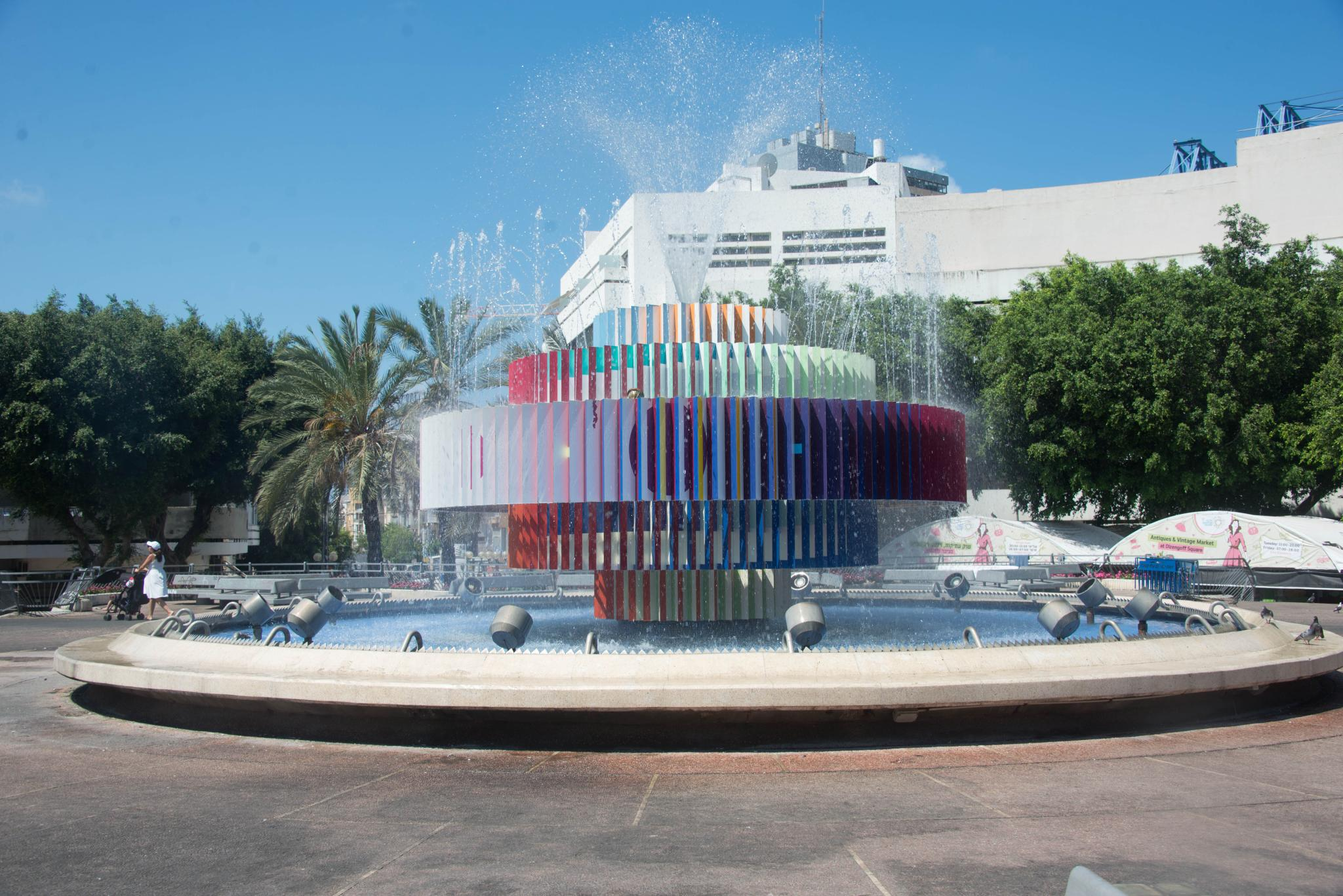
The fountain in 2014

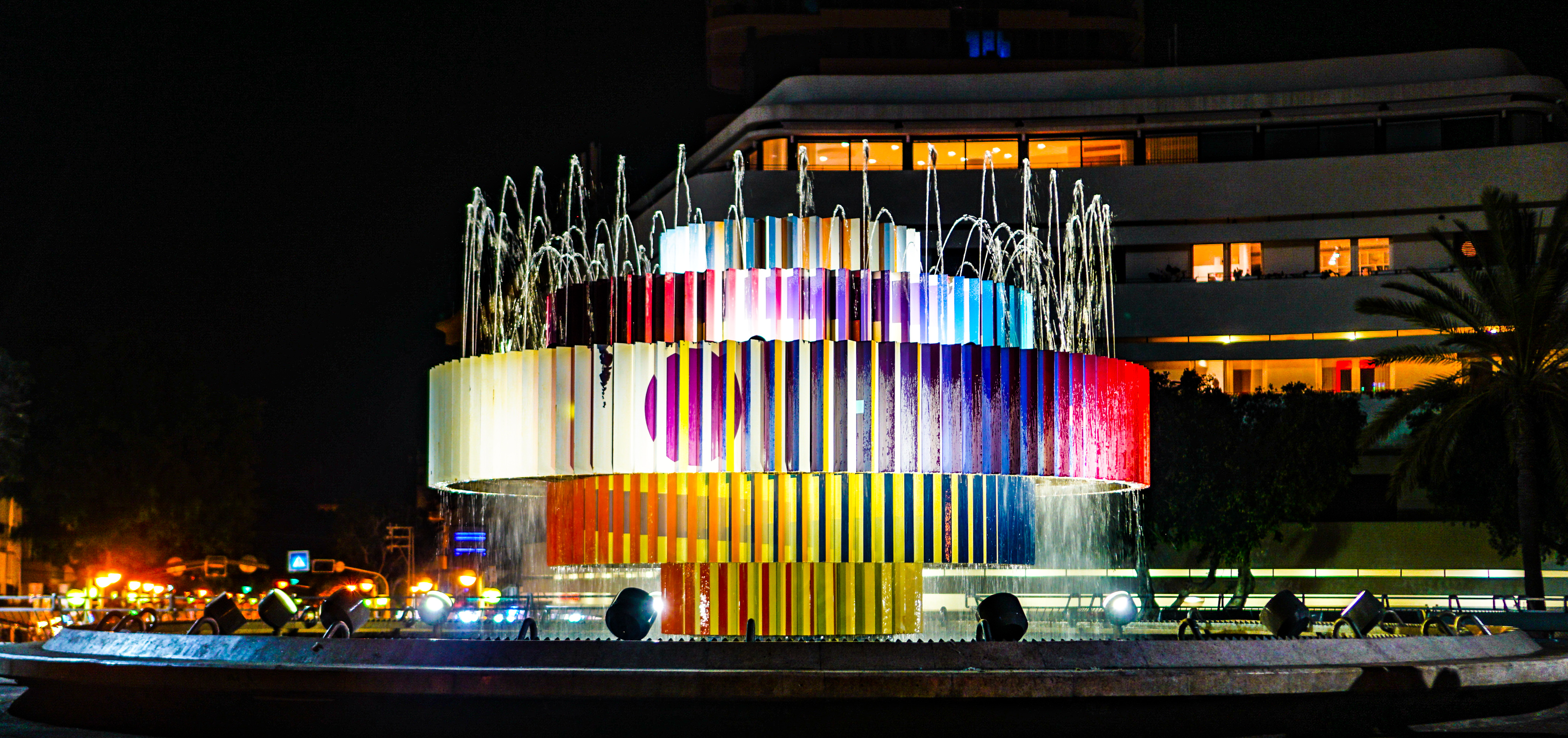
The fountain at night in 2016

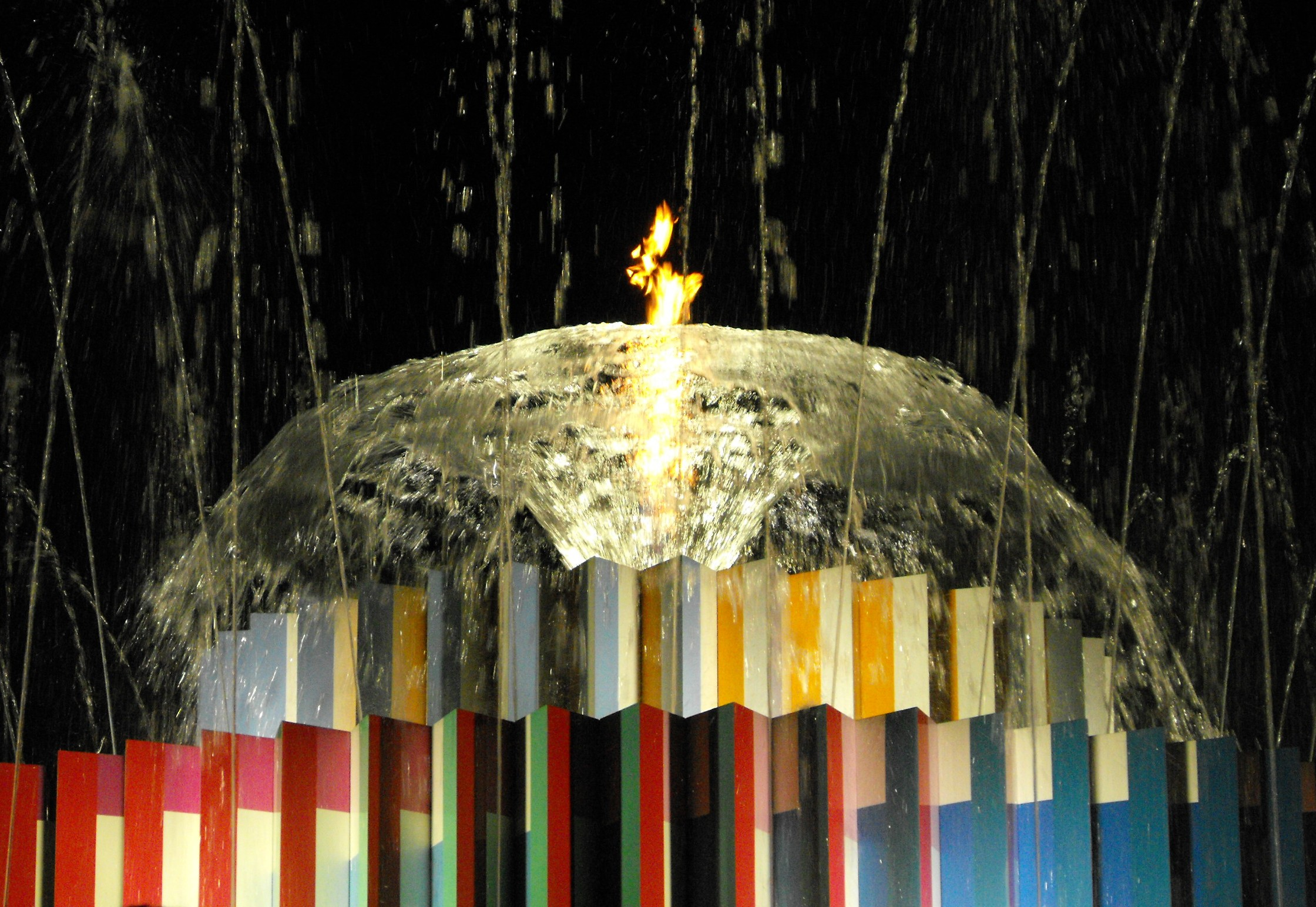
Closeup of the top of the fountain at night in 2013

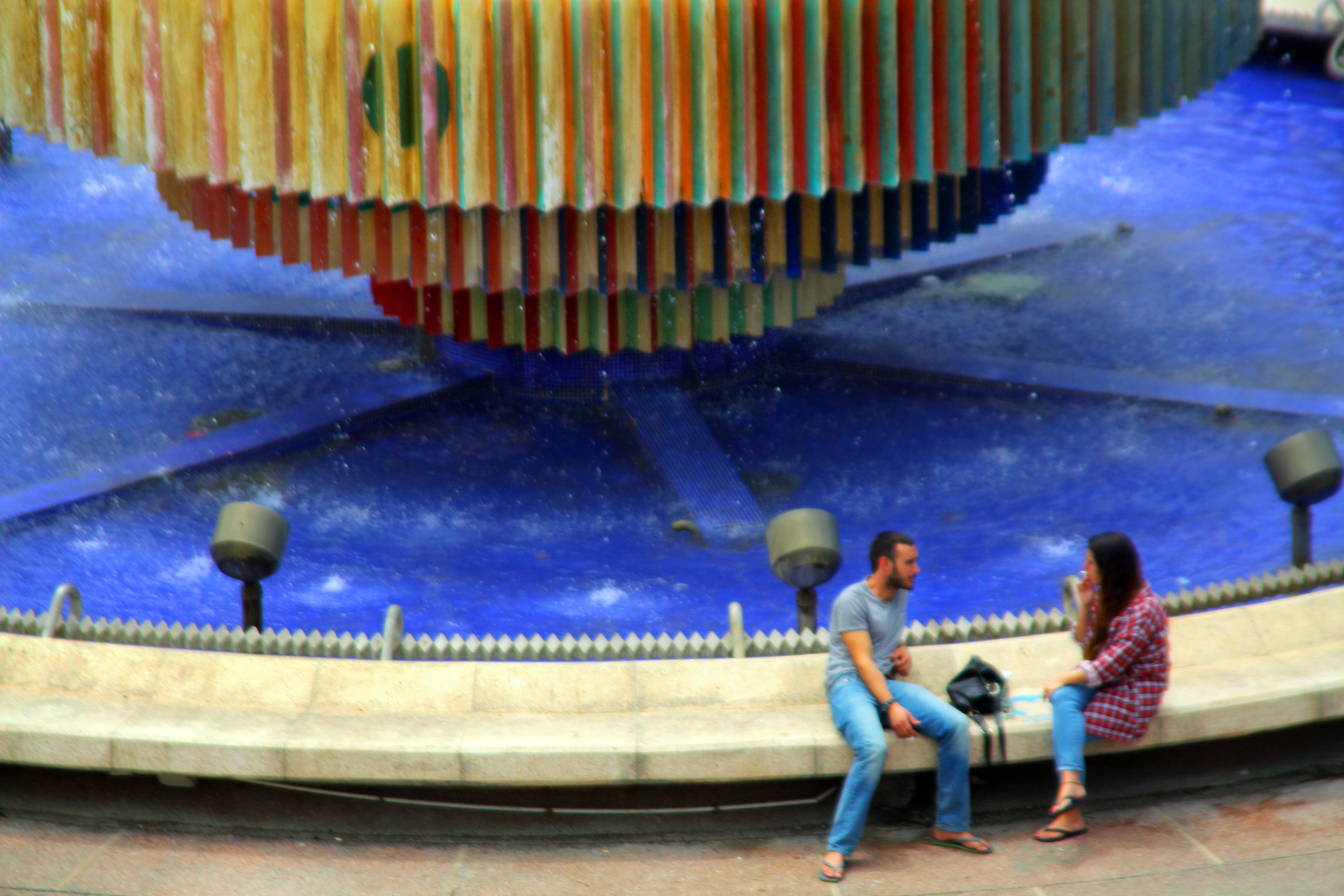
Closeup of the bottom of the fountain in 2011

=== Without the artwork ===
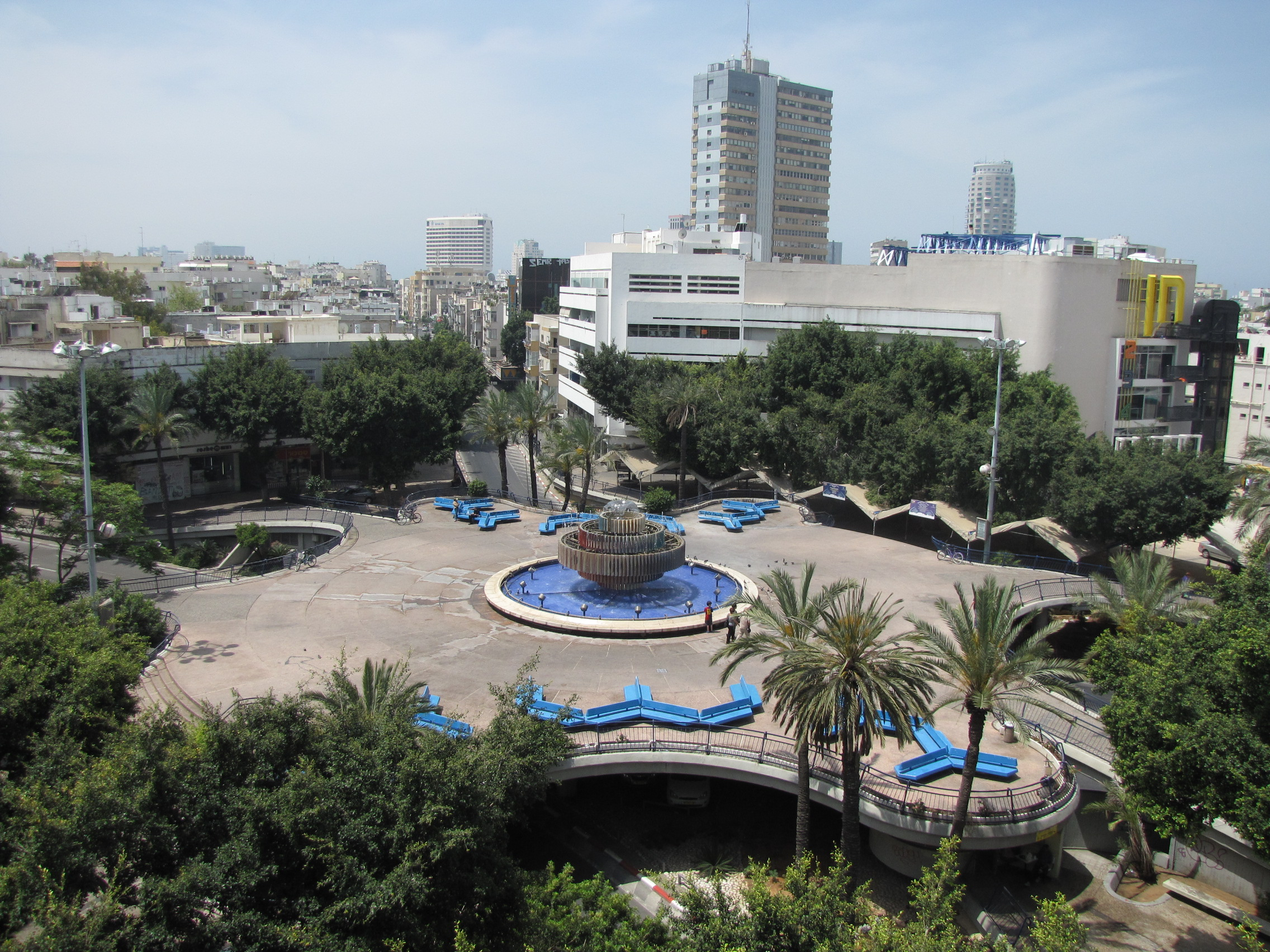
A bird's eye view of the fountain in 2010, when the square featuring the fountain was elevated, and the artwork was removed for restoration

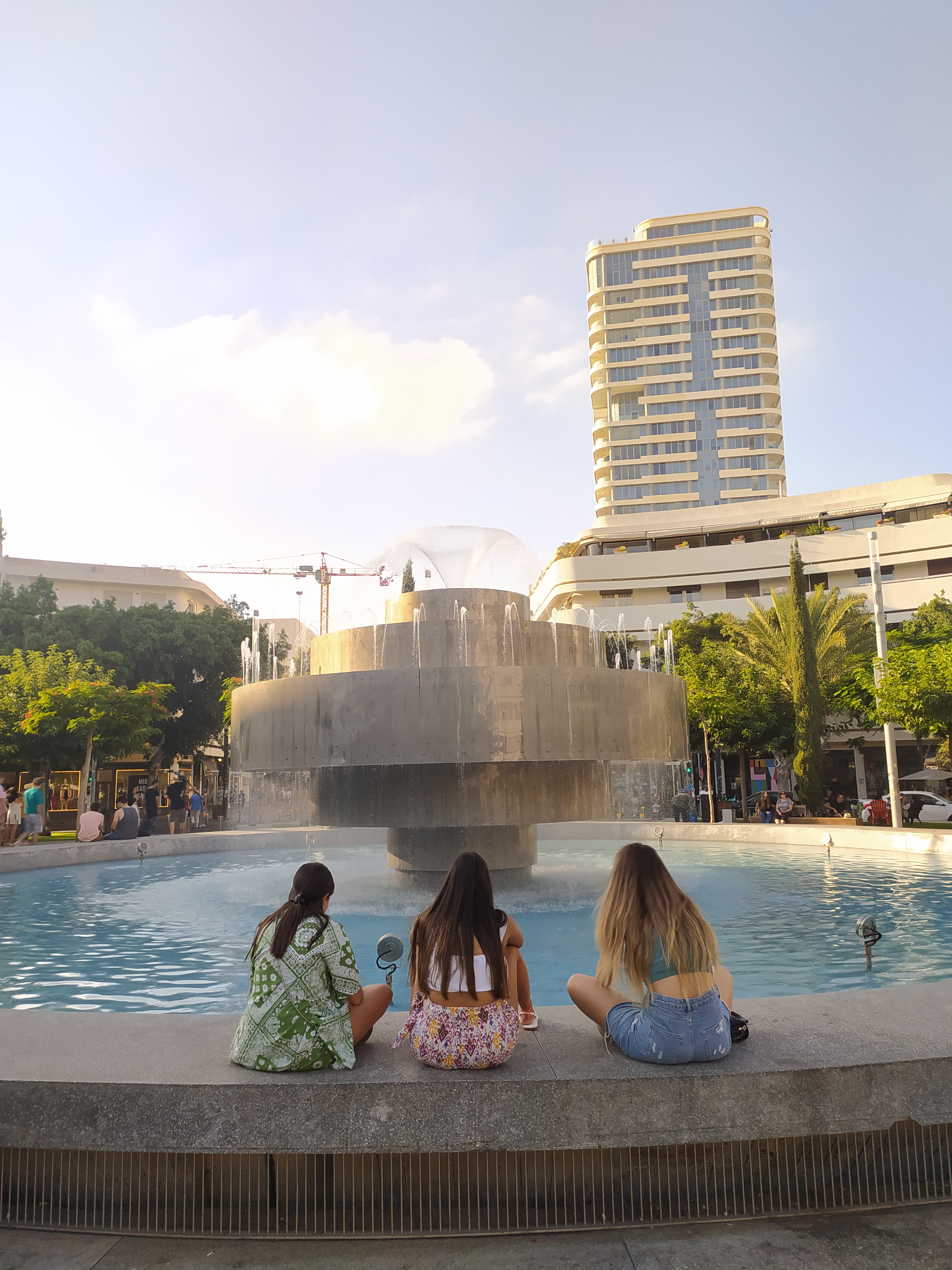
The fountain in 2022. The kinetic artwork was removed permanently in 2016.

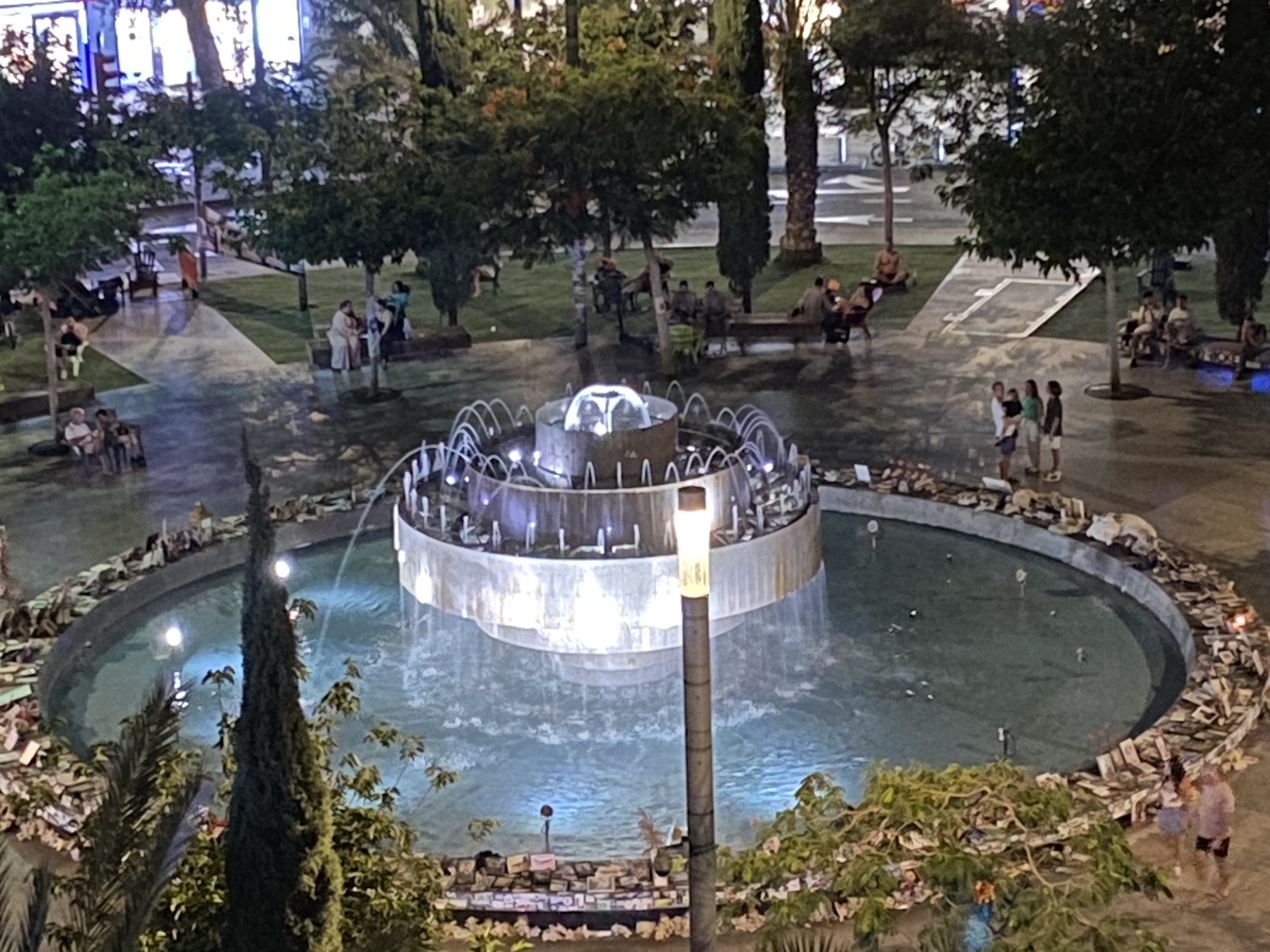
A bird's eye view of the fountain in 2024, after the square was reconstructed to street level

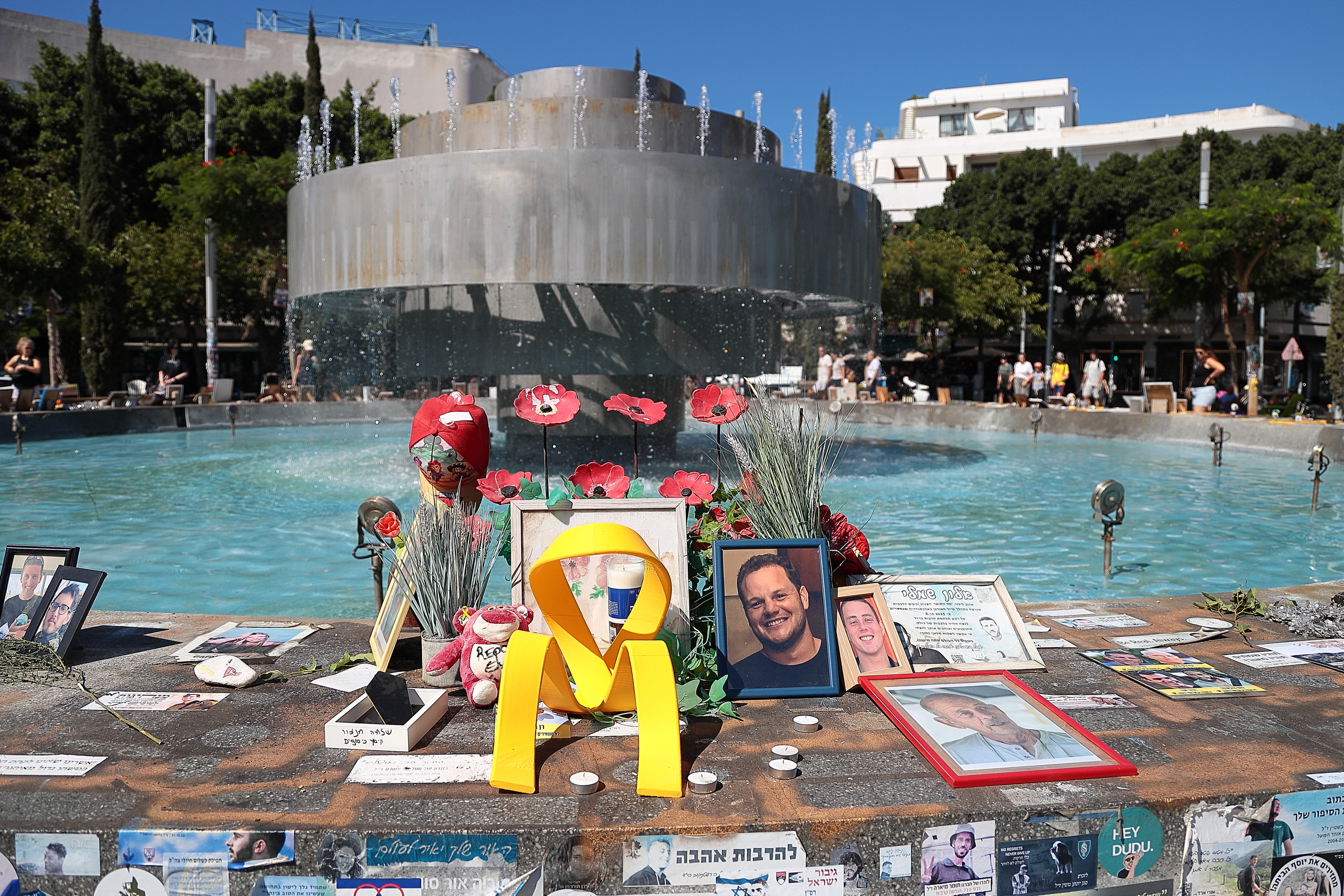
The fountain in 2025 on the second anniversary of the October 7 attacks turned into a makeshift memorial for the hostages held in Gaza

== See also ==
- Art in Tel Aviv
