= Dizengoff Square =

Public square in Tel Aviv, Israel

Zina Dizengoff Square כיכר צינה דיזנגוף
- Public square
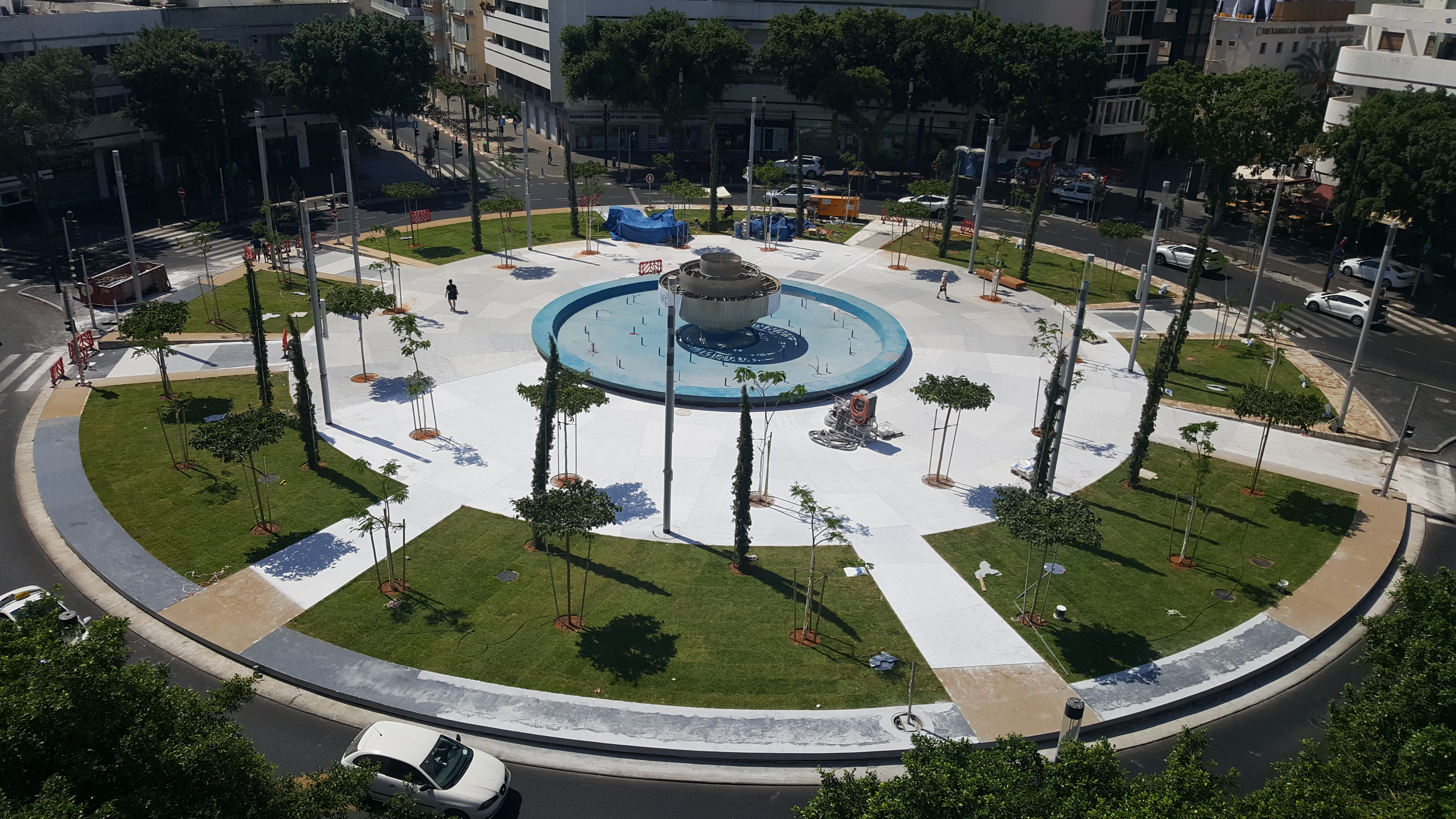
- Dizengoff Square in 2018, after its reconstruction
- Opened: 1938
- Location: Tel Aviv, Israel
- Interactive map of Zina Dizengoff Square
- Coordinates: 32°04′41″N 34°46′27″E

Dizengoff Square or Dizengoff Circus (Hebrew: כִּכָּר דִיזֶנְגוֹף, fully Zina Dizengoff Square, כִּכָּר צִינָה דִיזֶנְגוֹף, Kikar Tsina Dizengof) is a public square in Tel Aviv, on the corner of Dizengoff Street, Reines Street, and Pinsker Street. One of the city's main squares, it was built in 1934 and inaugurated in 1938.

== Name ==
Dizengoff Square is named for Zina (Tzina), the wife of Tel Aviv's first mayor, Meir Dizengoff. Its original 1930s design was called "the Étoile of Tel Aviv" due to the form of the square – a roundabout at the intersection of six streets.

== History ==
=== Early history (1930s–70s) ===
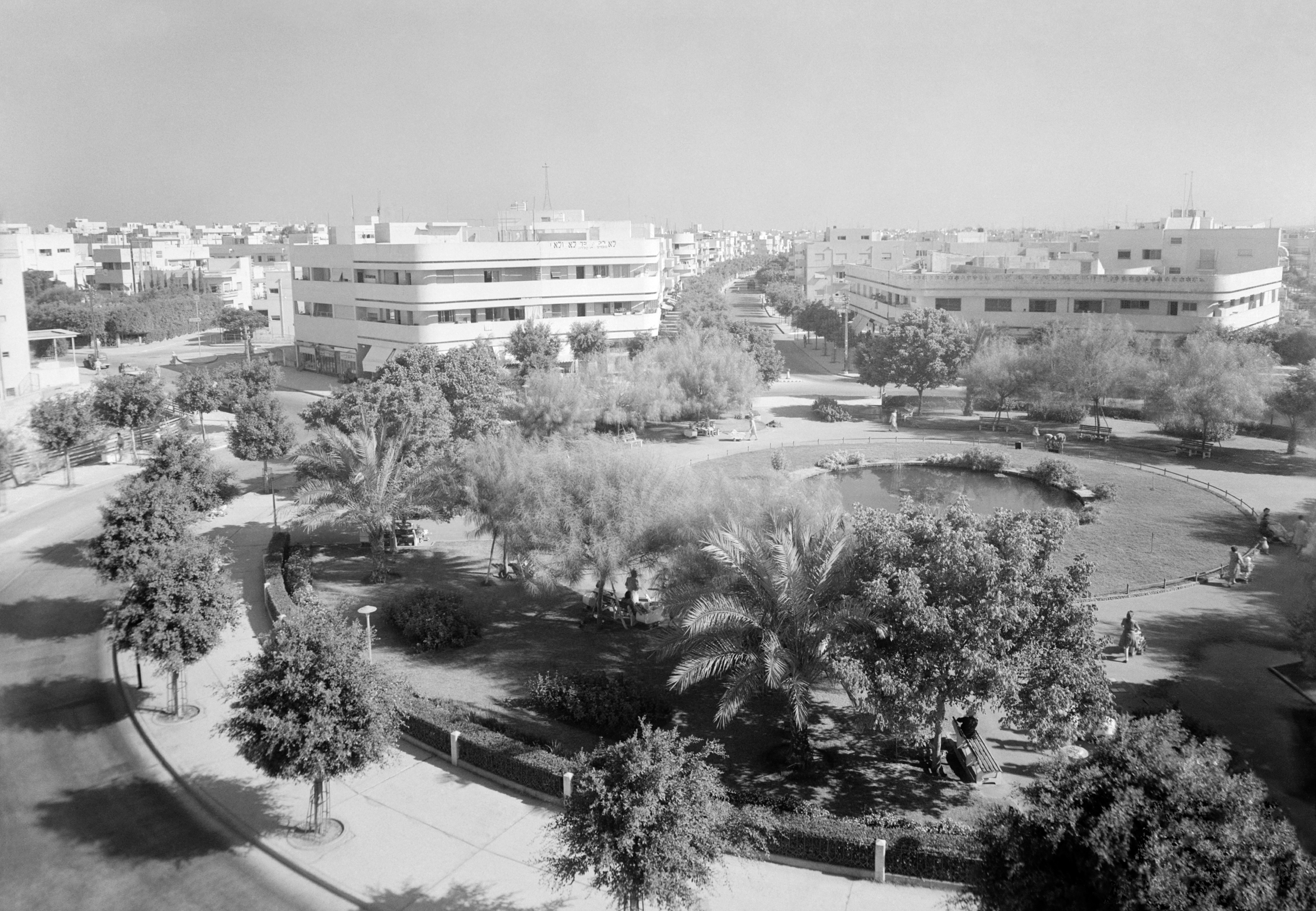
Dizengoff Square, photographed between 1940 and 1946.

In 1934, Genia Averbuch won a competition for the design of a municipal plaza. The square is a circular plaza and has been a focal point of Tel Aviv since its establishment, its location in the very heart of Tel Aviv being one of the reasons.

=== Redesign (1970s) ===
In 1978, a split-level configuration was introduced. The plan was by architect Tsvi Lissar, of Lissar Architects and City Planners. It was elevated in an effort to ease congestion in the area. The square was rebuilt using an entirely different design: the square was covered with an elevated pedestrian plaza above Dizengoff Street, Pinsker Street and Reines Street. The pedestrian area is elevated, connected by ramps to the adjacent sidewalks and to the pedestrian areas of Ben Ami and Zamenhoff streets, while traffic uses the lower level.

=== Center and fountain (1980s) ===
The square stands 300 metres (980 ft) from Dizengoff Center, construction of which began in 1972 and was not completed until 1983. A fountain bearing a Glass Statue made by Allen David was erected in the middle of the square during its redesign in the 1970s, and was replaced in 1986 with Yaacov Agam's now landmark kinetic sculpture fountain. The Fire and Water fountain was located in the center of the elevated, second square and will be reinstalled in the third street-level square once work on its core finishes; an underground infrastructure chamber will be built for the Fountain.

=== Restoration (2010s) ===
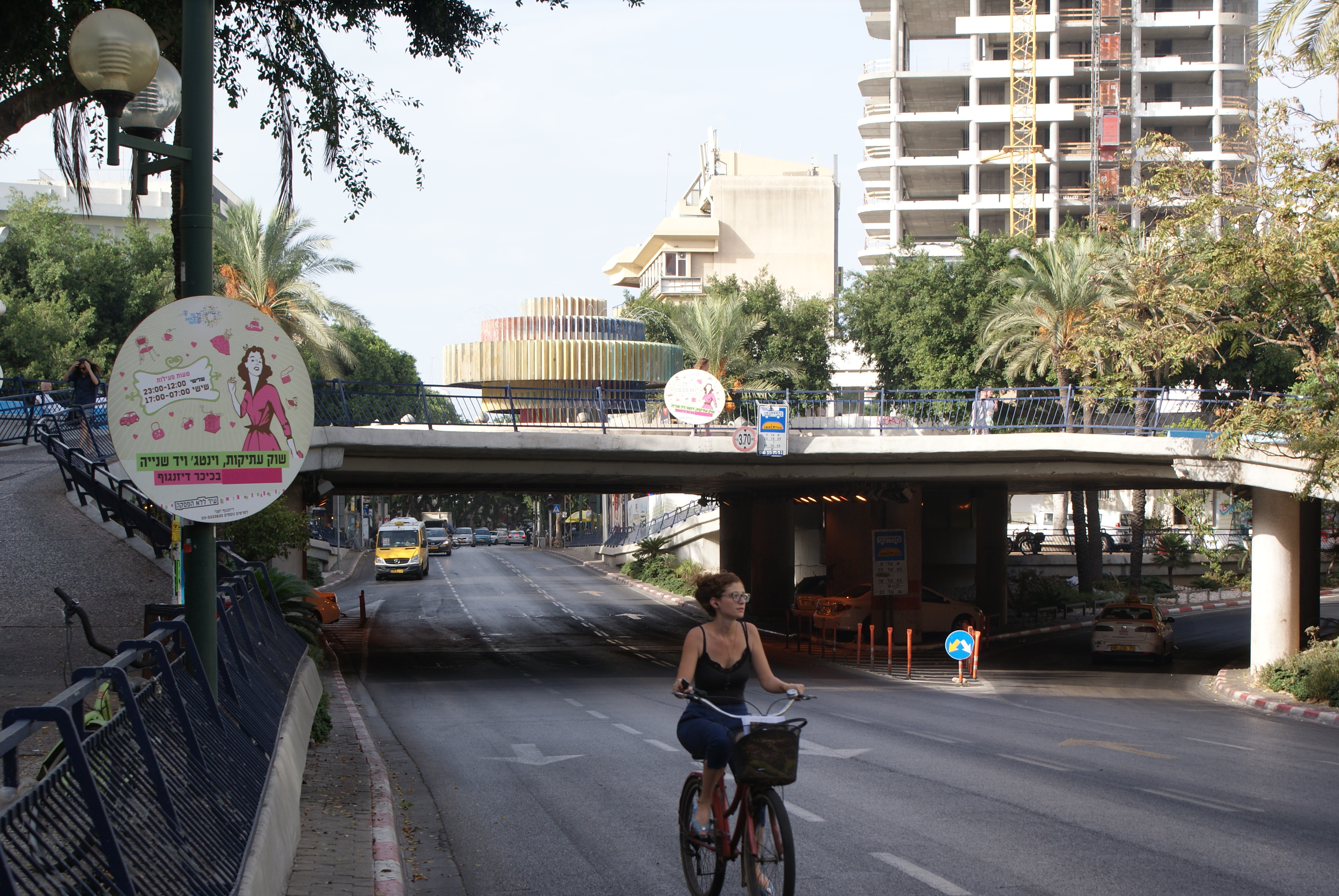
The fountain in 2010

In 2012, the fountain was restored, freshly painted and repaired. In addition, the benches were repainted blue.

=== Redesign (2016–2018) ===
In 2016, the Tel Aviv municipality decided to bring the square back to its original design and move it back to street level, causing public controversy.

The works on demolishing the elevated square began on January 8, 2017, and a ground-level road, similar in layout to the underpass under the heightened square, was opened on January 18. At that point, work began on tiling the sidewalk rim and paving a permanent circular road. The circular road, which maintains the second square's traffic directions, was opened – though in an unfinished state – on October 30, with the interchange-style road being closed, and demolished a day later to allow work on the third square's core to begin.

On June 2, 2018, all roadworks on the Third square's circular road were completed: its remaining closed section, running from Reines St. to Dizengoff St., was opened, and the crosswalks were brought closer to the square's core.

The Fire and Water Fountain, Yaacov Agam's artwork representing kinetic art and op art, was back in 2019 but the monument was stripped of its colorful, artistic details and technological mechanism. It is an example of destruction of the artwork.

== Activity ==
Audio guided tours around the square were offered by Bauhaus Center Tel Aviv. Twice a week, a second-hand market took place at the bottom level; it was subsequently moved to Giv'on Square due to the square's reconstruction.

The beth midrash (synagogue/study hall) of the Koidanover Rebbe, Rabbi Yaakov Tzvi Meir Ehrlich, is located in Dizengoff Square. This beis medrash serves as an outreach center where weekly lectures and a Friday-night Oneg Shabbat attract many secular Jews and guide them towards religious observance. The Koidanover Rebbe is well known as an inspiring speaker and educator.

== In popular culture ==
- Matt Harding chose Dizengoff Square and Agam's fountain to film his worldwide dance, Where the Hell is Matt?, on June 28, 2007 (the film was released in 2008, and is available here).

== Gallery ==
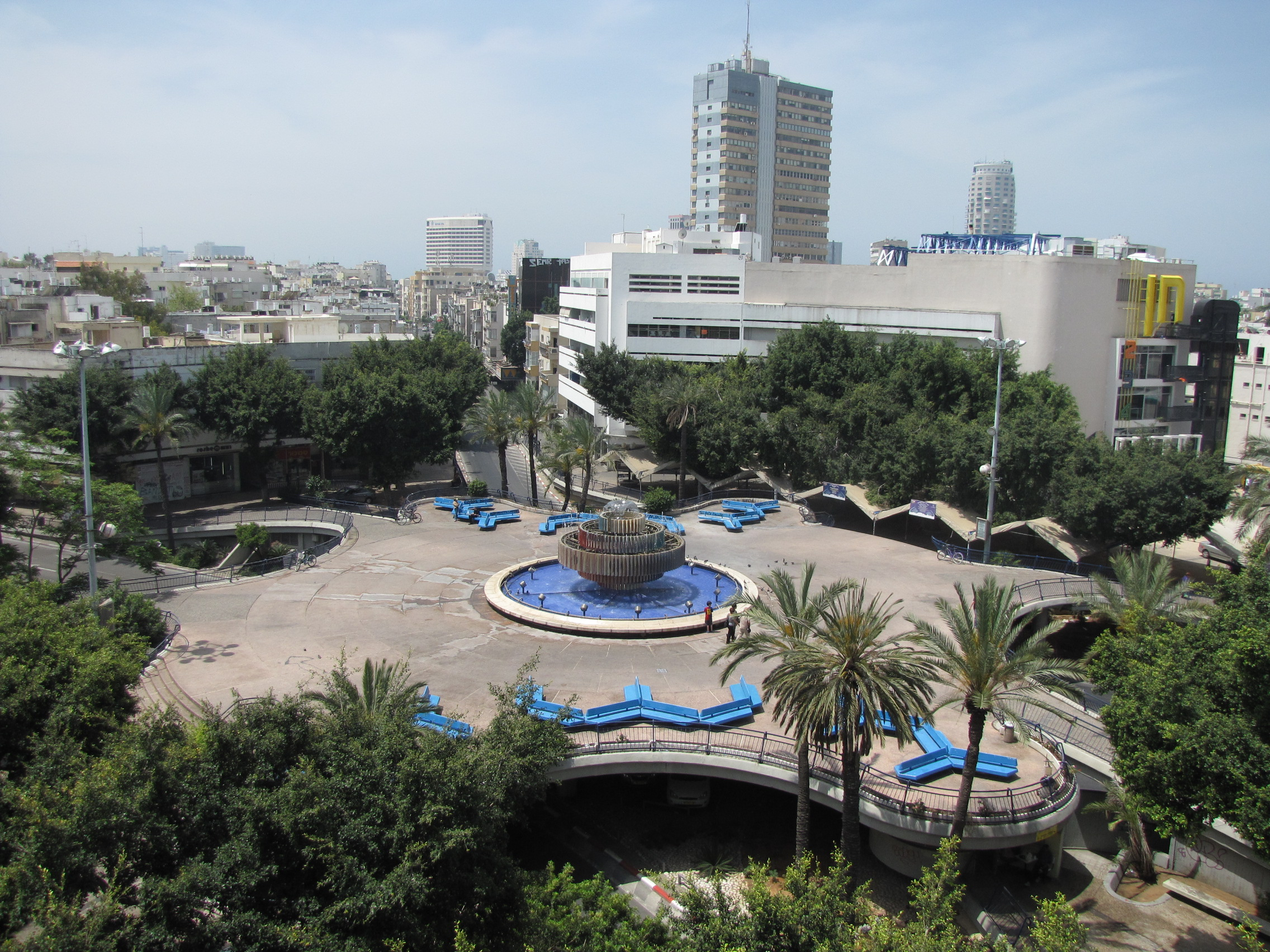
A picture showing the former split-level layout (2010)

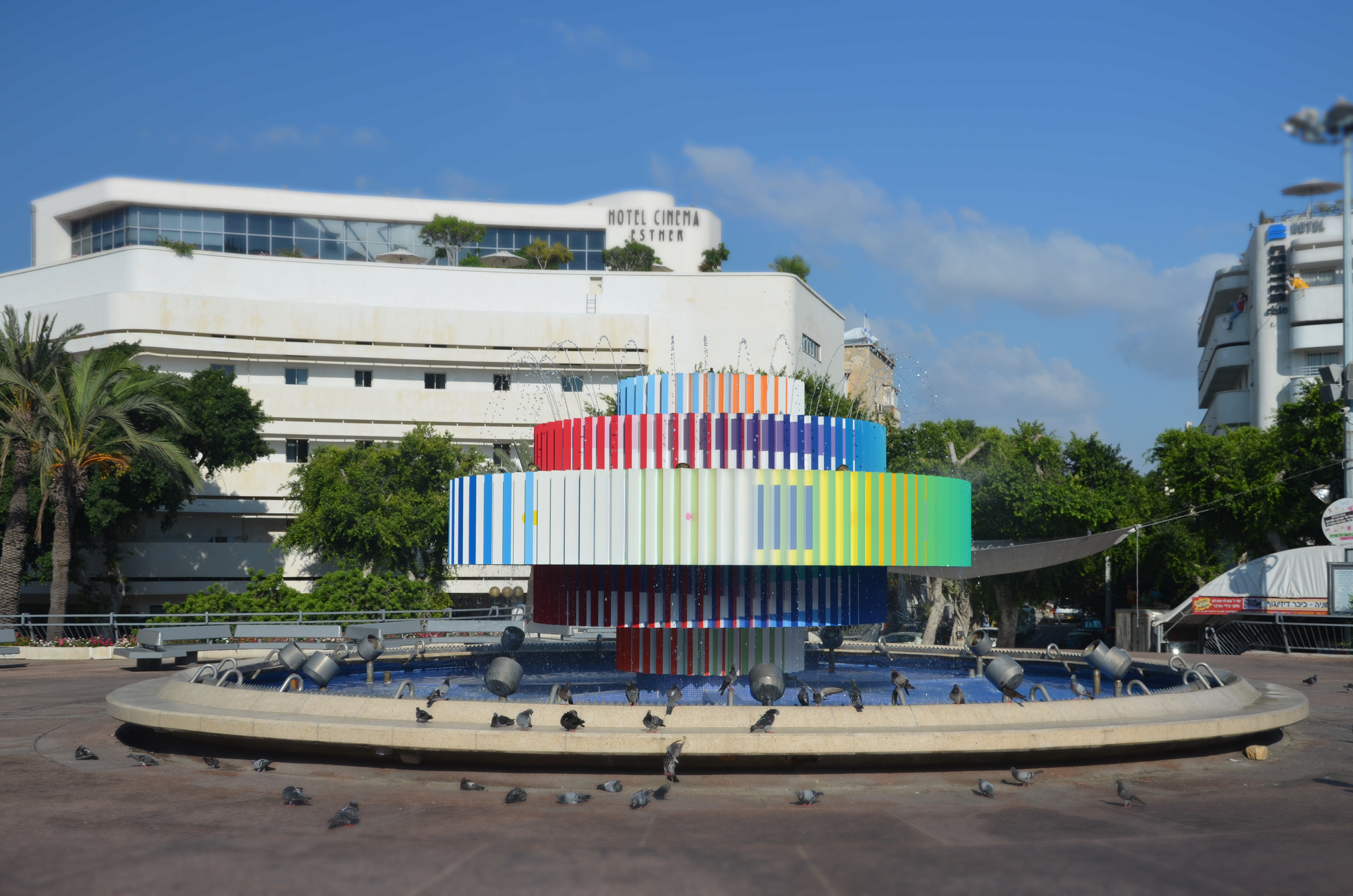
The square's Fire and Water Fountain, behind it the Esther cinema (2012).

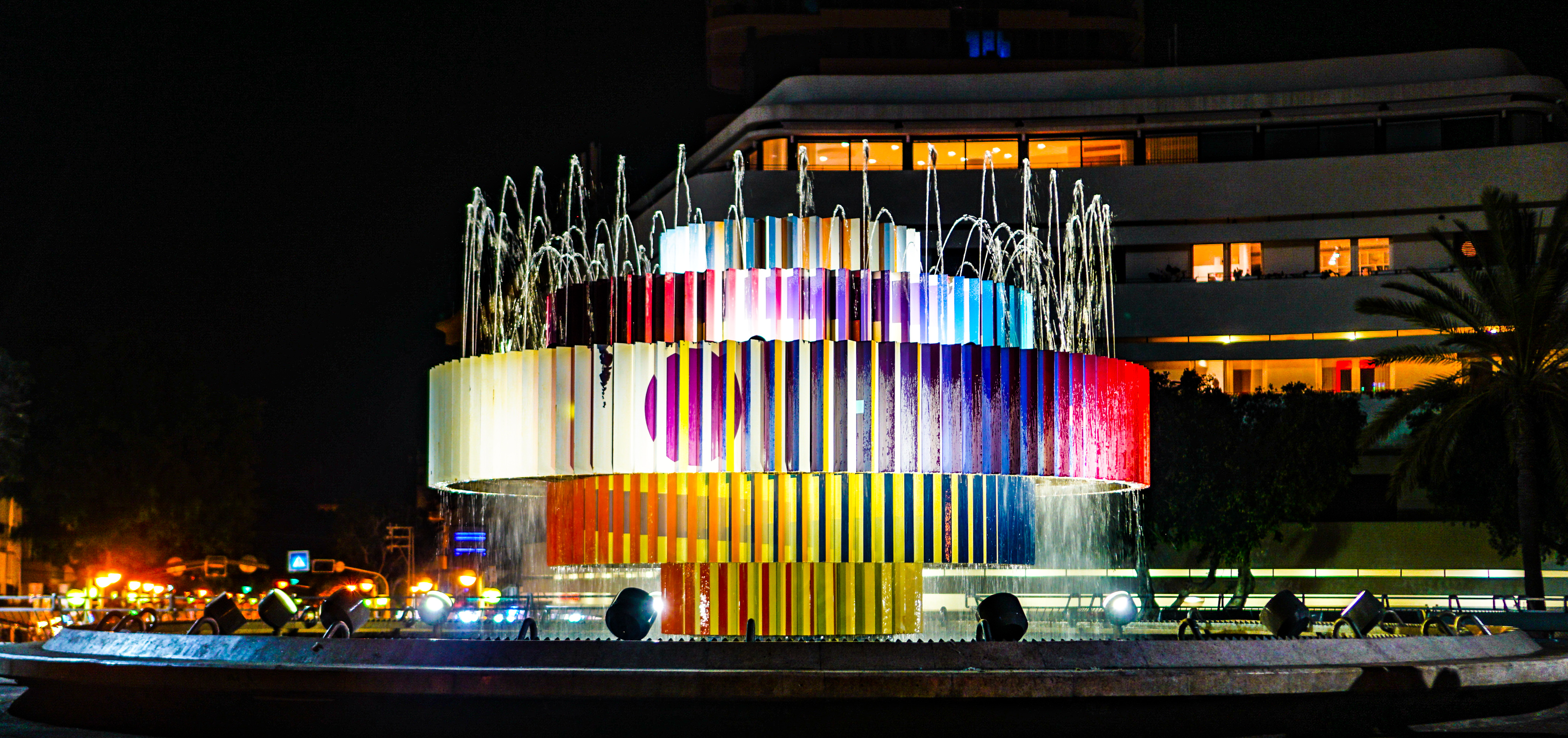
The square's Fire and Water Fountain (2016)

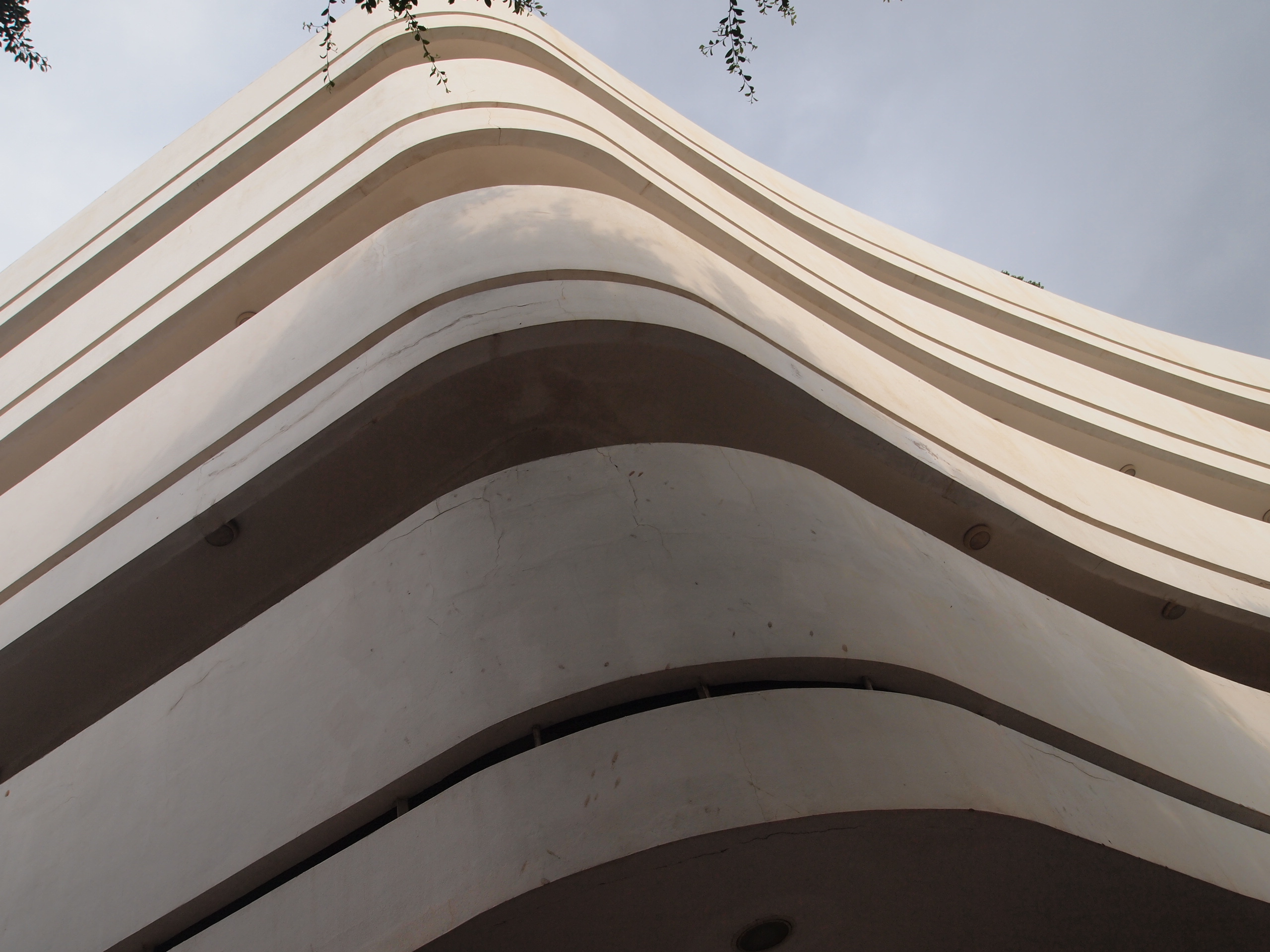
Hotel Cinema detail

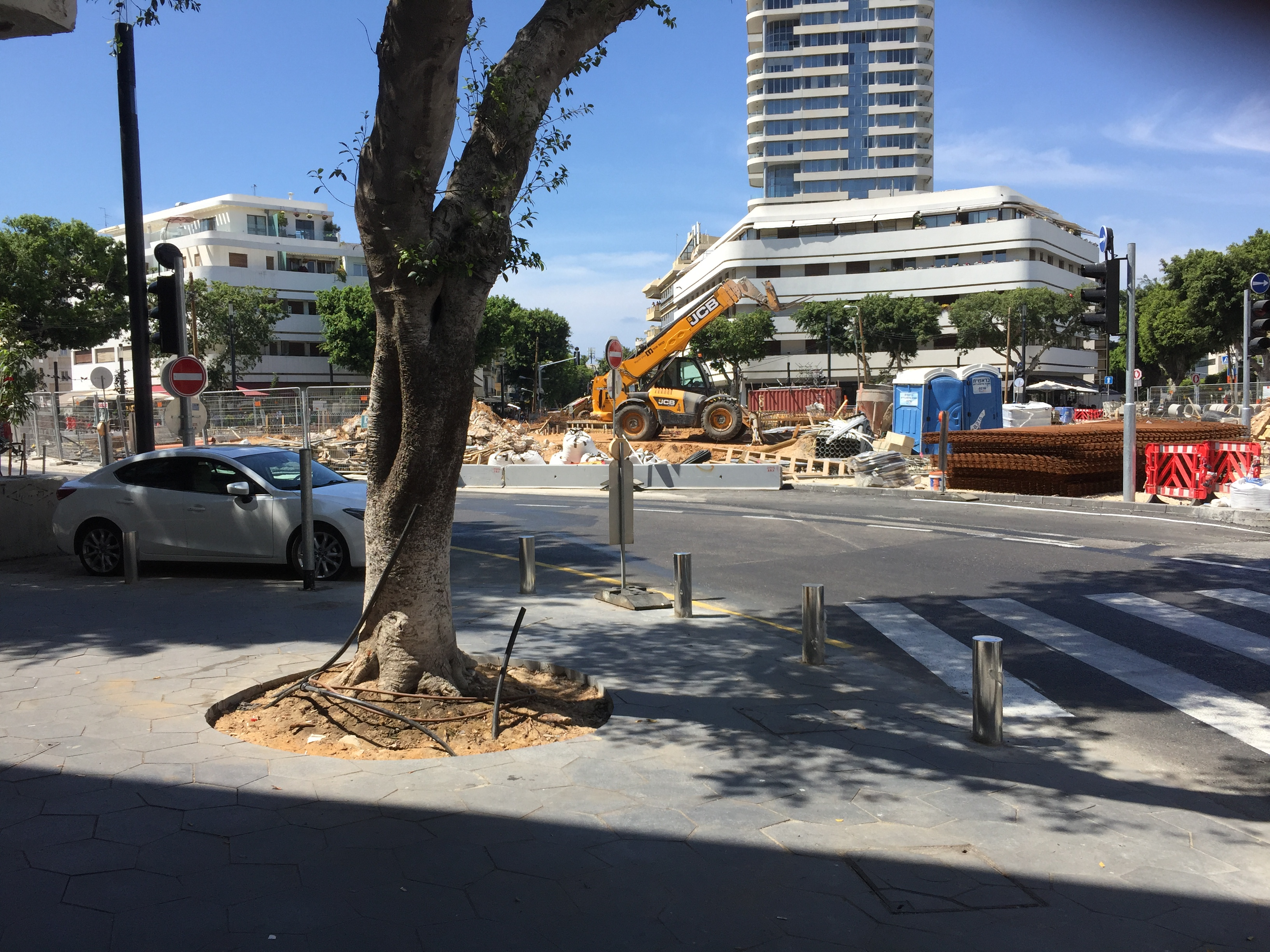
Dizengoff Square in June 2018
