= Morris Mandel =

American educator & journalist (1911–2009)

Morris Mandel (1911–2009) was an American educator and journalist.

== Biography ==
Morris Mandel was born in 1911 in Lublin, Poland. His family moved to the United States when he was three. His son Allen Mandel, is a rabbi. Mandel wrote advice columns for The Jewish Press, "Human Emotions" and "Youth Speaks Up," for close to five decades. He was English principal of Yeshiva Toras Emes; a guidance counselor in the New York City public school system; taught law and accounting; ran a singles group that produced many marriages, headed summer camps in the 1940s and 50s; lectured in the United States, Canada, and Israel; and wrote close to 50 books and raised funds for several Jewish causes.

== Journalistic career ==
Mandel addressed different audiences with different messages. His "Problems in Human Emotions" column sometimes said the seemingly obvious ("Even the darkest hour only has 60 minutes"), but in a way that found him being authoritatively cited
