= Yaacov Agam =

Israeli sculptor and experimental artist (1928–2026)

- יעקב אגם
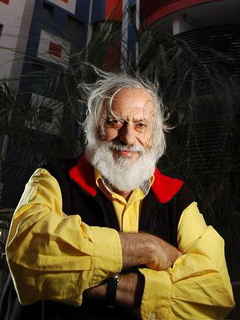
- Born: Yaakov Gibstein; 11 May 1928; Rishon LeZion, Mandatory Palestine
- Died: 21 June 2026 (aged 98); Rishon Le Zion, Israel
- Citizenship: Israeli
- Education: The Bezalel Academy of Art and Design in Jerusalem, the Kunstgewerbe Schule
- Occupations: Sculptor and experimental artist
- Known for: Contributions to optical and kinetic art
- Awards: Israel Prize (2026)

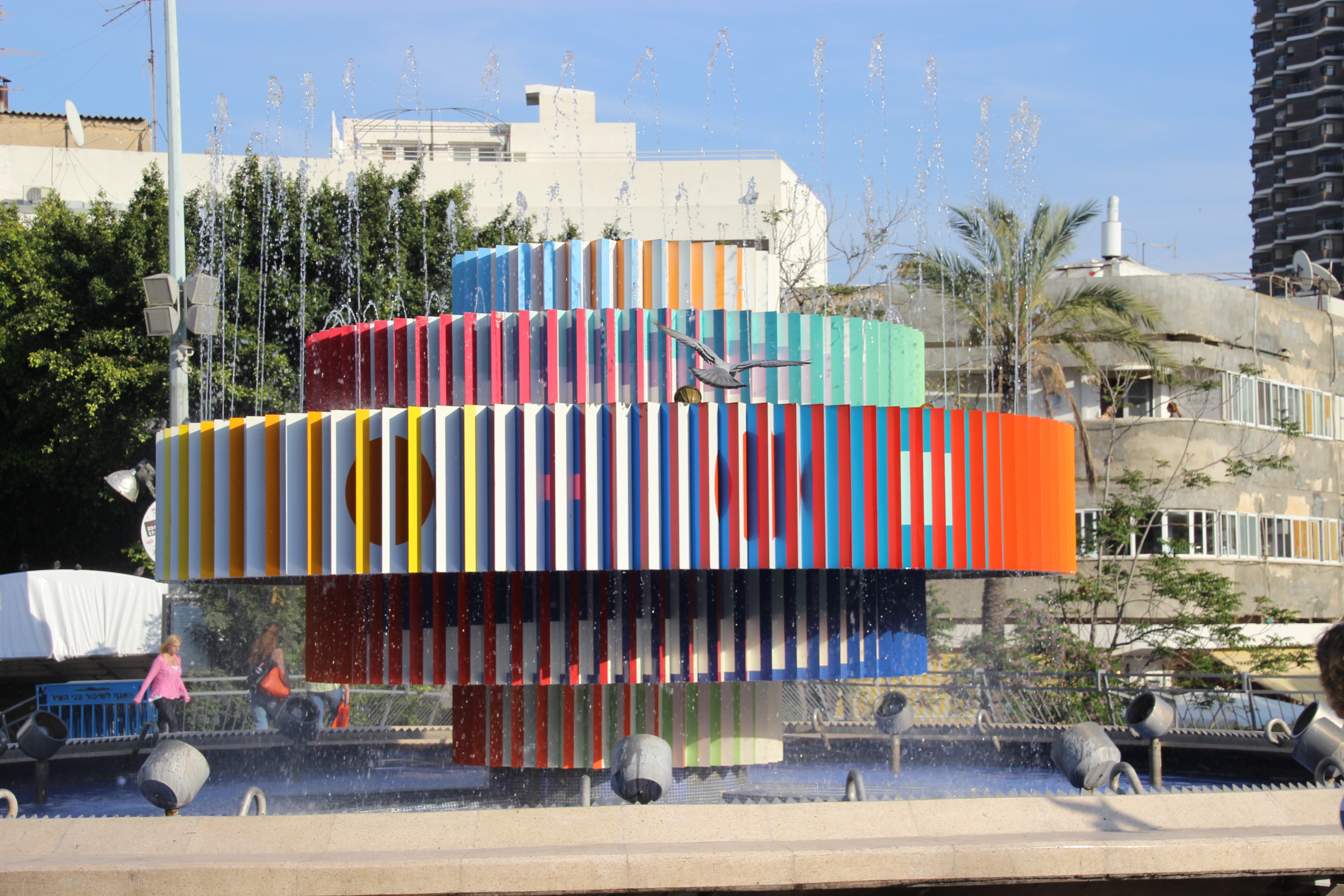
Fire and Water Fountain, Tel Aviv’s Dizengoff Square

Yaacov Agam (Hebrew: יעקב אגם; 11 May 1928 – 21 June 2026) was an Israeli sculptor and experimental artist widely known for his contributions to optical and kinetic art. In 2026, he received the Israel Prize for Visual Arts.

== Biography ==
Yaacov Gibstein (later Agam) was born in Rishon LeZion, Mandatory Palestine to Yehoshua Gibstein and Kendel Yokheved Gibstein (née Powembrowski). His father was a rabbi and a kabbalist. Both parents originally hailed from Augustów, Russian Poland.

As a child, Agam learned in heder. Agam trained at the Bezalel Academy of Art and Design in Jerusalem, where he was the student of Mordecai Ardon (1896–1992). In 1946, as an adolescent, he was arrested by British security forces as part of the Black Sabbath mass roundups, and spent several months in the Latrun detention camp.

In 1949, he relocated to Zurich, Switzerland, where he studied under Johannes Itten (1888–1967) at the Kunstgewerbe Schule. Agam was influenced by the painter and sculptor Max Bill (1908–1994).

In 1951, Agam moved to Paris, France, where he resided for the next few decades.

== Career ==
Agam's first solo exhibition was at the Galerie Craven, Paris, in 1953, and he exhibited three works at the 1954 Salon des Réalités Nouvelles and at the Le Mouvement exhibition at the Galerie Denise René, Paris, in 1955.

His work typically consists of abstract, kinetic art, that incorporates movement, viewer participation and the frequent use of light and sound. Many of his pieces are installed in prominent public places.

His best-known works include Double Metamorphosis III (1965), Visual Music Orchestration (1989), the fountain at the La Défense district in Paris (1975), the Fire and Water Fountain at Dizengoff Square in Tel Aviv (1986), and his design for the antechamber of President Georges Pompidou's private apartments at the Élysée Palace (1972–1974), which is now housed at the Centre Pompidou.

Agam was also known for a type of print referred to as "Agamograph", which uses barrier-grid animation to present radically different images, depending on the angle from which it is viewed. The lenticular technique was executed in large scale in the 30 ft (9.1 m) square "Complex Vision" (1969), mounted on the facade of the Callahan Eye Foundation Hospital in Birmingham, Alabama.

In 1972, Agam had a retrospective exhibition in Paris at the Musée National d'Art Moderne and at the Guggenheim Museum in New York City in 1980, among others. His works are held in numerous museum collections, including the Museum of Modern Art and the Mildred Lane Kemper Art Museum.

Agam was the subject of two 20th-century documentary films by American filmmaker Warren Forma: Possibilities of Agam (1967), and Agam and... (1980).

Agam designed and created the winner's trophy for the 1999 Eurovision Song Contest that was held in Jerusalem.

In 2009, at age 81, Agam created Peaceful Communication with the World, a monument for the World Games in Kaohsiung, Taiwan. It consists of nine 10 m (33 ft) high hexagonal pillars positioned in a rhomboid formation. The sides of the pillars are painted in different patterns and hues.

One of Agam's more notable creations is the menorah placed at the corner of Fifth Avenue and 59th Street in New York City during the celebration of the Jewish holiday of Hanukkah, sponsored by the Lubavitch Youth Organization. The 32 ft (9.8 m) high, gold colored, 4,000 lb (1,800 kg) steel structure is recognized by the Guinness Book of World Records as the "world's largest Hanukkah menorah".

In May 2014, Agam's piece Faith- Visual Pray was presented to Pope Francis by El Al Israel Airlines's president, David Maimon. The piece included significant symbols of both Jewish and Christian faiths.

Agam's work commands the highest prices of any Israeli artist. In a Sotheby's New York auction in November 2009, when his 4 Themes Contrepoint was sold for $326,500, he said: "This does not amaze me … my prices will go up, in keeping with the history I made in the art world".

In 2018, the Yaacov Agam Museum of Art (YAMA) opened in the artist's hometown of Rishon LeZion, Israel. Agam told the Jerusalem Post that it is "the only museum in the world that is dedicated to art in motion."

== Honours ==
In 1996, Agam was awarded the Jan Amos Comenius Medal by UNESCO for the "Agam Method" for visual education of young children.

In 2017, Agam was honoured with The Algemeiner's Warrior for Truth award at the newspaper's annual J100 Gala.

In 2026, Agam received the Israel Prize for Visual Arts.

== Personal life ==
Agam was married to Clila, who died aged 49. Agam dedicated to her the 20 "Pillars of Clila" that stand outside the Yaacov Agam Museum of Art in Rishon LeZion. They had three children together, the eldest being Ron Agam (born 1958), who is also an artist and is based in New York City. Agam's second wife was the French harpist Chantal Thomas d'Hoste, who survived him. Agam's brother, Hanania, served as mayor of Rishon LeZion.

== Death and legacy ==
Agam died on 21 June 2026, at his home in Rishon LeZion, at the age of 98.

Israel’s President Isaac Herzog, who personally knew Agam for many years, described him as a "fascinating individual". Herzog noted that Agam was "one of Israel's greatest artists and one of the most esteemed and renowned Israeli creators in the world", adding, "His artistic and human legacy will continue to accompany Israeli culture and art lovers in the country and around the world for many years to come."

Sports and Culture Minister, Miki Zohar, referred to Agam as "a groundbreaking artist who gave Israeli creation a unique and inspiring language", noting that "[h]is artistic legacy will continue to illuminate and influence generations of creators in Israel and around the world."

== Gallery ==
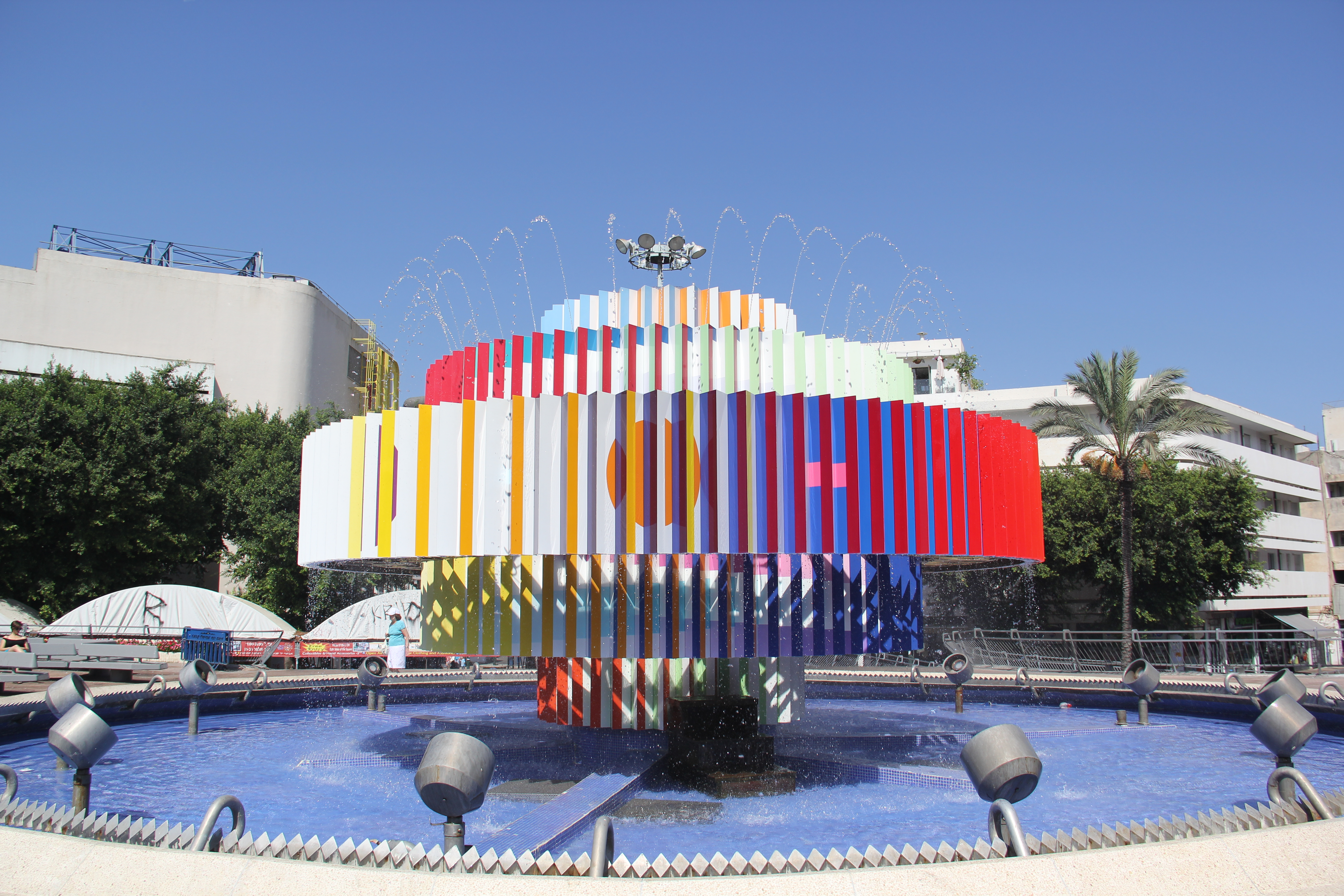
Fountain in Dizengoff Square in Tel Aviv

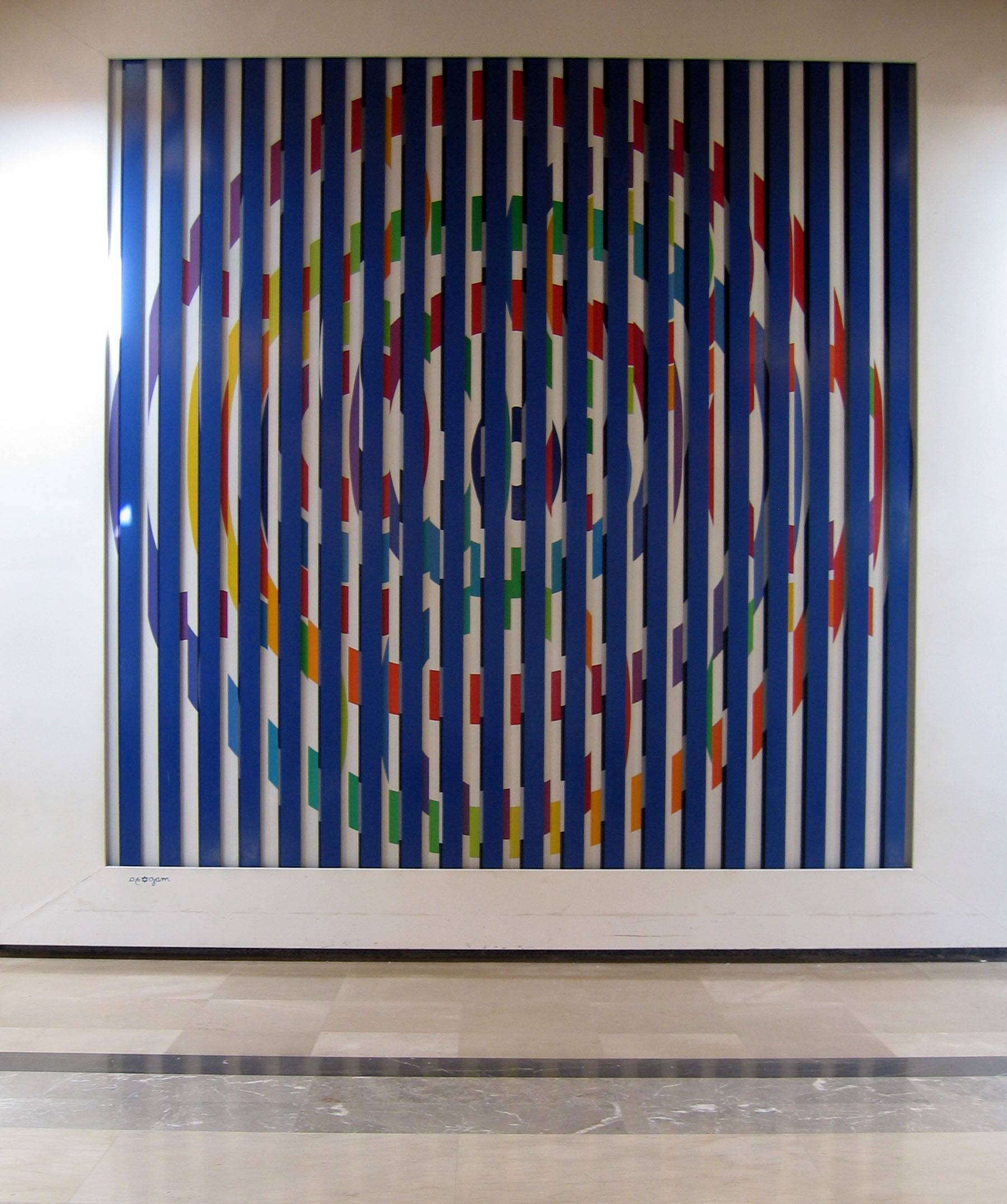
Work by Agam at the Sheba Medical Center, Israel

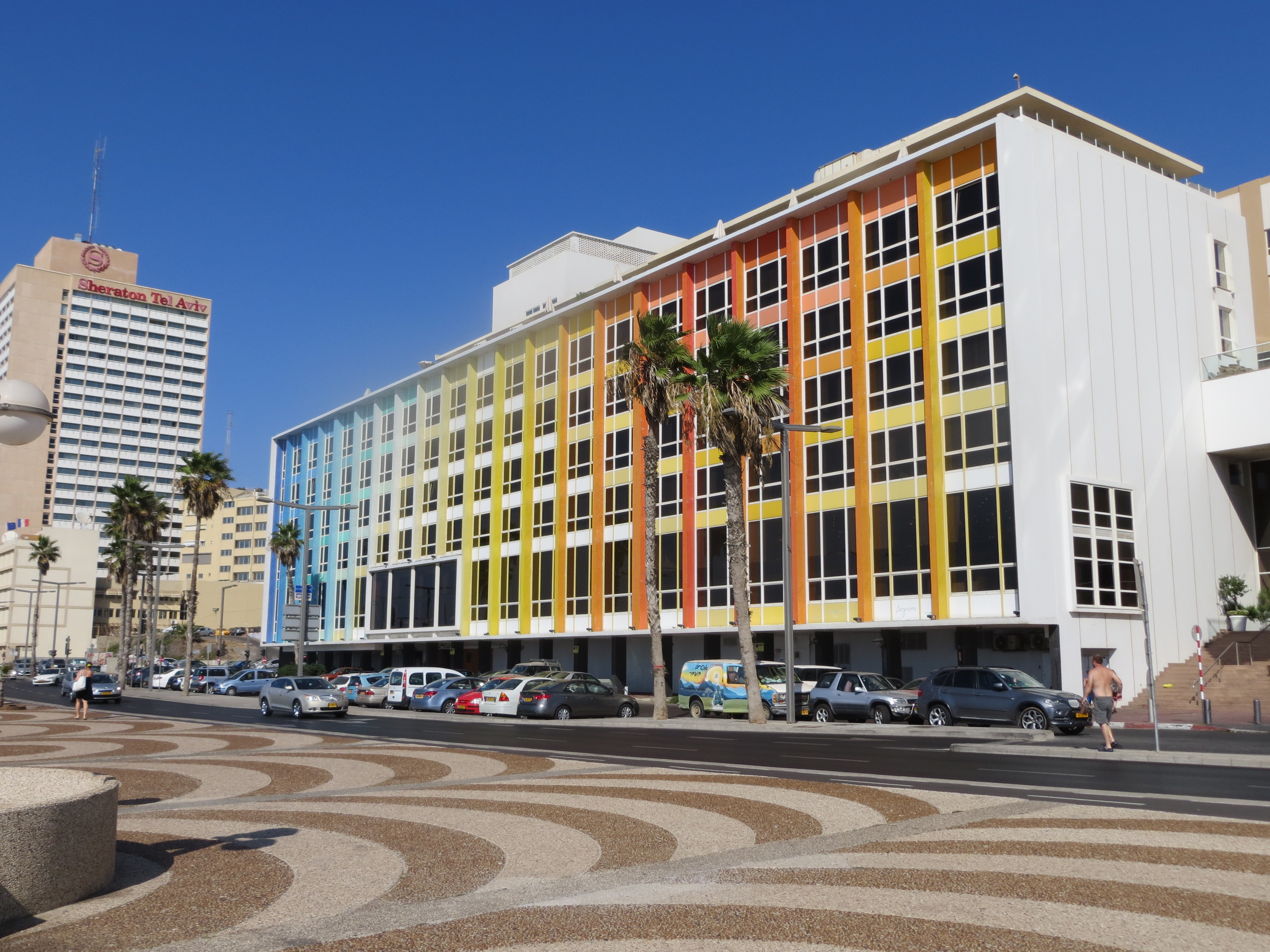
Facade of Dan Hotel, Tel Aviv

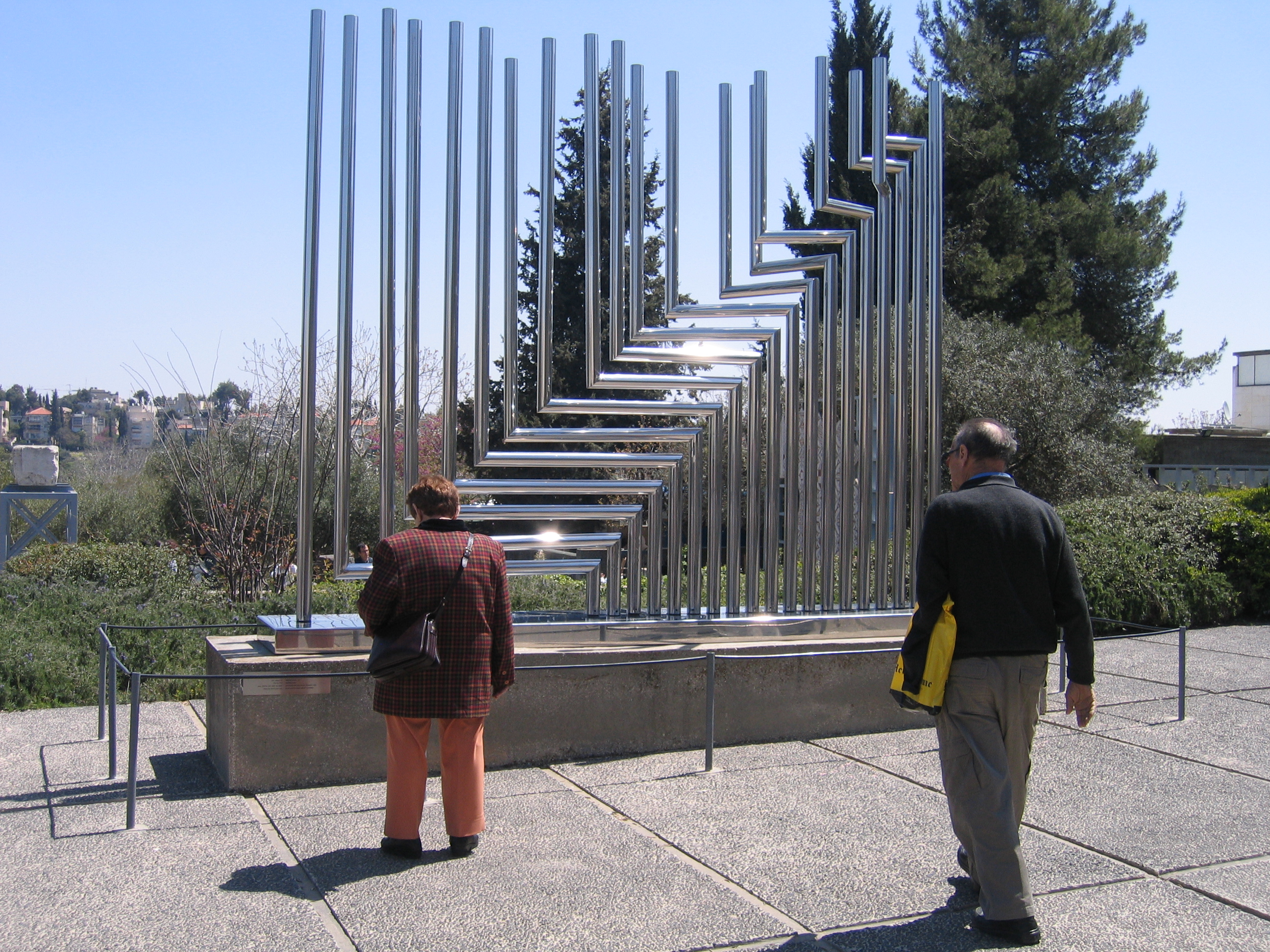
Eighteen Levels (1971)

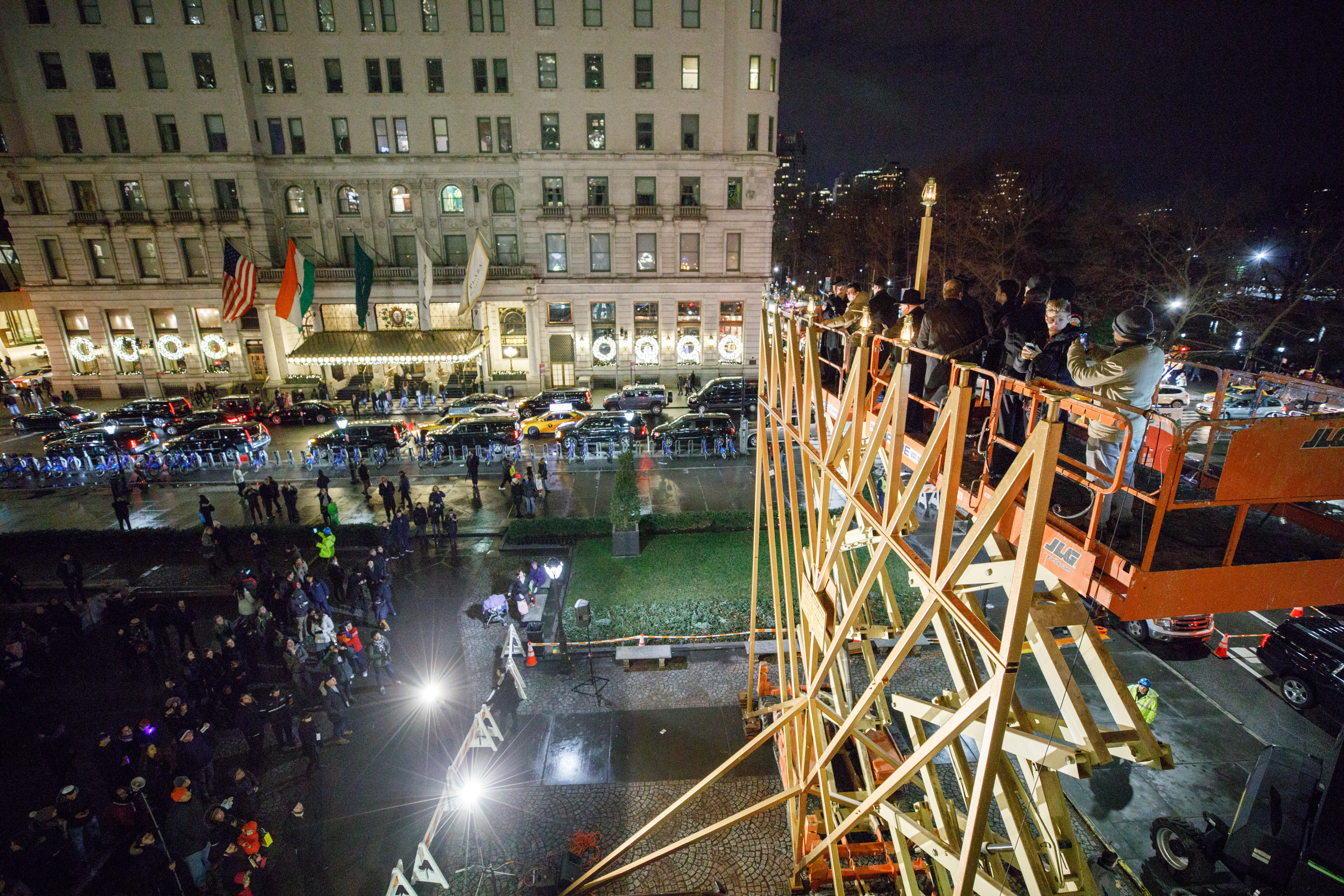
Lighting of World's Largest Menorah in New York City (2016)

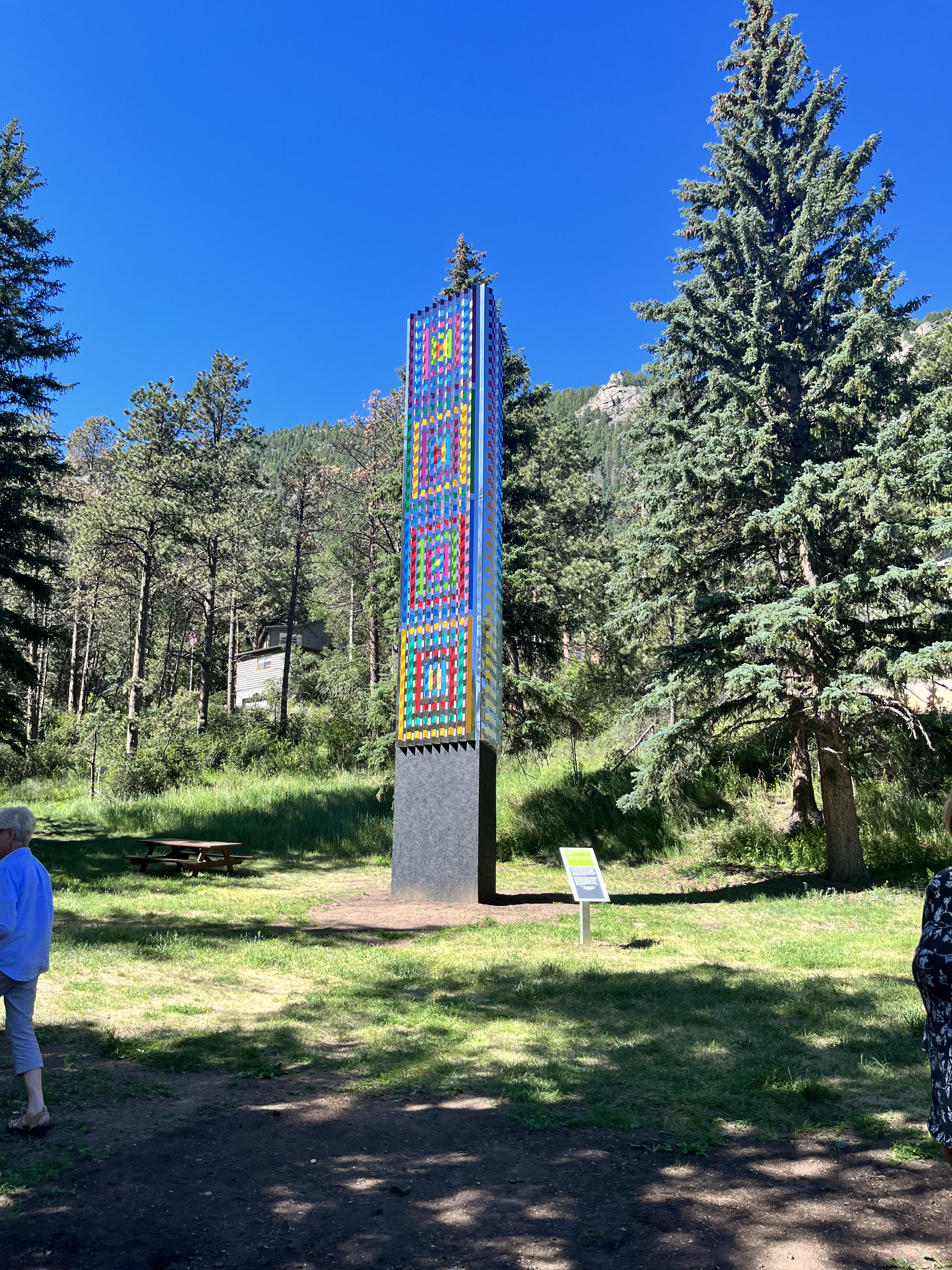
Work by Agam in Green Mountain Falls, Colorado (2022)

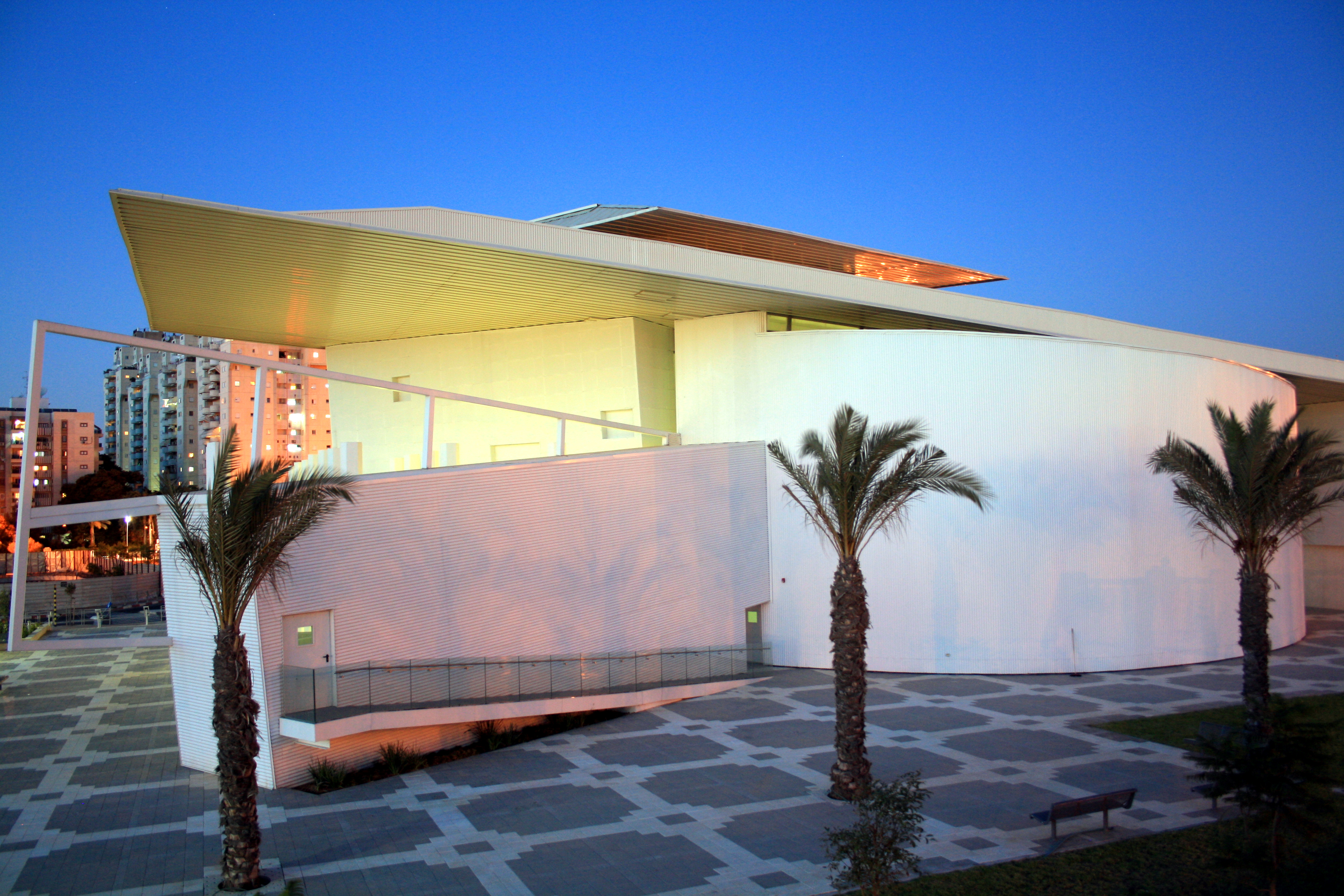
Yaacov Agam Museum in Rishon LeZion

== See also ==
- Visual arts in Israel
- List of public art in Israel

== Bibliography ==
- Ragon, Michel (1975). Agam: 54 mots cles pour une lecture polyphonique d'Agam (in French). Paris: Éditions Georges Fall. OCLC 2876738.
- Sayako Aragaki (2007). Agam. Beyond the Visible (3 ed.). Gefen Publishing House, Jerusalem/New York. ISBN 978-965-229-405-0.
- Solomon R. Guggenheim Museum (1980). Homage to Yaacov Agam. Solomon R. Guggenheim Museum exhibition. Leon Amiel, New York. ISBN 978-0-8148-0751-4.
- Frank Popper (1968). Origins and Development of Kinetic Art. Studio Vista and New York Graphic Society.
- Frank Popper (1990). Yaacov Agam (3 ed.). H.N. Abrams, New York. ISBN 978-0-8109-1897-9.
