= The Jewish Press =

American weekly newspaper based in Brooklyn, New York

- The Jewish Press (16 August 2002)
- Type: Weekly newspaper
- Format: Tabloid
- Editor: Shlomo Greenwald
- Founded: January 29, 1960; 66 years ago
- Political alignment: Conservative; Religiously: Modern Orthodox
- Headquarters: Brooklyn, New York, U.S.
- Circulation: 42,222 (as of 2017)
- ISSN: 0021-6674
- Website: jewishpress.com

The Jewish Press is an American weekly newspaper based in Brooklyn, New York City. It serves the Modern Orthodox Jewish community.

== History ==
The Jewish Press was co-founded in 1960 by Albert Klass and his brother Sholom Klass. The Klass brothers had previously co-published the Brooklyn Daily and Brooklyn Weekly newspapers in the 1940s. In 1960s, a group of leading rabbis approached the Klass brothers to publish a weekly English-language newspaper for Jews who were not fluent in Yiddish. This became The Jewish Press.

In March 2014, the newspaper fired editor Yori Yanover after he wrote an op-ed titled "50 Thousand Haredim March So Only Other Jews Die in War." The piece was in reference to a Haredi Jewish prayer rally in Manhattan protesting Haredi conscription in Israel.

Shlomo Greenwald, grandson of Shlomo Klass, has been the newspaper's top editor since May 2021.

== Editorial ==
The tabloid-style newspaper features distinctive blue-colored front page headlines. The newspaper includes Israel and local community news, commentaries on the weekly Torah portion, columns, and personal ads.

The Jewish Press describes itself as having a politically conservative viewpoint and editorial policy, and "politically incorrect long before the phrase was coined." According to Jeffrey Gurock, a historian at Yeshiva University, the newspaper is "representative of Brooklyn Jewry both in terms of its religious values and its social values." According to The Forward, The Jewish Press expresses right-wing political views and an "unapologetic presentation of Orthodoxy." As an example of this, a notice appeared on page 22B of the July 6, 1990 edition announcing the excommunication of Jewish U.S. Representative Barney Frank, citing his homosexuality. The notice added that the Rabbinical Alliance of America and the Union of Orthodox Rabbis, while not the initiators of the action, expressed their approval of it. Ultraconservative Catholic weekly The Wanderer reported about the notice, leading some Catholics to note with some irony that a similar process existed in the Catholic Church, pointing out that it had been regularly lambasted for carrying it out. However, it was clarified that the notice in The Jewish Press was posted by an outlier beth din (religious court) affiliated with a group called Jews for Morality, and that in reality Judaism lacked a centralized excommunication process. Abraham Hecht, president of the Rabbinical Alliance of America, said "If we were going to start excommunicating, we'd have a list as long as the New York telephone directory". Frank himself dismissed the notice, saying "I don't know any Jews who take it seriously, including my own rabbi."

== Influence and readership ==
The Times of Israel described The Jewish Press as an influential publication in Brooklyn's Orthodox Jewish community. The paper attracted a devoted following in Orthodox Jewish neighborhoods due to its "uncompromising advocacy of Orthodox issues" and strong support for Israel. In 1993, the paper had a weekly circulation of 125,000, out of 250,000 estimated readers of weekly Jewish newspapers. The Forward postulated that it had the greatest share of more religiously centrist Orthodox readers. According to the New York Jewish Week, the paper served as the voice for the English-speaking Orthodox community, and its influence grew as the community emerged as a political force. An endorsement by the paper became tantamount to major Orthodox political support. By 2010, it was still considered the leader among English-language newspapers in the Orthodox communities in the greater New York City area, with a weekly circulation of nearly 50,000 copies. According to Haaretz, the online version of The Jewish Press had a readership of 2 million views each month.

In 1987, "Country Yossi Toiv wrote and performed a song parody of Shel Silverstein's "The Cover of "Rolling Stone"" made popular by Dr. Hook entitled "The Cover of the Jewish Press".

== Contributors ==
Some of The Jewish Press's contributors include Jerold Auerbach, Hollywood screenwriter Robert J. Avrech, Louis Rene Beres, Phyllis Chesler, Paul Eidelberg, photographer Jacob Elbaz, historian and mathematician L. (Yitzchok) Levine, Morris Mandel, Steven Plaut, Marvin Schick, Martin Bodek, cartoonist Asher Schwartz, and legal ethicist and Judaica collector Saul Jay Singer, who writes a weekly column on Collecting Jewish History.

=== Religious ===
The Jewish Press features numerous weekly Torah columns regarding the weekly Torah portion, upcoming Jewish holidays, contemporary applications of Jewish law, philosophy, Talmud, and the teachings of Nachman of Breslov. Current and previous authors include Meir Kahane, Esther Jungreis, Dovid Goldwasser, David Hollander, Rafael Grossman, Hanoch Teller, Berel Wein, Isaac C. Avigdor, Steven Pruzansky, Gershon Tannenbaum, Emanuel Quint, J. Simcha Cohen, Francis Nataf, and Nathan Lopes Cardozo.

=== Political ===
During the mid-1970s, Ronald Reagan wrote a weekly column for the paper. Other contributing current and previous elected officials included Israeli prime minister Menachem Begin, Knesset members Menachem Porush, Yisrael Eichler and Moshe Feiglin, New York City Mayor Ed Koch, Dov Hikind and Simcha Felder.

=== Bloggers ===
Among the blogs and bloggers published on JewishPress.com are Donny Fuchs, Paula R. Stern's A Soldier's Mother, Jameel @ The Muqata, JoeSettler, Harry Maryle's Emes ve-Emuna, @IsraelShield, Batya Medad's Shiloh Musings, Frimet and Arnold Roth's This Ongoing War, David Israel, Israel Mizrahi's musings on rare and unusual Jewish books, and Ambassador (ret.) Yoram Ettinger's The Ettinger Report.

=== Former ===
Former contributors to the newspaper have included Jason Maoz, satirist Arnold Fine, and Julius Liebb.
