= Public menorah =

Public display during Hanukkah

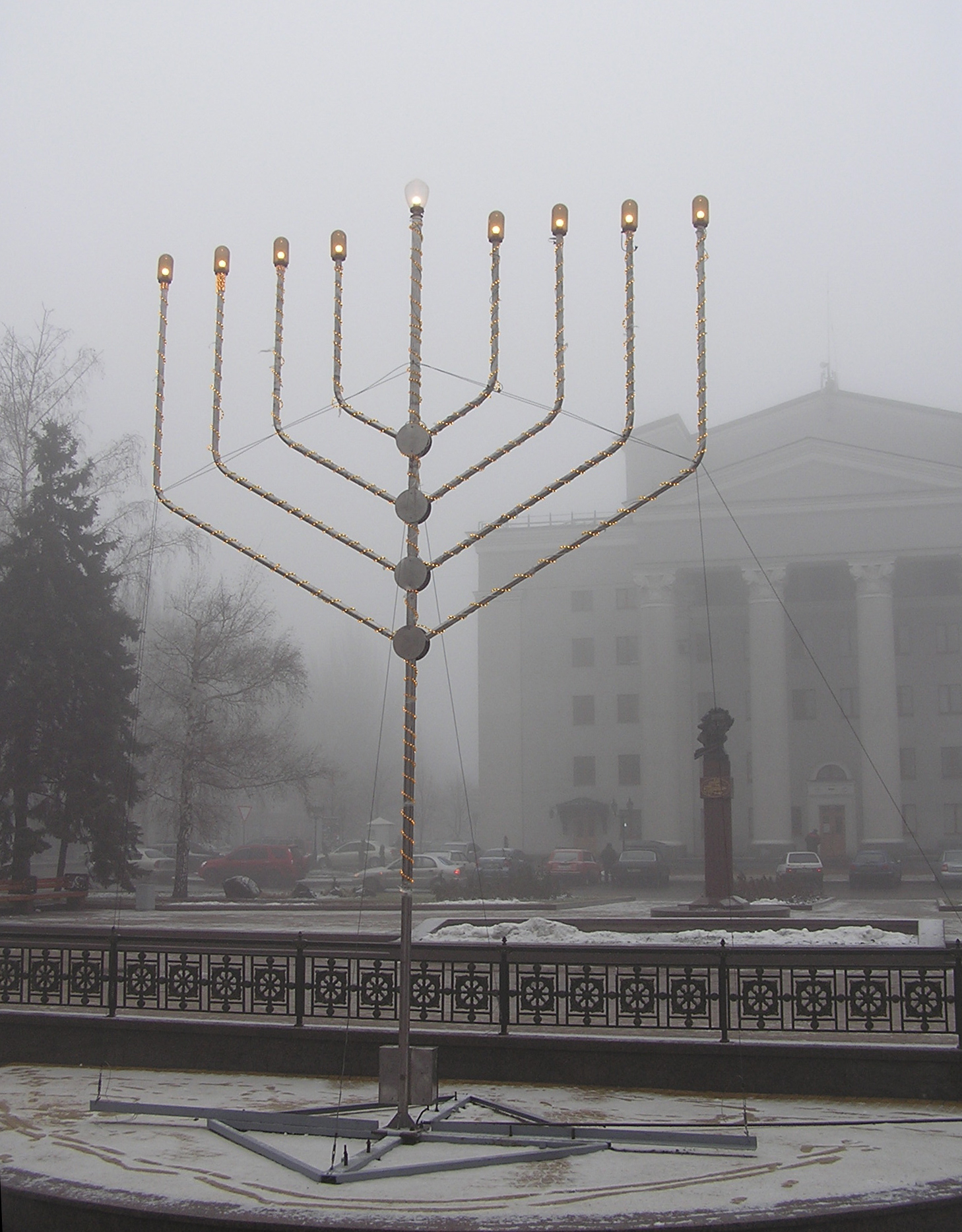
A public Hanukkah menorah in Donetsk, Ukraine.

A public menorah is a large menorah displayed publicly during the Jewish holiday of Hanukkah. It is done to celebrate the holiday and publicize the miracle of Hanukkah, and is typically accompanied by a public event during one of the nights of Hanukkah attended by invited dignitaries who are honored with lighting the menorah.

Public menorah lighting were initiated by Chabad Lubavitch Rebbe Menachem M. Schneerson in 1974. The most prominent public menorah celebration takes place in Washington, D.C., and is known as the National Menorah. In 2013 Chabad planned 15,000 public menorah lighting events across the globe.

As Rabbi Schneerson concluded in 1982 that a drawing by Maimonides definitively proved that menorahs were supposed to have straight arms pointing upwards diagonally, public menorahs erected by Chabad since then are typically of this design rather than using the rounded branches more commonly associated with menorahs.

== History ==
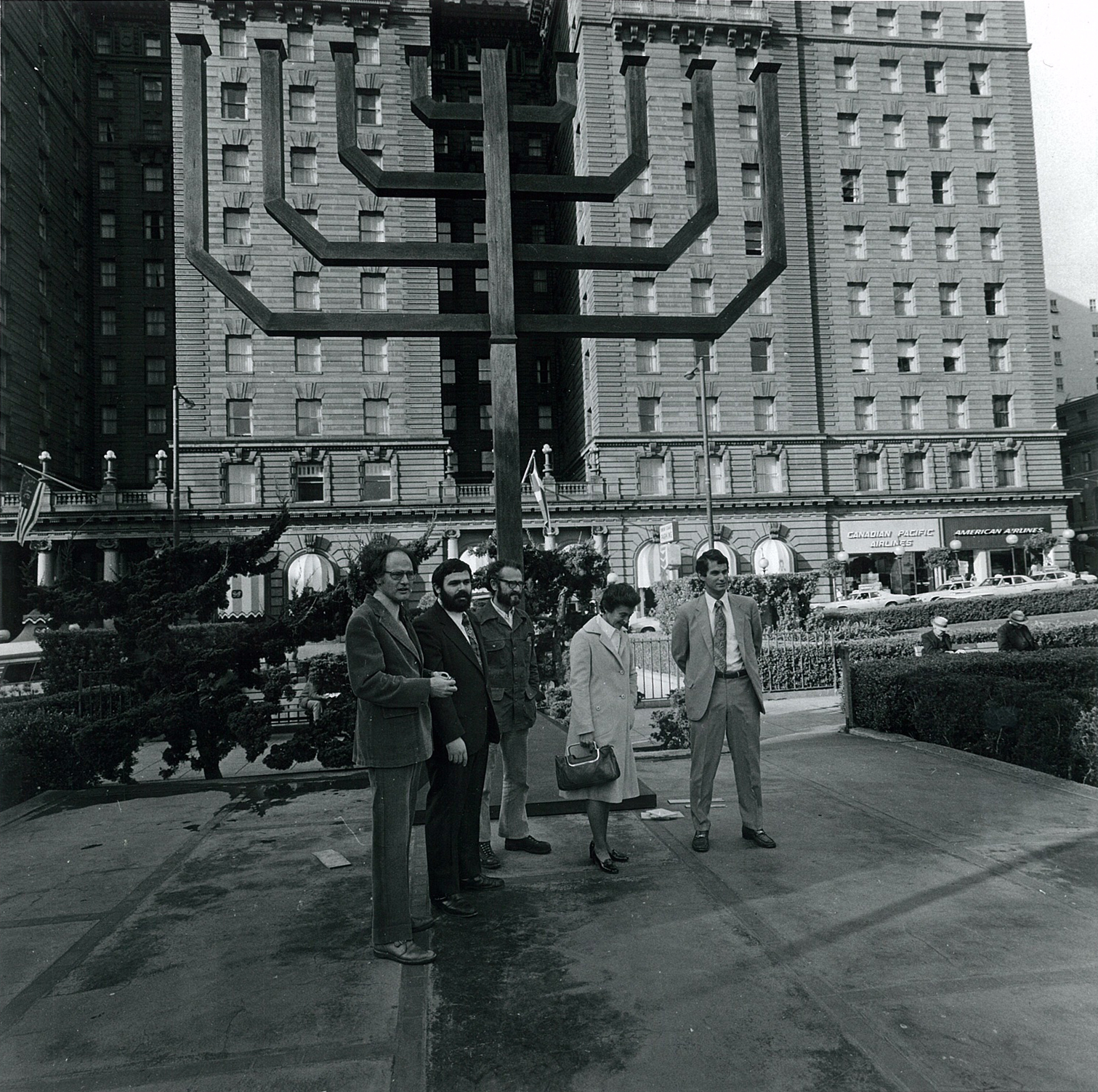
Chabad-Lubavitch Rabbi Chaim Drizin (second from left) stands with others at the first lighting of the Bill Graham Menorah in Union Square in 1975

There are two menorahs common throughout Jewish history. The Chanuka menorah usually has 9 sticks. 8 to commemorate each day of Chanuka, and a ninth one to light them. This tradition is from the period of the Maccabean revolt. The other menorah has 7 candles. It is from the most holy place in the temple and represents the spirit of God. The 7 candles are to be perpetually burning. This dates back to the Exodus from Egypt (Ex. 25:31-40) and was used in the Tabernacle in the Wilderness and the first Jewish temple. The concept of lighting a menorah in a way that allows the public to see it dates back to ancient times, where menorahs were lit outside of people's homes in order to publicize the miracle of Hanukkah. The concept of lighting a large menorah in public was initiated by Rabbi Menachem M. Schneerson (the Lubavitcher Rebbe) in 1973. He launched his Hanukkah-awareness campaign by encouraging his followers and emissaries to reach out to their fellow Jews and give them the opportunity to kindle the Hanukkah lights. That year they distributed some 60,000 tin menorahs. In 1974, Rabbi Abraham Shemtov kindled a menorah at the foot of the Liberty Bell at Independence Hall. The following year, in 1975, rock promoter Bill Graham sponsored Chabad's menorah in San Francisco. Since 1974, the concept of public menorahs expanded and in 1979, President Jimmy Carter participated in the lighting of a public menorah erected by Chabad. In 2014, then-Vice President Joe Biden kindled a public menorah in Washington, D.C.

In 2013, Chabad planned 15,000 public menorah lighting events across the globe. Some believe the Hanukkah-awareness campaign has been a prime factor in the festival becoming so widely celebrated. But the initiative has also faced opposition from within the Jewish community, both from Conservative and Reform Jewish organizations, as well as from the Orthodox Union and Agudath Israel.

== Notable public menorah lightings ==
=== United States ===
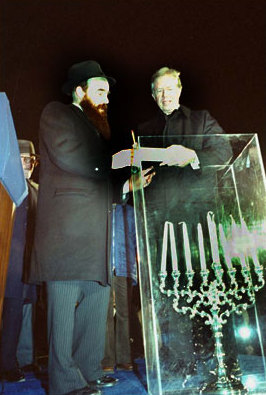
US President Jimmy Carter attends Chabad's Menorah Lighting in Washington, D.C. in 1979

Since 1979, the National Menorah has been lit on the White House grounds in celebration of Hanukkah. President Jimmy Carter attended that first ceremony, and President Ronald Reagan designated it the National Menorah. In 2009 the ceremony included then-White House Chief of Staff Rahm Emanuel, followed by Chief of Staff Jack Lew in 2010 and 2011. In 2012, the first candle was lit with the help of Jeffrey Zients, director of the White House Office of Management and Budget.

The world's largest menorah stands at 32 feet (9.8 m) and is lit at Fifth Avenue and 59th Street in Manhattan near Central Park. A 4,000-pound (1,800 kg) structure, it is the work of Israeli artist Yaacov Agam. Because of the menorah's height, Con Edison assists the lighting by using a crane to lift each person to the top.

=== Canada ===
A large menorah is located at Toronto City Hall at the south east corner of Nathan Phillips Square during Hanukkah. as well as a smaller one at Old City Hall.

=== United Kingdom ===
Each year, the House of Commons of the United Kingdom holds a menorah lighting at the home of the Speaker of the House of Commons. The menorah currently used was commissioned by the Rt. Hon. Michael J. Martin MP, former Speaker of the House of Commons.

Since 2007, Chabad has organized a public menorah celebration at Trafalgar Square. Each year the event is sponsored by Chabad, the Jewish Leadership Council, the London Jewish Forum and the mayor of London.

=== Israel ===
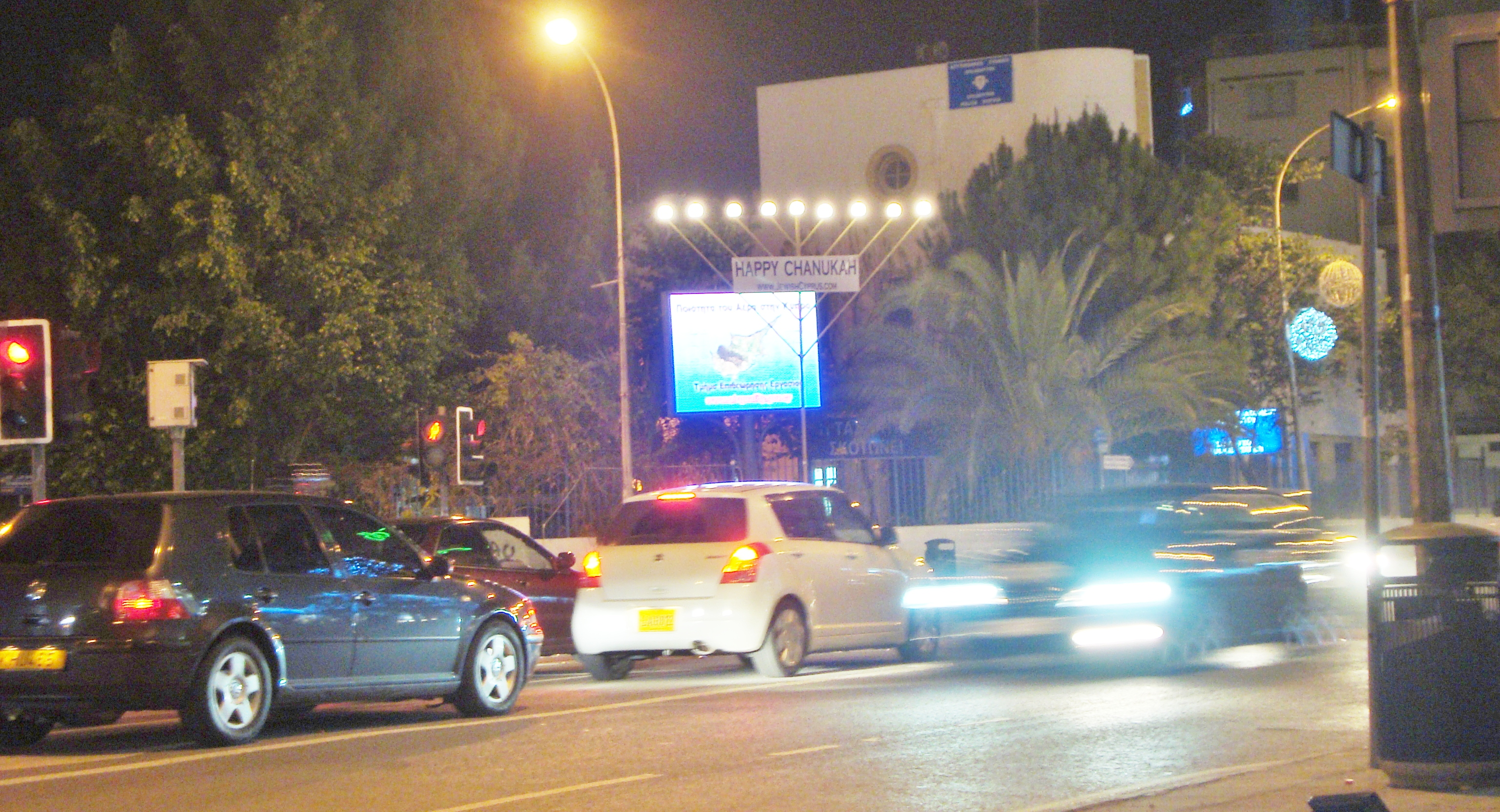
Public Hanukkah menorah in Nicosia, Cyprus

The Hanukkiah of Hope has become a prominent public installation in Israel, displayed in central locations including Hostages Square in Tel Aviv.

Public menorahs are prominently displayed throughout Israel, notably in the Ben Gurion airport.

=== Cyprus ===
Each year the Cypriot capital of Nicosia has lit a National Menorah in its city center.

=== Ukraine ===
December 23, 2019 saw the first Hanukkah candle lighting in Ukraine's parliament since the election of Volodymyr Zelenskyy, Ukraine's first Jewish president. Chief Rabbi of Kyiv Rabbi Jonathan Markovitch led the event. Among the 200 guests were Israeli Ambassador to Ukraine Joel Lion; Israeli honorary consul Oleg Vyshniakov; co-chairs of the group on inter-parliamentary relations with the State of Israel, Oleksandr Kunytskyi and Danylo Hetmantsev; and 80 members of parliament.

On 18 December 2022, 10 months into the full-scale Russian invasion, and days after the most recent targeting of Ukraine's gas infrastructure, the City of Kyiv lit what is claimed to be Europe's tallest menorah, (at 12-meters tall) in Maidan Nezalezhnosti square.

In December 2024 in Kyiv, chief of the Main Directorate of Intelligence of Ukraine Kyrylo Budanov ceremonially lit the first candle on a hanukkiah made from fragments of Russian drones and rockets fired at Ukraine.

=== Uruguay ===
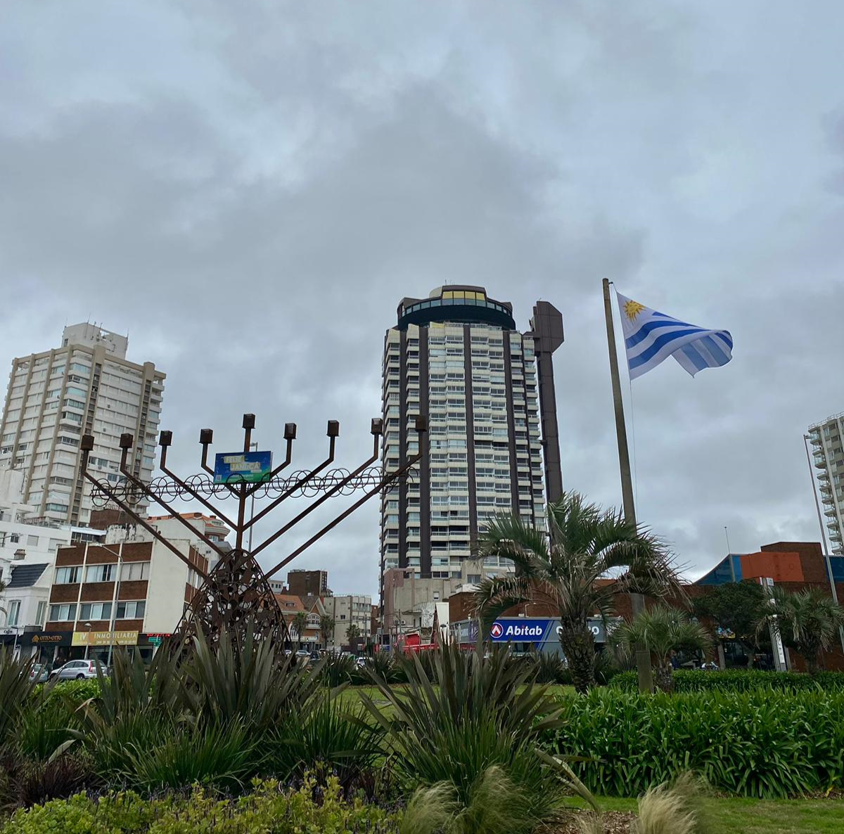
Public menorah in Punta del Este, Uruguay

Each year in the Plaza Trouville in the Punta Carretas neighborhood of Montevideo a public menorah is held, and the lighting ceremony is attended by city and national authorities. The first time that a public menorah was installed in Uruguay was in 1985 in Villa Biarritz Park. Intendant of Montevideo Jorge Luis Elizalde attended that first ceremony.

A public menorah is also displayed annually in Punta del Este.

== Controversy ==
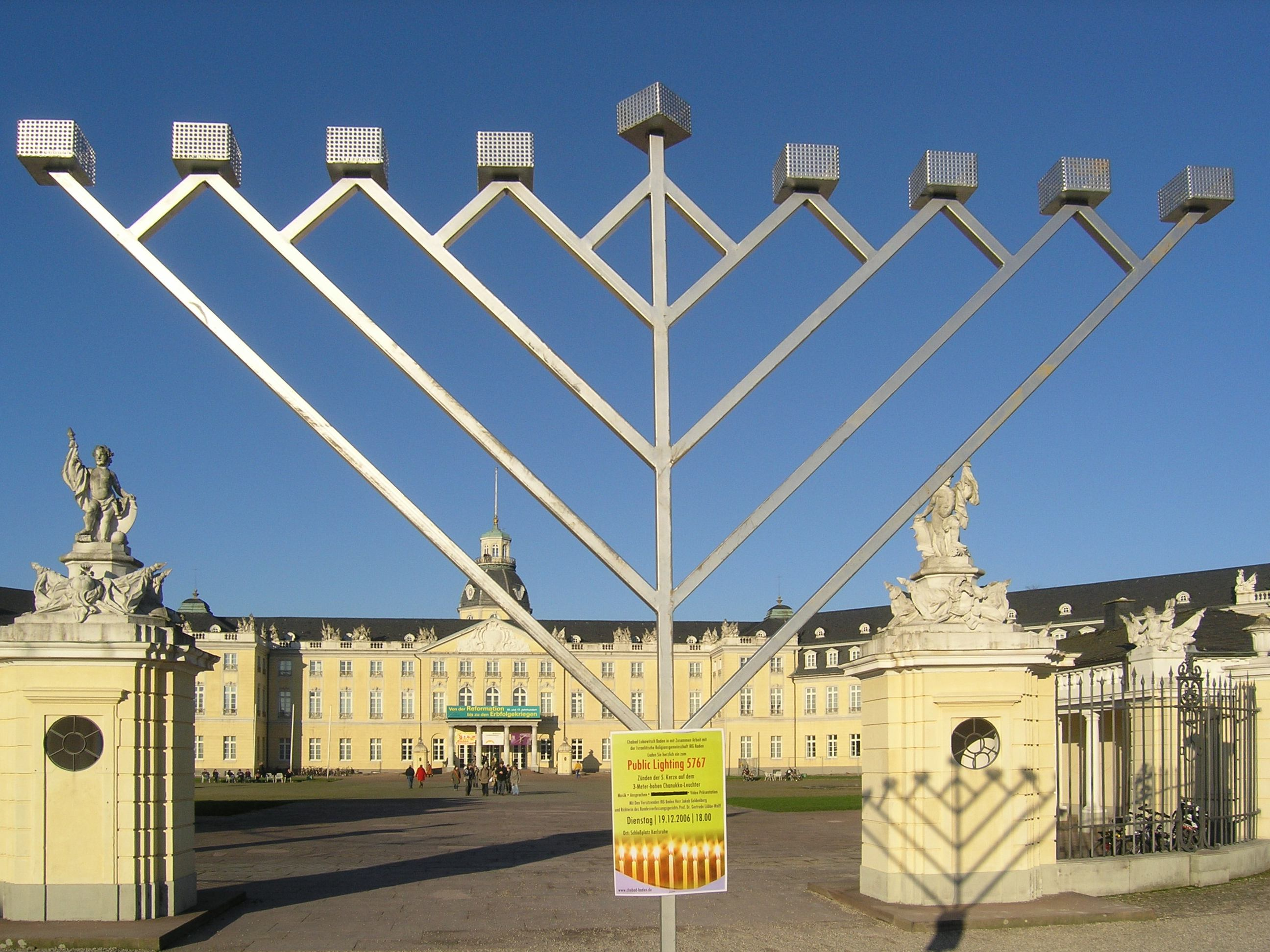
A large Chabad-style menorah in front of the Karlsruhe Palace in Karlsruhe, Germany before a public Chabad-Lubavitch menorah lighting ceremony (2006).

The success of the public menorah campaign has not been without controversy. In 1988, the American Jewish Congress produced a 28-page report entitled "The Year of the Menorah", criticizing Chabad's public menorah campaign and the litigation that went with it. It complained of the increase in the number of menorahs placed on public lands, arguing that it was causing tension both within the community and with non-Jews. In 1989, the ACLU challenged the legality of a display of a Chabad-owned public menorah in County of Allegheny. In a court case County of Allegheny v. ACLU the United States Supreme Court ruled in favor of the menorah.

In 1989, the city of Burlington, Vermont denied the local Chabad chapter, headed by Rabbi Yitzchok Raskin permission to erect a menorah in the city's main park during Hanukkah. Raskin appealed the decision on two occasions after an initial hearing 1987 found the display to be unconstitutional under the Establishment Clause of the First Amendment. The ACLU assisted the City of Burlington in a final appeal in the United States Court of Appeals for the Second Circuit in 1991, and the menorah ban was upheld. There have been similar cases involving Chabad public menorahs with the courts ruling against Chabad, including Chicago (1990) Iowa (1986), Cincinnati (1991), and Georgia (1991). In addition, in 1991, in White Plains, New York, the Common Council unanimously rejected the display of a Chabad menorah in a public space in the town with the support of many Jews, affirming a local tradition of keeping parks free of religious and political displays.

On the other hand, in 2002, the U.S. Supreme Court allowed Rabbi Sholom B. Kalmanson of Chabad of Southern Ohio to light an 18-foot-tall (5.5 m) menorah in Cincinnati's Fountain Square. Justice John Paul Stevens upheld a lower court ruling that the city could not ban the menorah and other religious displays from the square.

Due to the menorah being a Jewish symbol, menorahs in public have been subject to anti-Semitic violence. For instance, in 2009 in Moldova, a group of fundamentalist Orthodox Christians took down a public menorah and replaced it with a cross. The same year, in Vienna, Austria, a Chabad rabbi was attacked by a Muslim man while leading the candle lighting ceremony.

Controversy has also arisen at the Western Wall in Israel. For Hanukkah every year a giant menorah is erected in the men's section of the Western Wall and each night of the eight nights of the festival, male rabbis and male politicians are honored, while women are kept at a distance, where they are barely able to see the ceremony. Women of the Wall sent a letter to Prime Minister Benjamin Netanyahu requesting a large menorah also be erected in the women's section, but Netanyahu simply forwarded the letter to Western Wall rabbi Shmuel Rabinowitz, who accused WoW of ulterior motives of trying to change the customs at the Wall. Responding to Rabinowitz' accusation, Anat Hoffman noted: "In his letter, Rabbi Rabinowitz speaks of bringing together and uniting the nation, and yet his actions exclude and discriminate against women as if women are not part of the same nation. Since he was chosen for this public position, Rabinowitz has never invited Women of the Wall or any other women to participate in the ceremonies or to be honored with the lighting of a candle at the Kotel on Hanukkah, despite the fact that women are obligated equally to men in this religious act." In December 2014 the personal menorahs the women brought to the Kotel were confiscated, but they were returned when police were called.
