= National Menorah =

Public menorah in Washington, D.C., US

Lighting of the National Menorah
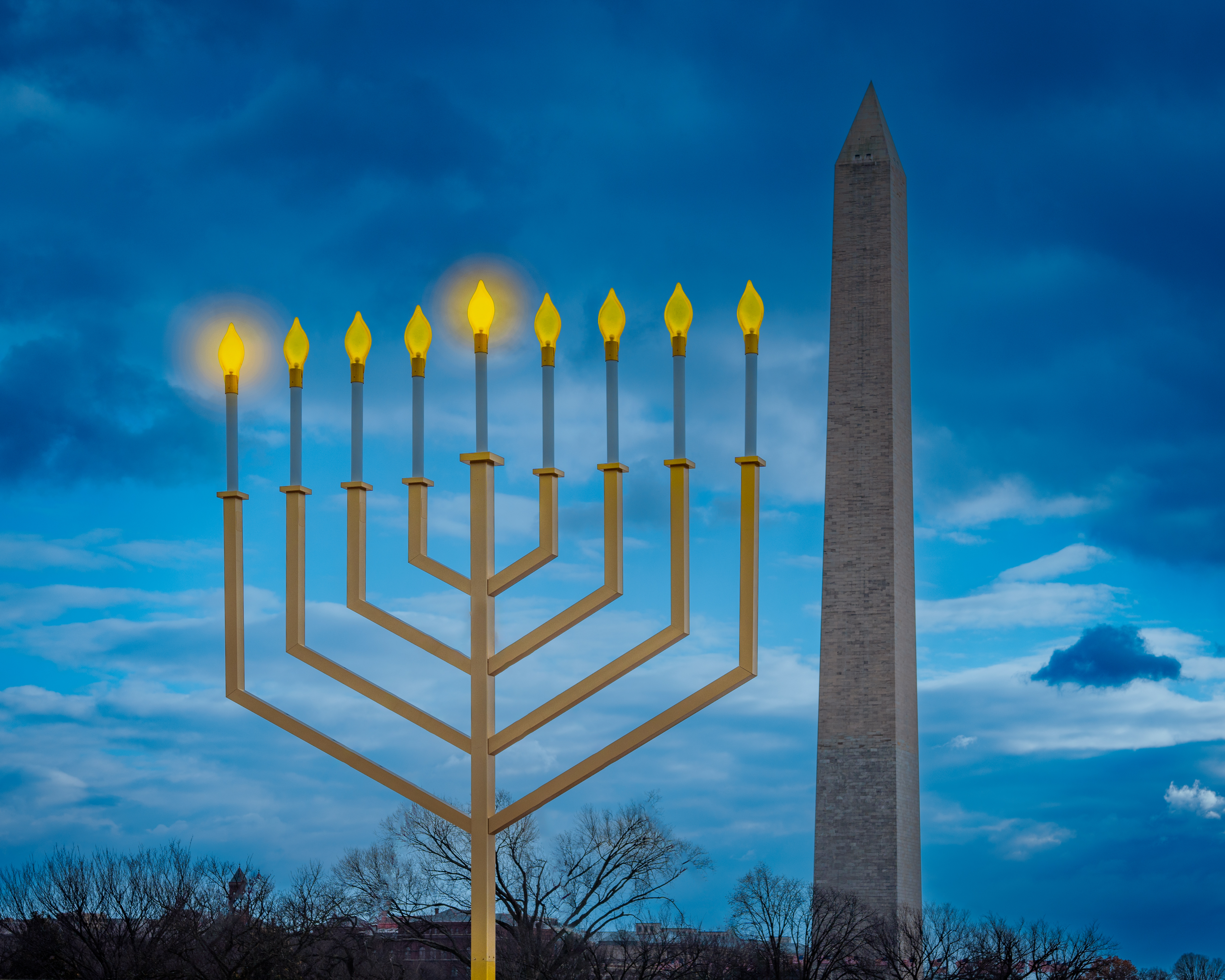
- U.S. National Menorah in 2023 with the Washington Monument in the background
- Frequency: Annual
- Locations: The Ellipse, Washington, D.C., U.S.
- Years active: 1979-present
- Website: NationalMenorah.org

The National Menorah is a large Hanukkah menorah located in the northeast quadrant of The Ellipse near the White House in Washington, D.C. It was first lit in 1979 by President Jimmy Carter, and has been erected and lit every year since. The Menorah has grown in size as well, and is now 30 feet (9.1 m) high.

== History ==
In 1973 Rabbi Menachem M. Schneerson called for the public awareness of the festival of Hanukkah and encouraged the lighting of public menorahs. Although initially criticized by liberal Jewish organizations, Schneerson defended the campaign.

In 1979, Abraham Shemtov of Chabad sought to erect a menorah on the White House lawn. Cecil D. Andrus, the Secretary of the Interior, initially denied Shemtov a permit to put a menorah on government property, saying it would violate the First Amendment. Stuart E. Eizenstat eventually settled the matter and a permit was granted. The menorah was designed, fabricated, and installed by the Art Display Company, a custom sign and awning firm founded in 1947. To this day, Art Display Co., still maintains and installs the menorah each year.

That year, President Jimmy Carter lit the menorah and delivered brief remarks. Every president since has recognized Hanukkah with a special menorah-lighting.

President Ronald Reagan is credited with naming it the National Menorah in a statement read during the menorah-lighting in Lafayette Park in 1982.

As of 2013, the Menorah was 30 feet (9.1 m) high, and rested on an elevated platform 2 feet (0.61 m) high. The height of the hanukiah and platform are regulated by rabbinical law, which requires the menorah to be both visible (minimum height off the ground) and of a maximum height (a person must look upward but not uncomfortably so).

== Event ==
The Menorah is erected each year by Abraham Shemtov and Levi Shemtov and sponsored by American Friends of Chabad-Lubavitch, as part of the campaign initiated by Rabbi Menachem M. Schneerson to raise awareness and hold public Hanukkah celebrations.

The National Menorah annual event is broadcast by C-SPAN each year. It includes a music presentation of festive Hanukkah songs by the United States Army Band. A U.S. ambassador or member of the cabinet has participated in the Menorah lighting each year. In 2004, all 50 U.S. governors issued proclamations in honor of the National Menorah.

Scholars have cited this initiative as a prime factor in Hanukkah becoming a widely celebrated festival.

== Dignitary kindlers ==
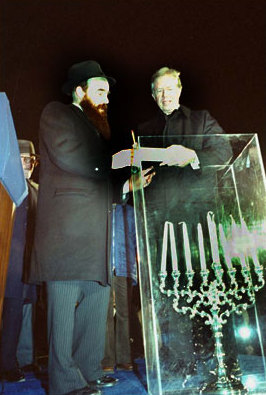
President Jimmy Carter (right) at first Hanukkah menorah lighting in 1979.

Every year since then, a member of the President's administration has participated and made formal remarks during the lighting ceremony. Those who participated in the National Menorah event include:

- 1979: Jimmy Carter, President of the United States.
- 1994: Joe Lieberman, U.S. Senator from Connecticut
- 1996: Stuart Eizenstat and Joe Lieberman
- 1997: Stuart Eizenstat
- 1998: Jack Lew
- 2000: Stuart Eizenstat
- 2006: Susan Schwab
- 2007: Michael Mukasey, U.S. Attorney General
- 2008: Joshua B. Bolten, White House Chief of Staff
- 2009: Rahm Emanuel, White House Chief of Staff
- 2010: David Bernhardt, U.S. Secretary of the Interior
- 2011: Jack Lew, Director of the Office of Management and Budget
- 2012: Jeffrey Zients, acting Director of the Office of Management and Budget
- 2013: Michael Froman, U.S. Trade Representative
- 2014: Joe Biden, U.S. Vice President
- 2015: Denis McDonough, White House Chief of Staff
- 2016: Adam Szubin, acting Under Secretary of the Treasury for Terrorism and Financial Intelligence
- 2017: Gary Cohn, White House chief economic adviser
- 2018: Ryan Zinke, Interior Secretary
- 2019: David Bernhardt, U.S. Interior Secretary
- 2020: David Bernhardt, U.S. Interior Secretary
- 2021: Joe Biden, President of the United States
- 2021: Jill Biden, First Lady of the United States
- 2021: Kamala Harris, Vice President of the United States
- 2022: Merrick Garland, U.S. Attorney General
- 2023: Doug Emhoff, Second Gentleman of the United States
- 2024: Alejandro Mayorkas, Homeland Security Secretary

== See also ==
- World's Largest Menorah
