= Hanukkah menorah =

Ritual candelabrum lit during Jewish holiday of Hanukkah

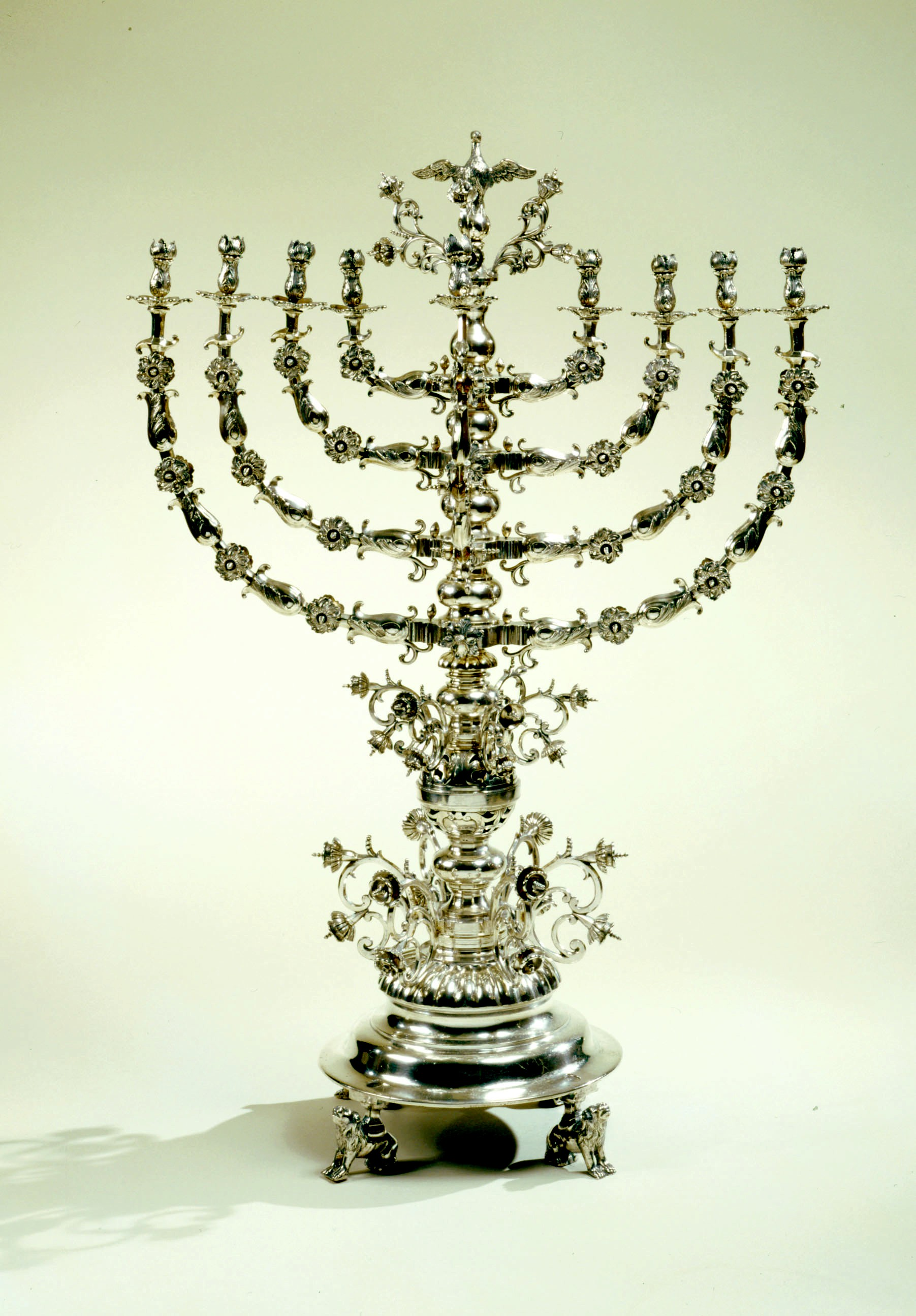
A Hanukkah lamp from Lemberg in The Jewish Museum of New York

A Hanukkah menorah, also called hanukkiah/chanukkiyah or khanuke lomp (Note: (Hebrew: מנורת חנוכה, romanized: menorat ḥanukkah, plural menorot); Hebrew: חַנֻכִּיָּה, romanized: ḥanukkiyah/chanukkiyah (plural. ḥanukkiyot/chanukkiyot); Yiddish: חנוכּה לאָמפּ, romanized: khanuke lomp, lit. 'Hanukkah lamp')) is a nine-branched candelabrum lit during the eight-day Jewish holiday of Hanukkah. Eight of the nine branches hold lights (candles or oil lamps) that symbolize the eight nights of the holiday. On each night, one more light is lit than the previous night, until on the final night all eight branches are ignited. The ninth branch holds a candle, called the shamash ("helper" or "servant"), which is used to light the other eight.

The Hanukkah menorah commemorates, but is distinct from, the seven-branched menorah used in the ancient Temple in Jerusalem. Along with the seven-branched menorah and the Star of David, it is among the most widely produced articles of Jewish ceremonial art.

== Hanukkah story ==
In 167 BCE, a Jewish resistance movement called the Maccabees formed in response to Syrian attempts to assimilate Jewish culture. The Maccabees successfully pushed back the Syrian forces twice despite significant differences in manpower. The Book of Maccabees make no mention of lamp oil or anything resembling modern menorah traditions. This aspect came from the Talmud several centuries later, conflating the eight days of Hanukkah with lamp oil burning for eight days. It states that when the Maccabees liberated Jerusalem temples, the golden temple menorah had already been looted, forcing them to use one of a cheaper metal. When they attempted to light it, they found they did not have enough oil and were only able to use a single day's worth of oil, which nonetheless lasted eight days.

== Construction ==
The shamash must be offset on a higher or lower plane than the main eight candles or oil lamps, but there are differing opinions as to whether all the lights must be arranged in a straight line, or if the hanukkiah can be arranged in a curve. The bottom lamps must be even leveled. Unlike Temple menorahs, Hanukkah menorahs can make use of any material, so long as it's fire safe.

As Chabad Lubavitcher Rebbe Menachem Mendel Schneerson claimed in 1982 that a 12th-century drawing by Maimonides proved that menorahs were supposed to have straight branches pointing upwards diagonally, Chabad-style menorahs are of this design, rather than using the rounded branches more commonly associated with menorahs. Contemporary depictions from the Second Temple period, however, show the menorah with rounded arms. Thus, critics argue that Maimonidides' design was meant to be schematic rather than pictorial.

== Public displays ==
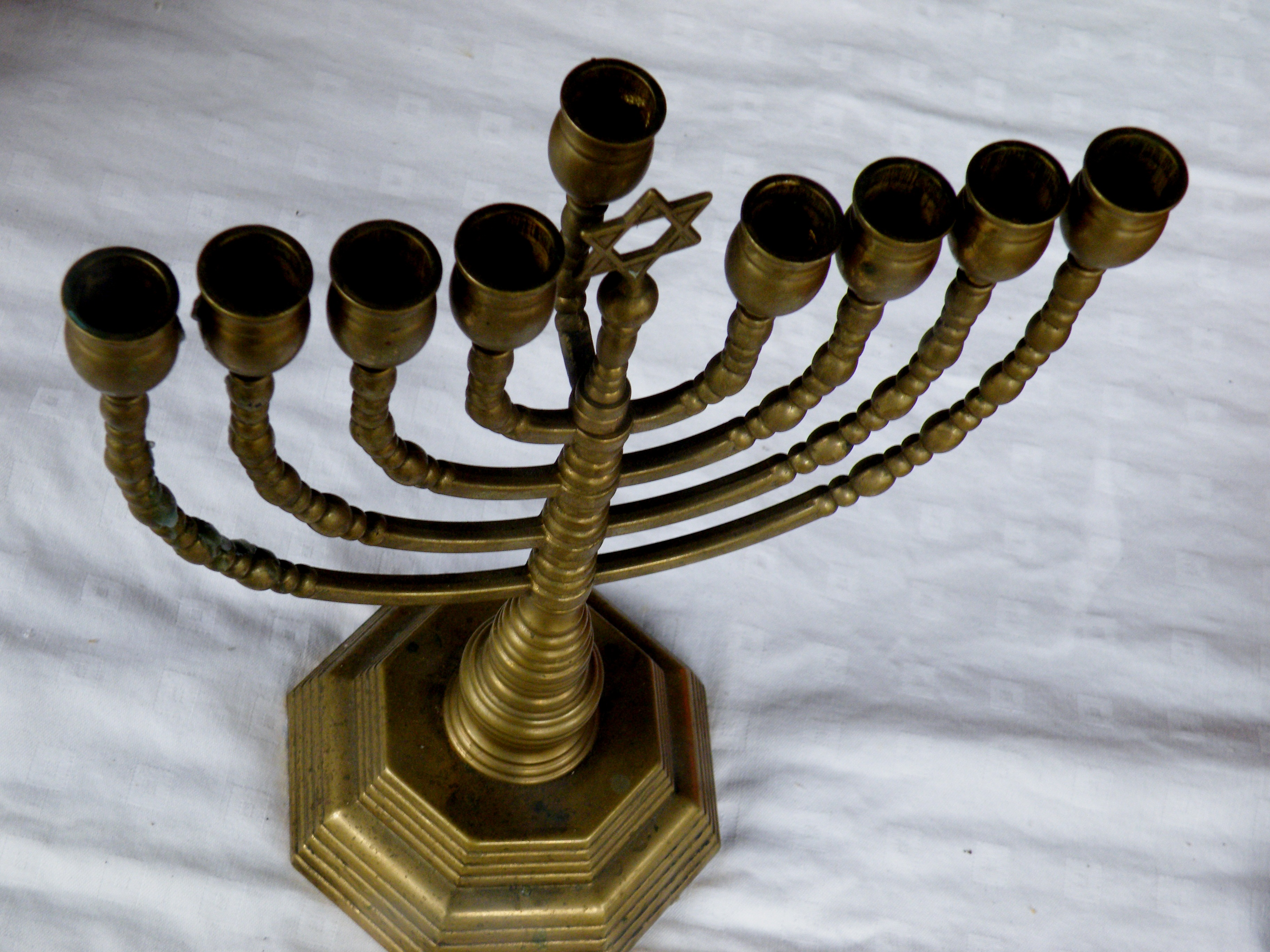
A hanukkiah with a Star of David

The hanukkiah is often displayed in public around Hanukkah time in December. Elected officials often participate in publicly lighting the hanukkiah. The Chabad-Lubavitch movement is well associated with public lighting ceremonies, which it has done since a directive from their last Rebbe, Menachem Mendel Schneerson, in 1987. In the book A Kosher Christmas: 'Tis the Season to Be Jewish, author Rabbi Joshua Plaut, Ph.D., details the history of public displays of the hanukkiah across the United States, summarizes the court cases associated with this issue, and explains how Presidents of the United States came to embrace lighting the hanukkiah during Hanukkah.

In the US, the White House has been represented at the lighting of the National Menorah since 1979. This celebration of Hanukkah began with the attendance of President Jimmy Carter in the ceremony in Lafayette Park. Additionally, beginning with President Bill Clinton in 1993, a hanukkiah is lit at the White House, and in 2001, President George W. Bush began the annual tradition of a White House Hanukkah Party in the White House residence, which includes a hanukkiah candle lighting ceremony.

In the United Kingdom, the House of Commons holds a yearly hanukkiah lighting at the official residence of the Speaker of the House of Commons in the Palace of Westminster. Although John Bercow became the first Jewish Speaker of the House in 2009, the hanukkiah currently used every year had actually been commissioned in 2003 by his predecessor Michael Martin, who was a Catholic; prior to this, a hannukiah had to be borrowed for the ceremony every year.

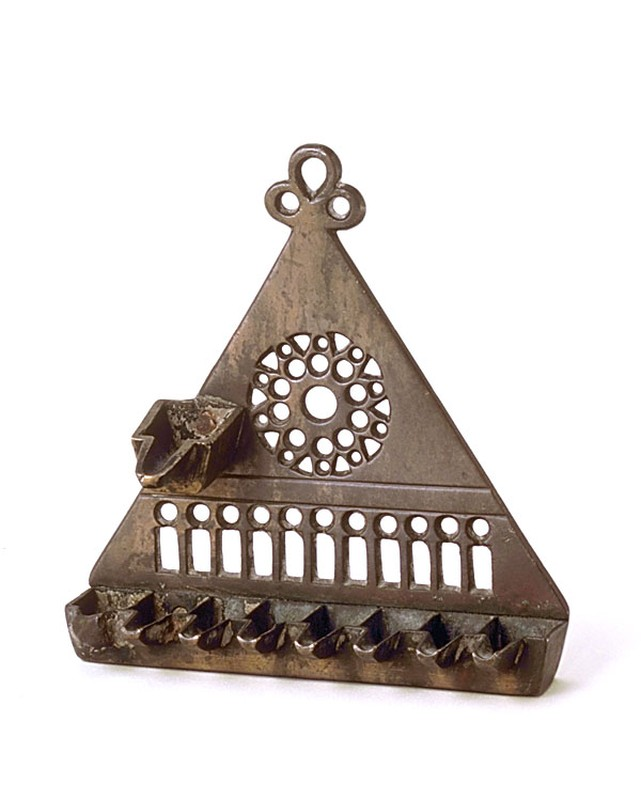
A 14th-century Hanukkah lamp at the Musée d'Art et d'Histoire du Judaïsme

Two large hanukkiahs are in New York City, each standing at 32 feet. One is at Grand Army Plaza in Brooklyn, and the other is at Fifth Avenue and 59th Street in Manhattan near Central Park. A 4,000 lb (1,800 kg) structure, it is the work of Israeli artist Yaacov Agam. Because of the hanukkiah's height, Con Edison assists the lighting by using a crane to lift each person to the top.

In the United States, the public display of hanukkiahs and Christmas trees on public grounds has been the source of legal battles. Specifically, in the 1989 County of Allegheny v. ACLU case, the majority of the U.S. Supreme Court ruled that the public display of hanukkiahs and Christmas trees did not violate the Establishment Clause because the two symbols were not endorsements of the Jewish or Christian faith, and were rather part of the same winter holiday season, which the court found had attained a secular status in US society.

In December 2024 in Kyiv, Ukraine, chief of the Main Directorate of Intelligence of Ukraine Kyrylo Budanov ceremonially lit the first candle on a hanukkiah made from fragments of Russian drones and rockets fired at Ukraine.

=== Public collections ===
Many museums have notable collections of hanukkiahs, including the Israel Museum in Jerusalem, the Metropolitan Museum of Art in New York City, and the Jewish Museum in London (which owns the Lindo lamp).

There is a collection in the small Jewish Museum in Rio de Janeiro.

== Name ==
English speakers most commonly call the lamp a "menorah" or "Hanukkah menorah" (the Hebrew word menorah simply meaning "lamp"). In Modern Hebrew, the lamp is generally called a chanukkiyah, a term which originated among Judeo-Spanish speaking Sephardic communities in the Eastern Mediterranean in the 18th century. It was introduced into Modern Hebrew by Hemda Ben-Yehuda, whose husband Eliezer Ben Yehuda was the leading force behind the revival of the Hebrew language in the late 19th century.

== Adaptations ==
More offbeat Hanukkah products on the American market include a "Menorah Tree" inspired by the Christmas tree tradition, and even a "Menorah Bong". The "Thanksgivukkah" coincidence of Thanksgiving and the second night of Hanukkah in 2013 inspired a turkey-shaped "menurkey".

On December 10, 1997, the Internet's first widely celebrated Interactive Menorah was the premiere greeting for the New York Times 'Cyberseason's Greetings' section of their website. This digital Menorah allowed users to celebrate the holiday from anywhere, lighting candles with a mouse click. The miracle of the oil was honored as the digital Menorah used a minuscule file size of 19kb. The digital Menorah was created by recognized digital artist Bruce Keffer, using the then-new Flash animation software.

== Gallery ==
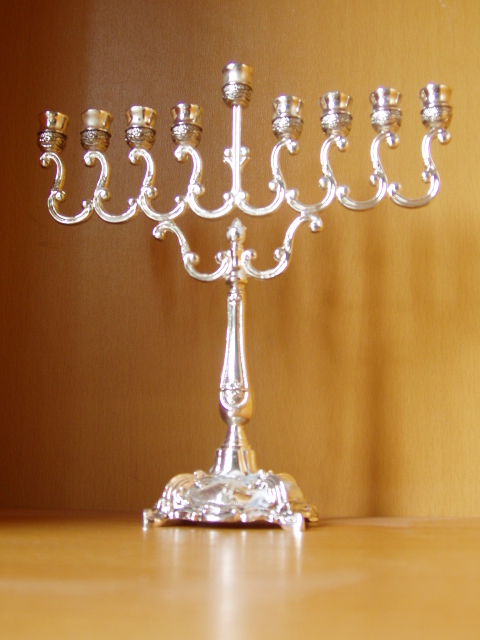
A silver hanukkiah

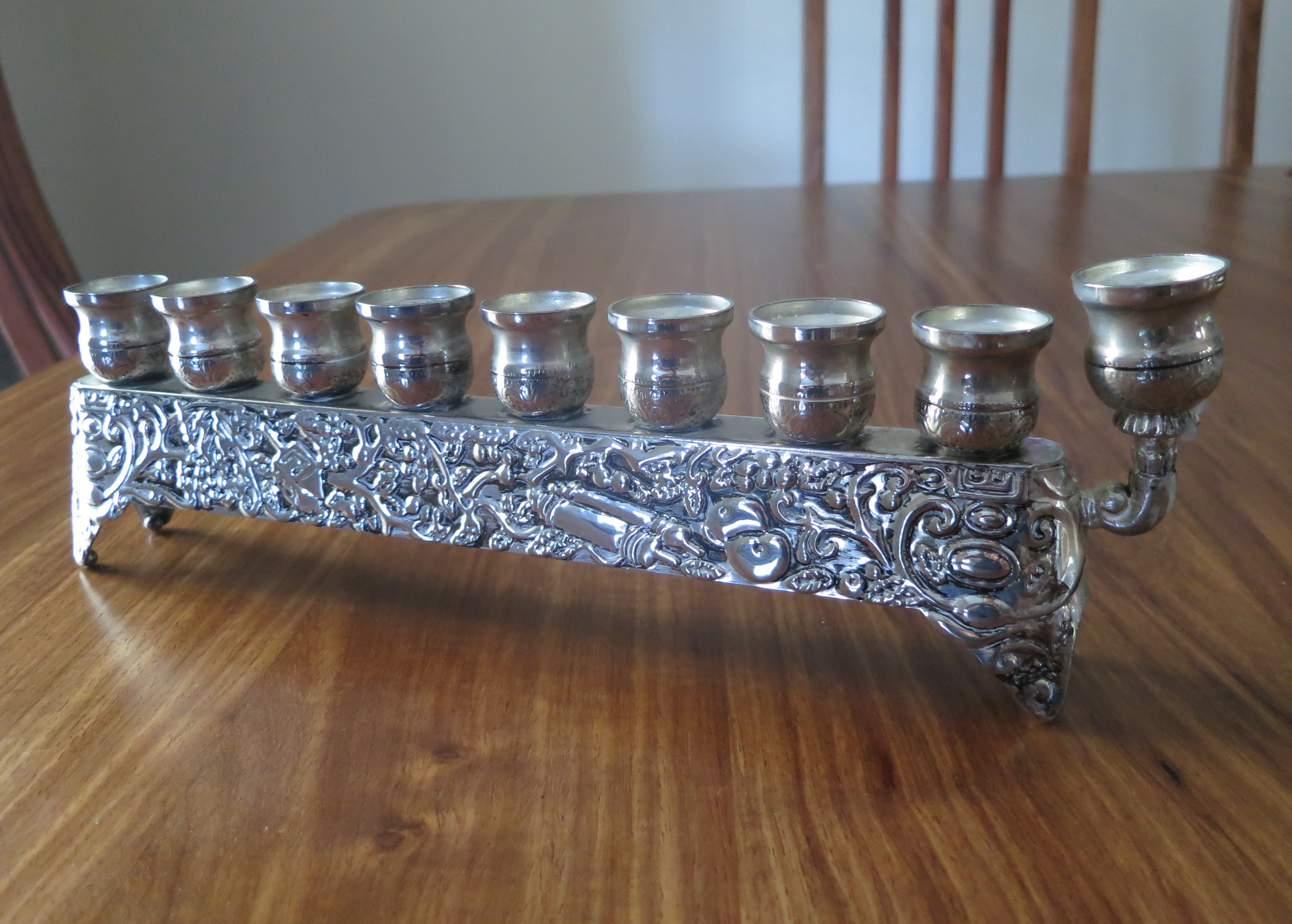
A North Macedonian silver hanukkiah

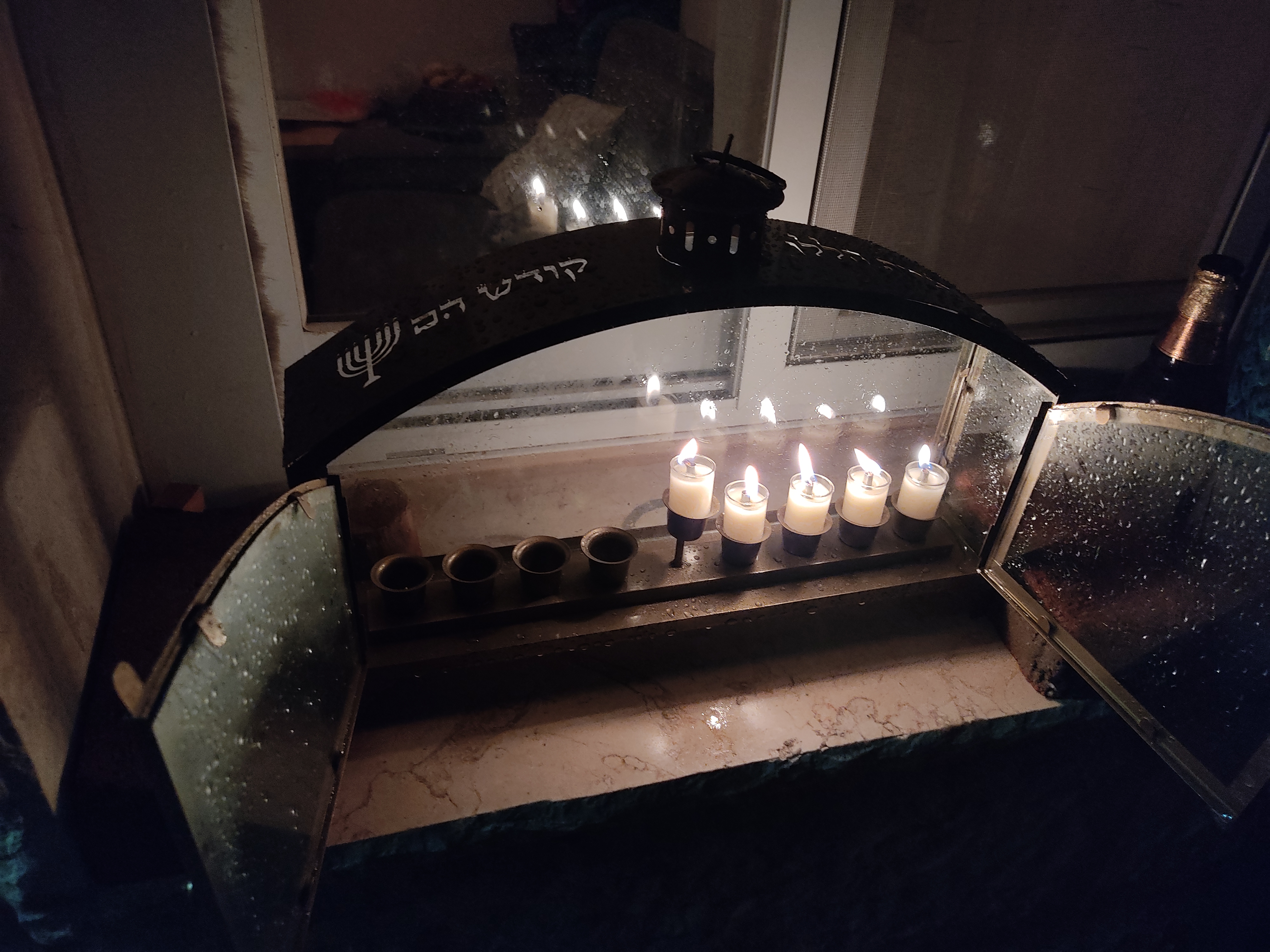
Hanukkiah next to the window

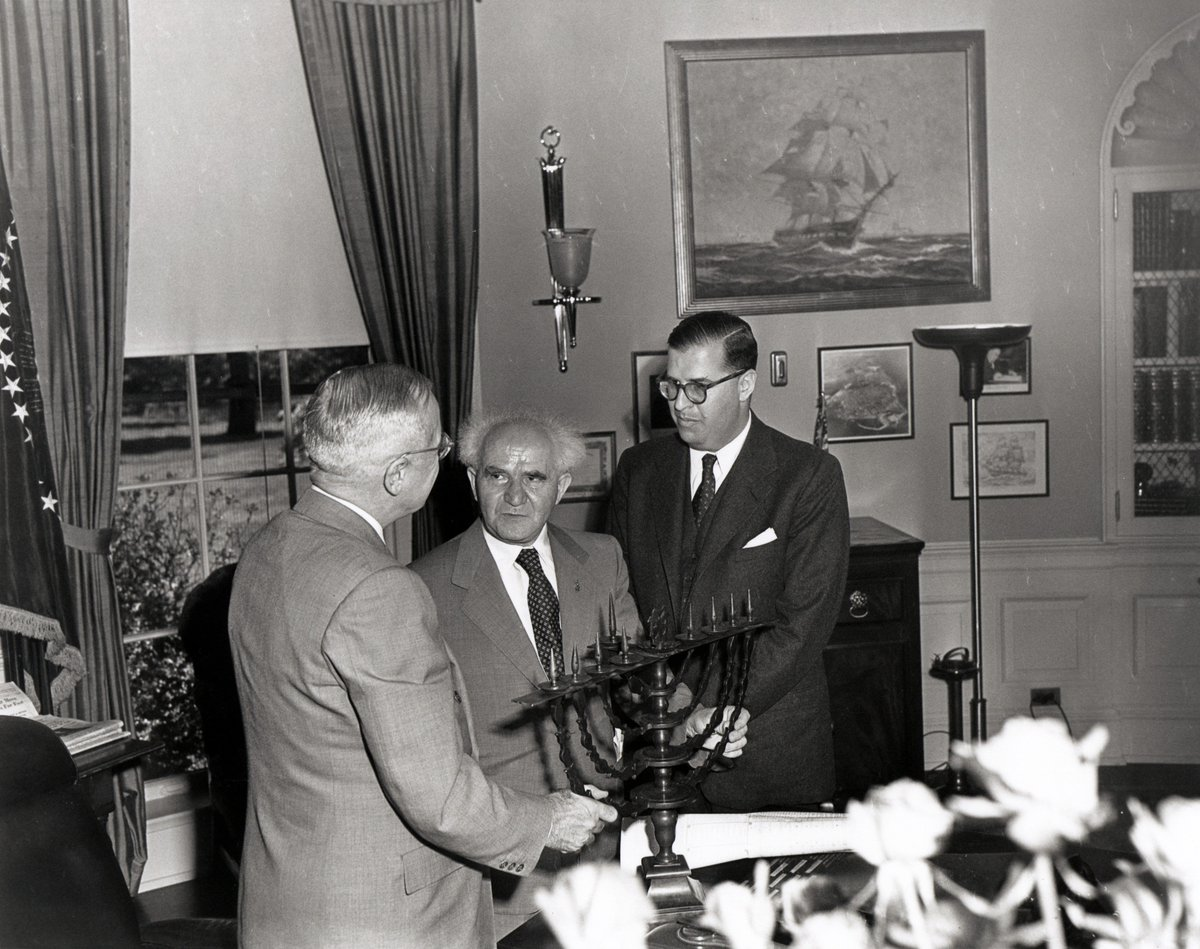
U.S. President Harry S. Truman (left) receiving a hanukkiah in the Oval Office as a gift from Israeli Prime Minister David Ben-Gurion (center) alongside Israel's Ambassador to the U.S. Abba Eban (right), 1951

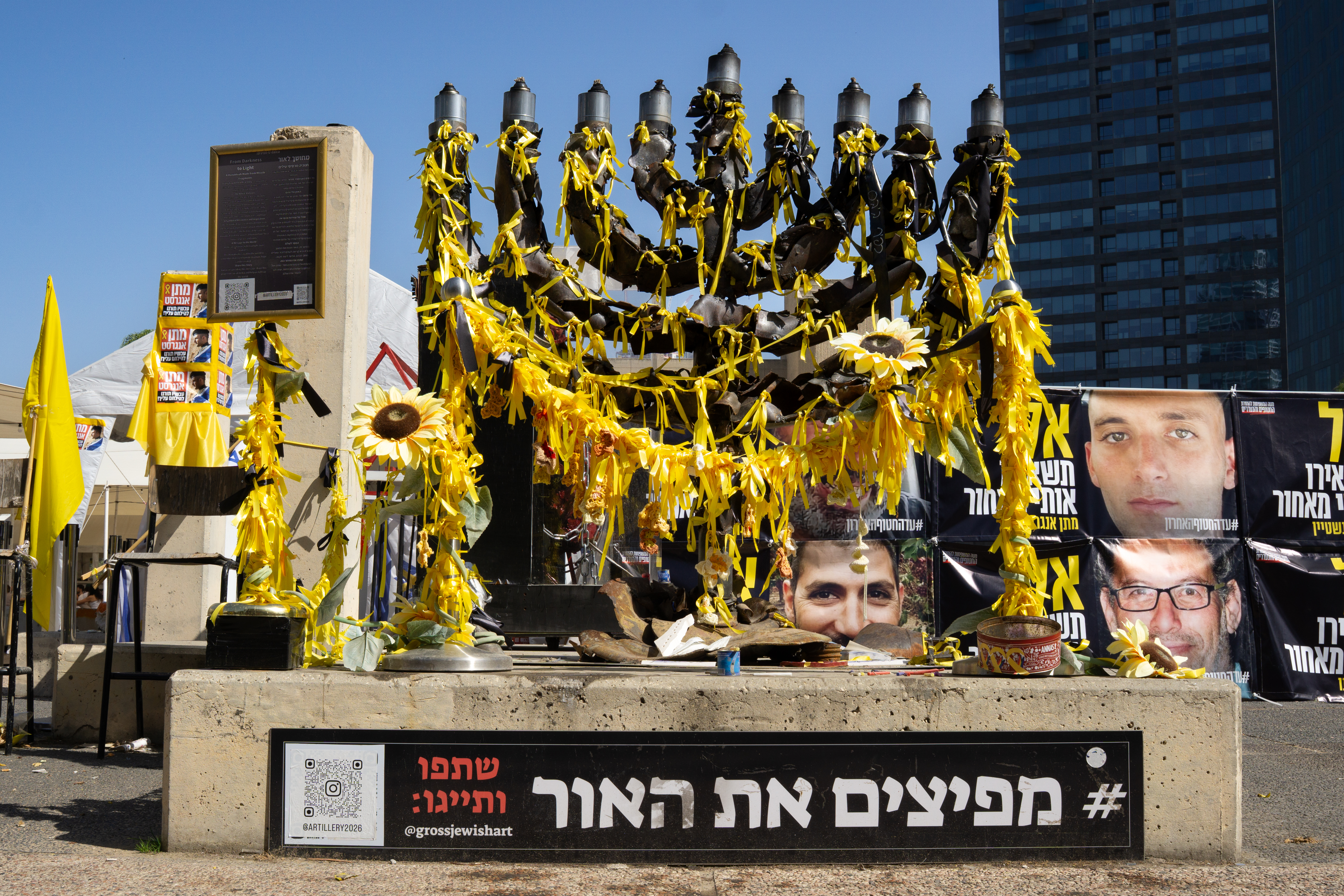
Hanukkiah of Hope in Hostages Square Tel Aviv

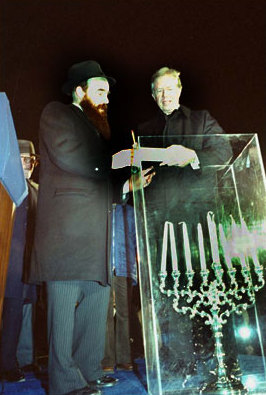
U.S. President Jimmy Carter (right) lighting a hanukkiah with rabbi Abraham Shemtov (left) in Lafayette Park, 1979

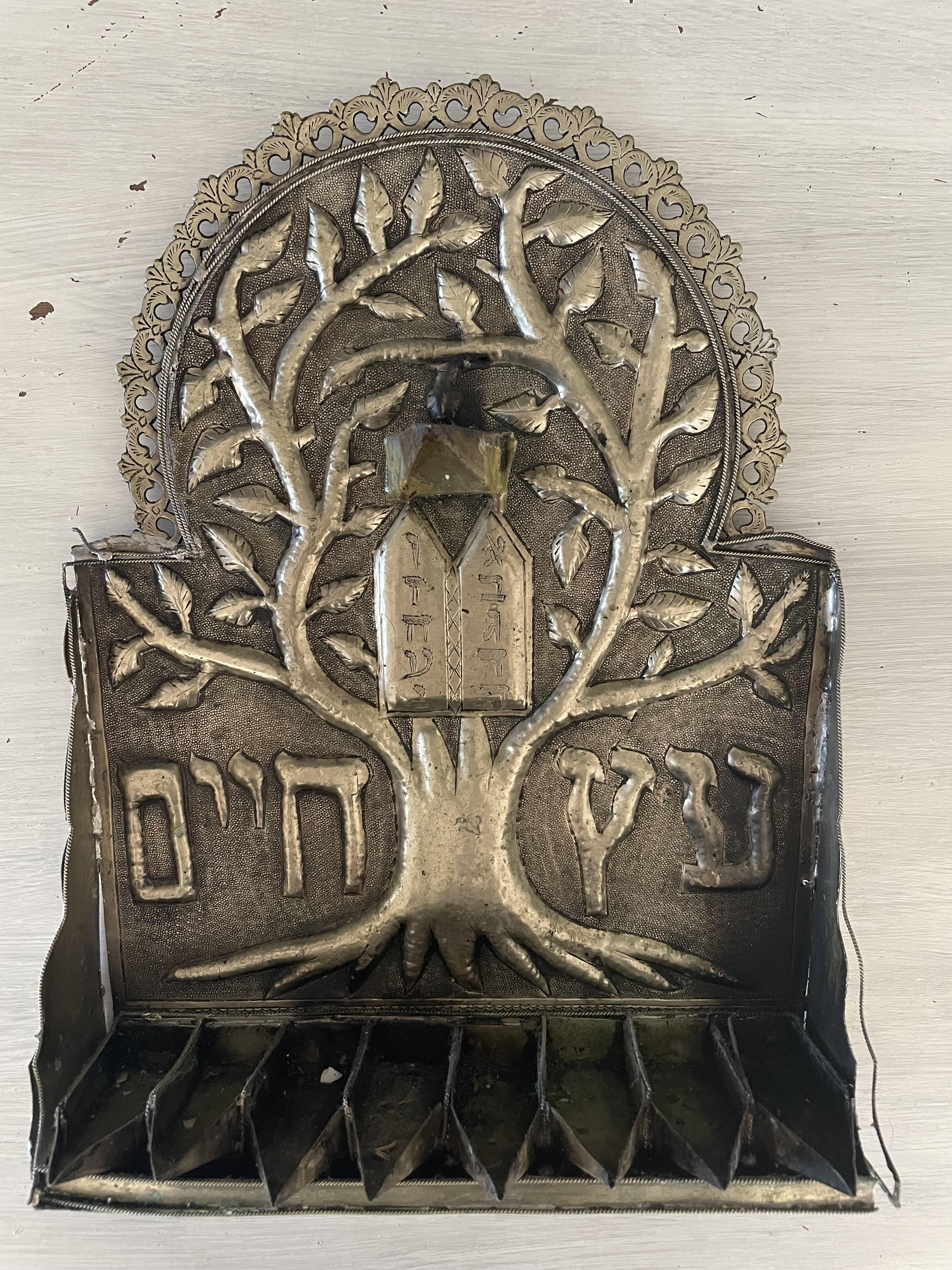
Moroccan hanukkiah with Tree of Life (Etz Chaim) motif

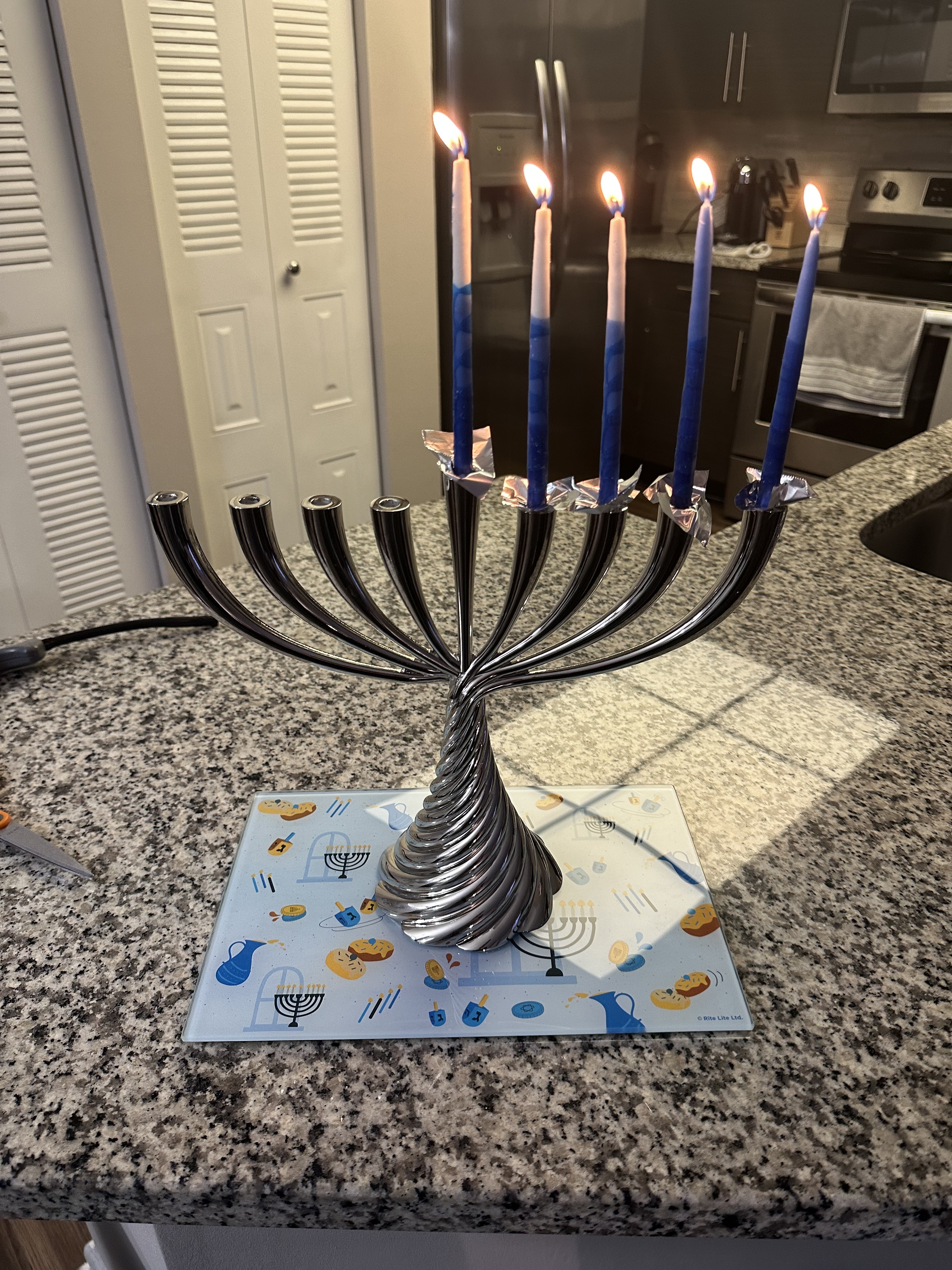
A modern, nickelplate Hanukkah menorah with 5 candles lit
