= Levi Shemtov =

American rabbi

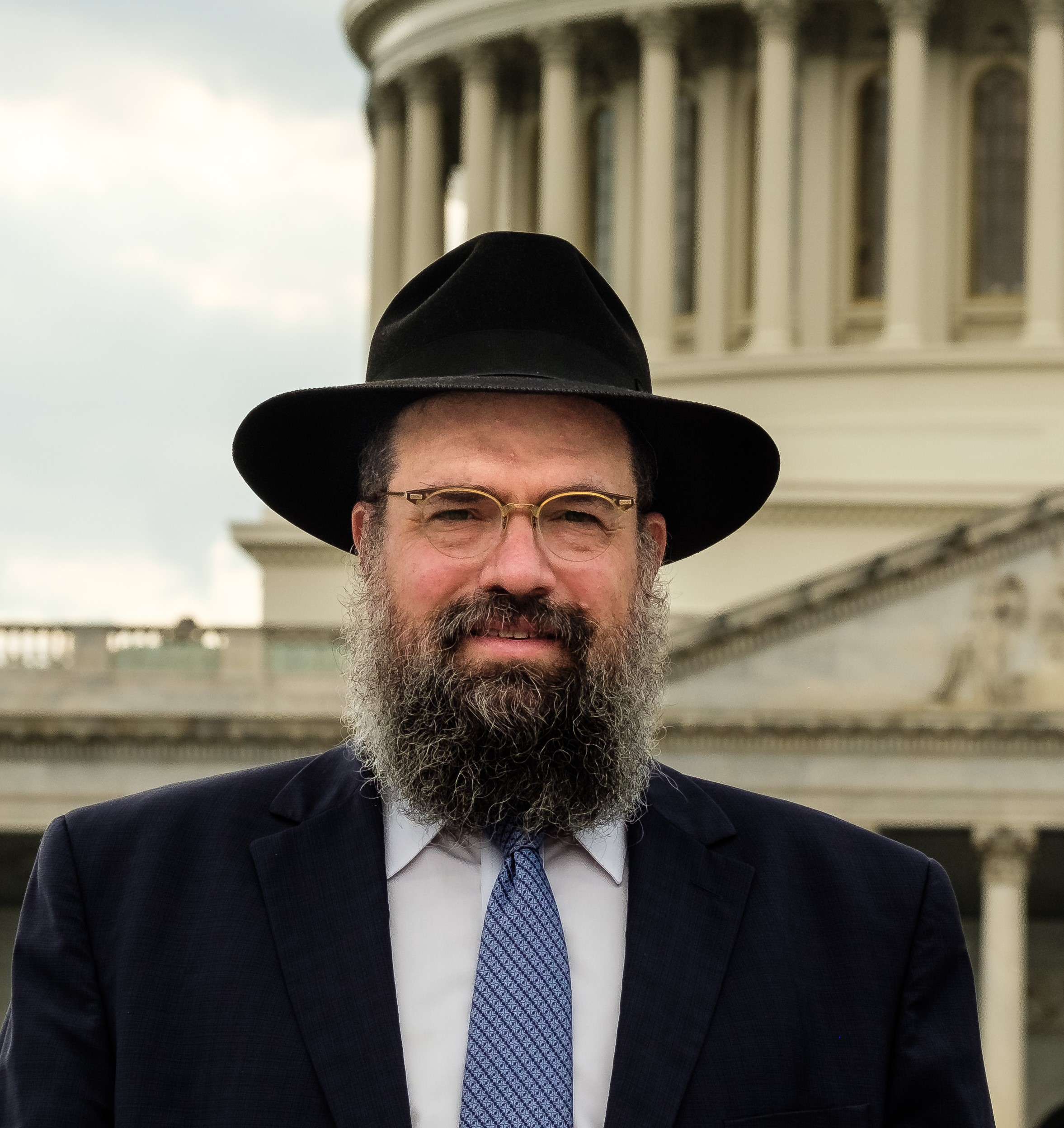
Rabbi Levi Shemtov

Rabbi Levi Shemtov is an American rabbi who is the executive vice president of American Friends of Lubavitch (Chabad). He serves the Jewish community of Washington, D.C., as well as the daily governmental and diplomatic needs of the international Chabad-Lubavitch movement.

Supporters have characterized him as "the rabbi of Capitol Hill", "a Washington institution", "one of the most unlikely players in the nation's capital", "a fixture on the diplomatic circuit", and "one of the most savvy politicos in town".

Rabbi Shemtov is the organizer and director of The National Menorah Lighting on the White House Ellipse. Known as the premiere annual Hanukkah celebration, The National Menorah was established by Rabbi Abraham Shemtov in 1979 and has since been attended by then-president Jimmy Carter, Joe Biden, and annually attended by members of the current administration. The National Menorah is annually attended by thousands and viewed by over 70 million.

Shemtov is the founder and spiritual leader of TheSHUL of the Nation's Capital, an orthodox synagogue located at the Chabad-Lubavitch Center in Washington, DC. TheSHUL offers a place for worship and community, regardless of formal affiliation – and offers children's programs, Torah study opportunities, and engaging celebrations of Shabbat and Jewish holidays.

Shemtov chairs the organizing committee of the International Chabad-Lubavitch Conference – Living Legacy. He is a member of the Vaad Harabanim of Greater Washington, a group of Orthodox rabbis in the Greater Washington area.

== National programs ==
Shemtov founded and directs the Capitol Jewish Forum, which is the largest apolitical Jewish group on Capitol Hill, designed to "create and enhance a sense of identity and community among Jewish Congressional staffers and members of Congress" and which enjoys strong support of the Leadership and members of both parties in the US Senate and House of Representatives since its founding. Some sources attest to Shemtov’s frequent appearance at the White House, Pentagon, State Department and other venues in Washington. He directed and has been involved in many Jewish community and other events with the White House, including overseeing the koshering process of the White House kitchens for the celebration of Jewish American Heritage Month and Chanukah, during the administrations of George W. Bush, Barack Obama, Donald Trump, and Joe Biden.
