= TriBeCa Synagogue =

Orthodox synagogue in Manhattan, New York

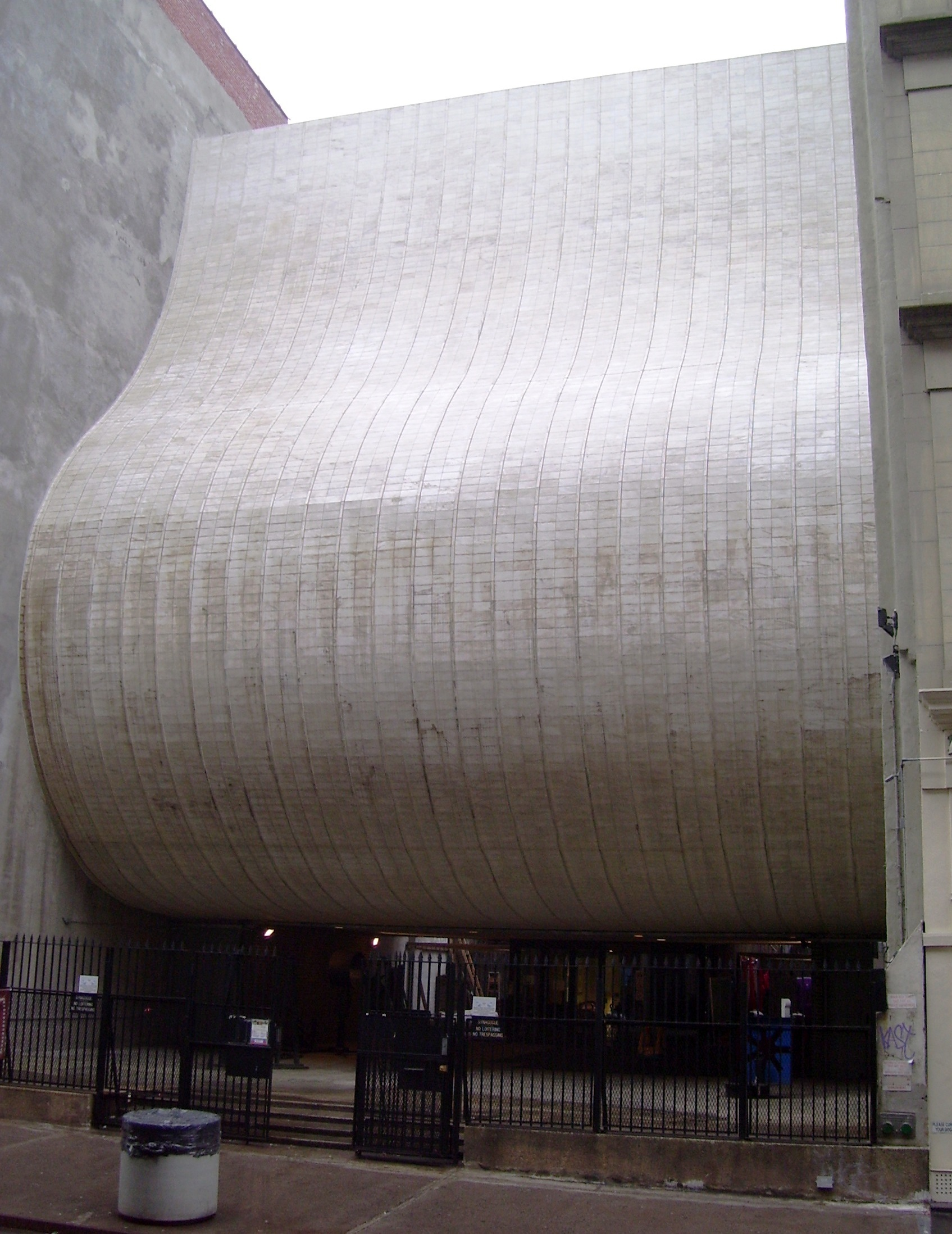
- The synagogue façade, in 2012

- Location in Lower Manhattan

Religion
- Affiliation: Orthodox Judaism
- Ecclesiastical or organisational status: Synagogue
- Leadership: Rabbi Jonathan Glass
- Status: Active

Location
- Location: 49 White Street, Tribeca, Manhattan, New York City, New York 10013
- Country: United States
- Coordinates: 40°43′06″N 74°00′15″W

Architecture
- Architect: William N. Breger
- Type: Synagogue architecture
- Style: Modernist architecture
- Established: 1938 (as the Civic Center Synagogue)
- Completed: 1967

Website
- tribecasynagogue.org

TriBeCa Synagogue (also known as Synagogue for the Arts and Civic Center Synagogue) is an Orthodox Jewish congregation and synagogue, located at 49 White Street, in Tribeca, Manhattan, New York City, New York, United States. It is part of the landmarked Tribeca East Historic District.

Designed by architect William N. Breger in 1967, the Modernist synagogue is known for its unique acoustics that allow for good sound quality without the need for electrical amplification, use of which is prohibited on Shabbat.

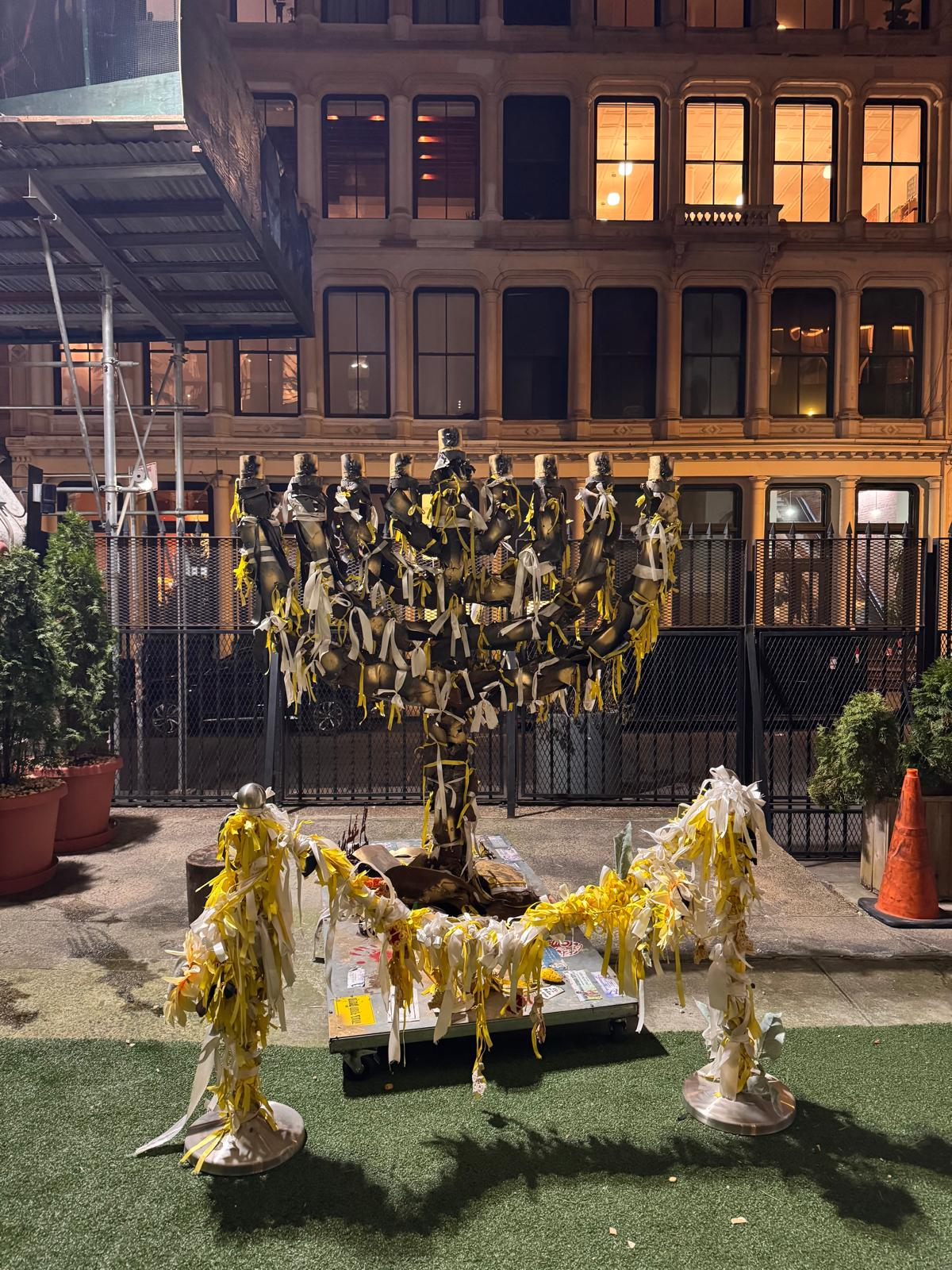
The Menorah of Hope outside the TriBeCa Synagogue in Manhattan, Hanukkah 5786 (2025)

== Notable members ==
- Julian E. Zelizer
- Meg Jacobs

Rabbi Jonathan Glass has been the Rabbi since 1989.
