= William N. Breger =

American architect

- Occupation: Architect
- Buildings: TriBeCa Synagogue

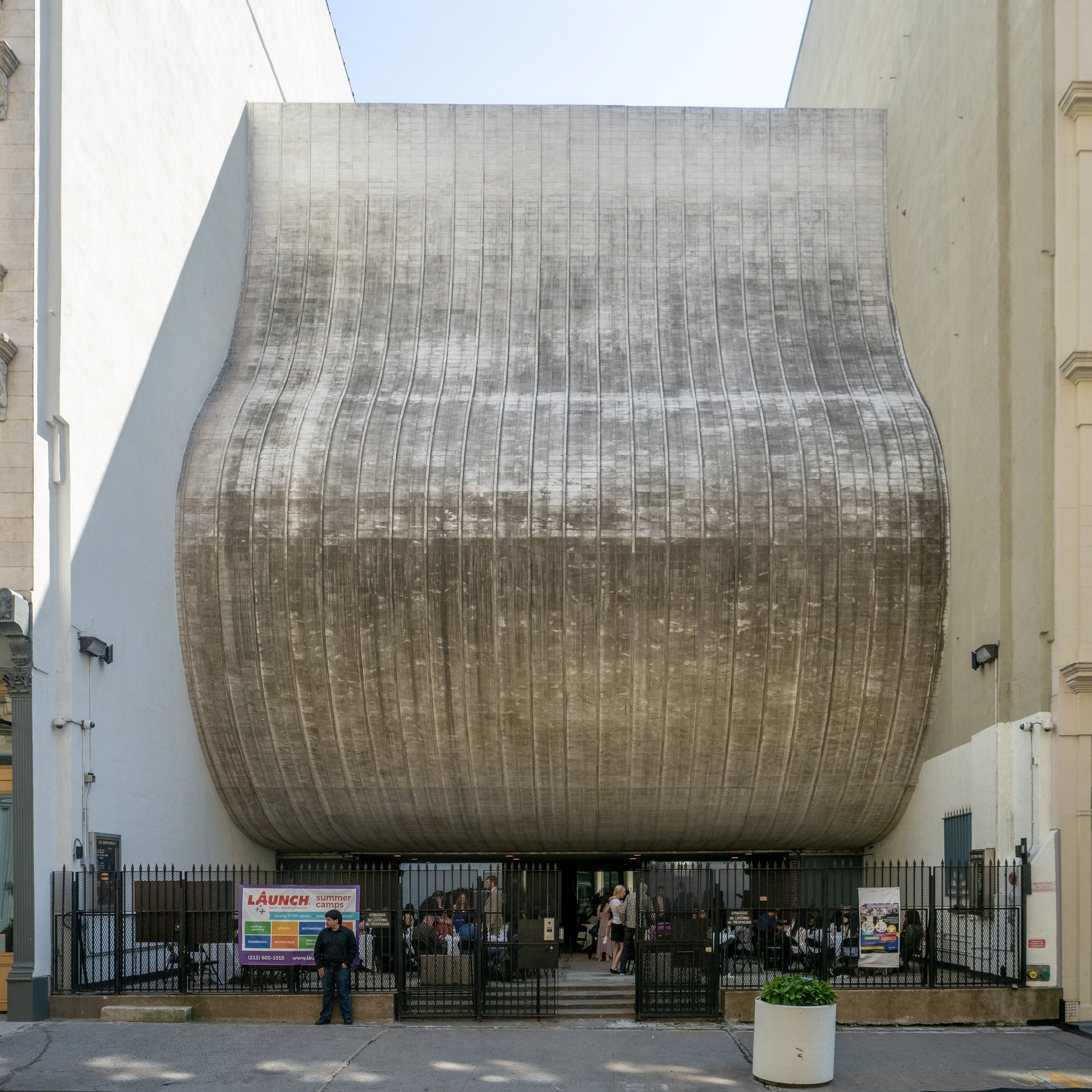
The TriBeCa Synagogue in New York City, designed by Breger and completed in 1967.

William N. Breger (1922 – February 23, 2015) was an American architect, most famously known for designing the TriBeCa Synagogue, in Manhattan, New York City.

== Biography ==
William N. Breger was born in the Bronx, New York City in 1922. He attended Stuyvesant High School, and later held a graduate degree in architecture from Harvard University, and a PhD in philosophy from New York University.

Breger served in the planning department of the US Army during World War II. Following the war, he spent two years working as an assistant and draftsman for Walter Gropius, the founder of the Bauhaus Architecture Movement.

In 1967 Breger designed the modernist TriBeCa Synagogue, in Manhattan, New York City. Known for its unique acoustics that allow good sound quality without the need for electrical amplification, the use of which is prohibited on Shabbat. Breger otherwise specialized in the design of nursing homes.

Breger died on February 23, 2015 in New York City.

== Architectural works ==
- Capri Beach Club, 1233 Beech St, Atlantic Beach, New York (1950, demolished)
- Evan Hunter house, Horseshoe Hill Rd, Pound Ridge, New York (1955)
- Florence Nightingale Nursing Home, 1760 Third Ave, New York City (1964)
- TriBeCa Synagogue, 49 White St, New York City (1965–67)
- Allegheny Square, Allegheny Center, Pittsburgh (1967–69, removed 2012)
- CABS Nursing Home, 270 Nostrand Ave, Brooklyn (1973–75, demolished 2019)
- Marcus Garvey Nursing Home, 810 St Marks Ave, Brooklyn (1975–77)
