= The Ellipse =

Park in Washington, D.C., U.S.

- President's Park South
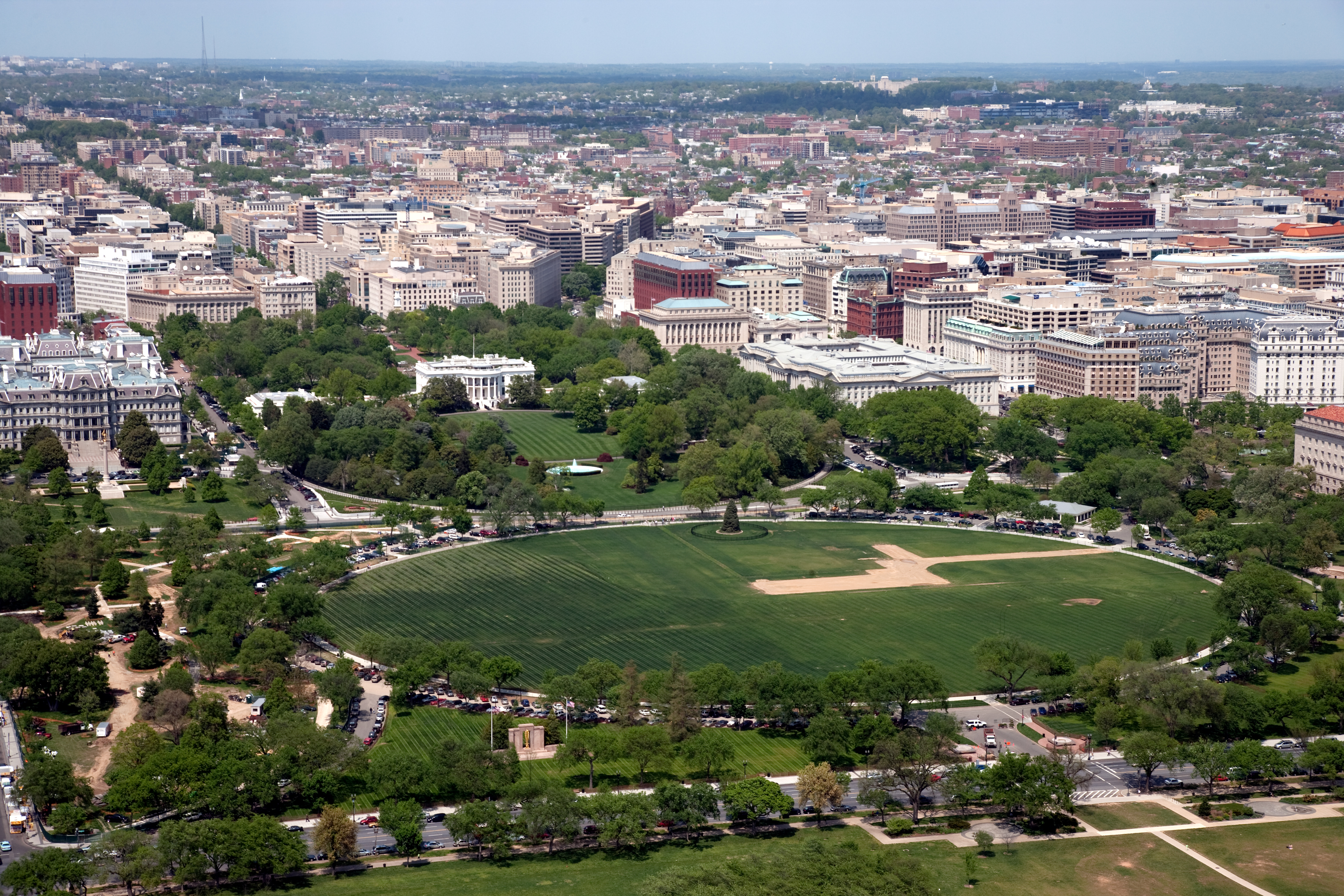
- A 2007 aerial view of the Ellipse with the White House visible among trees in the upper center left
- Interactive map of The Ellipse
- Location: Washington, D.C., United States
- Coordinates: 38.8939°N 77.0366°W
- Area: 52 acres (21 ha)

The Ellipse, sometimes referred to as President's Park South, is a 52-acre (21 ha) park south of the White House fence and north of Constitution Avenue and the National Mall in Washington, D.C., United States. The Ellipse is also the name of the five-furlong (1.0 km) circumference street within the park. The entire park, which features monuments, is open to the public and is part of President's Park. The Ellipse is the location for many annual events.

From a mathematical point of view, the Ellipse is truly an ellipse. Its dimensions are 1,058 feet (322 m) for its major axis (east-west) and 903 feet (275 m) for its minor axis (north-south). Its foci are 552 feet (168 m) apart, each 276 feet (84 m) from the center of the ellipse (east and west). Its eccentricity is thus 552/1058 = 0.52.

== History ==
=== 18th century ===
In 1791, the first plan for the park was drawn up by Pierre Charles L'Enfant. The Ellipse was known as "the White Lot" due to the whitewashed wooden fence that enclosed the park.

=== 19th century ===
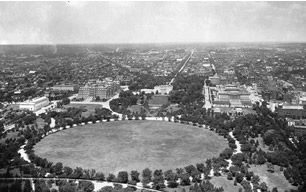
The Ellipse in the early 1900s

During the American Civil War, the grounds of the Ellipse and the incomplete Washington Monument were used as corrals for horses, mules, and cattle, and as camp sites for Union troops.

In 1860, the Ellipse was the regular playing field for the Washington Senators and was the site of the first game between the Senators and the Washington Nationals. In 1865, the Nationals hosted a baseball tournament with the Philadelphia Athletics, for which viewing stands were built and admission was charged. Black baseball teams such as the Washington Mutuals and the Washington Alerts often used the White Lot until Blacks were banned from using the Ellipse in 1874.

In 1867, the Army Corps of Engineers began work on the Ellipse. The park was landscaped in 1879, and American elms were planted around the existing portion of the roadway. In 1880, grading began and the Ellipse was created from what had been a common dump. In 1894, the Ellipse roadway was lit with electric lamps.

In the 1890s, Congress authorized the use of the Ellipse grounds by special groups, including religious meetings and military encampments. As late as 1990, baseball fields and tennis courts existed in the park. Sporting events and demonstrations are still held on the Ellipse. In 1933, President's Park South came under the jurisdiction of the National Park Service.

=== 20th century ===
On Christmas Eve 1923, President Calvin Coolidge started an unbroken tradition by lighting the first National Christmas Tree. The first tree, a cut balsam fir, was placed on the Ellipse by the District of Columbia Public Schools. From 1924 to 1953, live trees in locations around and on the White House grounds were lit on Christmas Eve. In 1954, the ceremony returned to the Ellipse and with an expanded focus: the "Christmas Pageant of Peace."

From 1954 to 1972, cut trees were used. In 1973, a Colorado blue spruce was planted on the Ellipse. Both the 1973 tree and its 1977 replacement died "due to damage and failure to thrive." In 1978, a replacement tree was planted and lived until it was destroyed by a wind storm on February 19, 2011. The 2011 replacement was destroyed by transplant shock in 2012.

On August 10, 1933, the Ellipse was transferred to the National Park Service, the legal successor of three federal commissioners appointed by the President under the Residence Act, signed on July 16, 1790, which directed initial construction. Their authority developed through acts of May 1, 1802; March 3, 1849; March 2, 1867; July 1, 1898; February 26, 1925; March 3, 1933; and Executive Order of June 10, 1933. Under act of September 22, 1961, "the White House shall be administered pursuant to the act of August 25, 1916 (39 Stat. 535; 39 U.S.C. § 535), and Acts supplementary thereto and amendatory thereof." This NPS area was originally referred to simply as "The White House."

In 1942, during World War II, the National Park Service granted permission for the construction of barracks as a special emergency wartime measure. The temporary barracks were erected on the south side of the Old Executive Office Building and the entire First Division Monument grounds. In 1954, the "White House Barracks" were demolished.

=== 21st century ===
Immediately prior to the January 6 United States Capitol attack, President Donald Trump delivered a speech on the Ellipse to his supporters gathered at a "Save America rally" to challenge the result November 2020 presidential election. The speech was followed by mass violence, with supporters storming the United States Capitol in an attempt to prevent the certification of President-elect Joe Biden as the winner of the election.

On October 29, 2024, in the closing days of the 2024 presidential election campaign, Vice President Kamala Harris held a rally on the Ellipse, delivering a speech to an estimated 75,000 attendees. The choice of the Ellipse as the venue for the speech was thought to be intended to draw contrast between Harris and election rival Donald Trump's rally at the Ellipse prior to the January 6 United States Capitol attack.

== Memorials ==
- Boy Scout Commemorative Tribute by Donald De Lue
- Bulfinch Gatehouses by Charles Bulfinch
- Butt-Millet Memorial Fountain by Daniel Chester French
- Ellipse Meridian Stone, located under the surface near the center of the Ellipse, commemorates President Thomas Jefferson's idea of an American prime meridian.
- Enid Haupt Fountains
- First Division Monument by Daniel Chester French
- National Menorah (seasonal)
- National Christmas Tree
- Original Patentees Memorial, located at 38° 53.646′ N, 77° 2.03′ W (It can be reached from 15th Street Northwest north of Constitution Avenue Northwest (Route 50), on the left when traveling north) to remember the original 18 patentees "prior to 1700 whose land grants embraced the site of the federal city" (which became the District of Columbia) by National Society of the Daughters of the American Colonists
- Second Division Memorial by James Earle Fraser
- Zero Milestone by Horace Peaslee

== Events ==
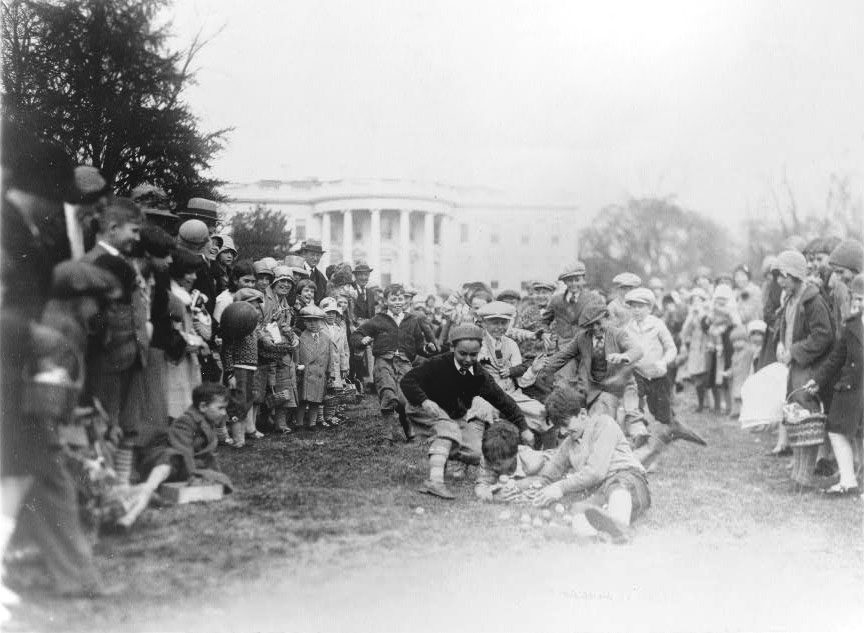
The 1929 White House egg roll

Annual events on the Ellipse include the Christmas Pageant of Peace and formerly the "Twilight Tattoo" military pageant. From 1992 to 2005, it was the site for the commencement ceremony for The George Washington University. It is also the queueing location for the annual White House Easter Egg Roll and the White House garden tours.

Under the auspices of the National Park Service, the Capital Alumni Network and a number of neighborhood and military sports leagues play softball and flag football games on the grounds of the Ellipse. A number of ultimate competitions are held by groups throughout the warmer months.

The Ellipse Visitor Pavilion, opened for visitors in May 1994, distributes free tickets for special events at the White House such as the Easter Egg Roll and the fall and spring Garden Tours. It includes an information window, concession area, restrooms, telephones, water fountains, and a first aid area, all accessible.

The National Menorah, first lit in 1979 and moved to the Ellipse in 1987, is erected by Chabad and lit there annually during Hanukkah. Its 30-foot height reflects the maximum at which the lights are considered readily visible under Jewish law.
