= Hanukkiah of Hope =

Public Hanukkiah made from missile fragments

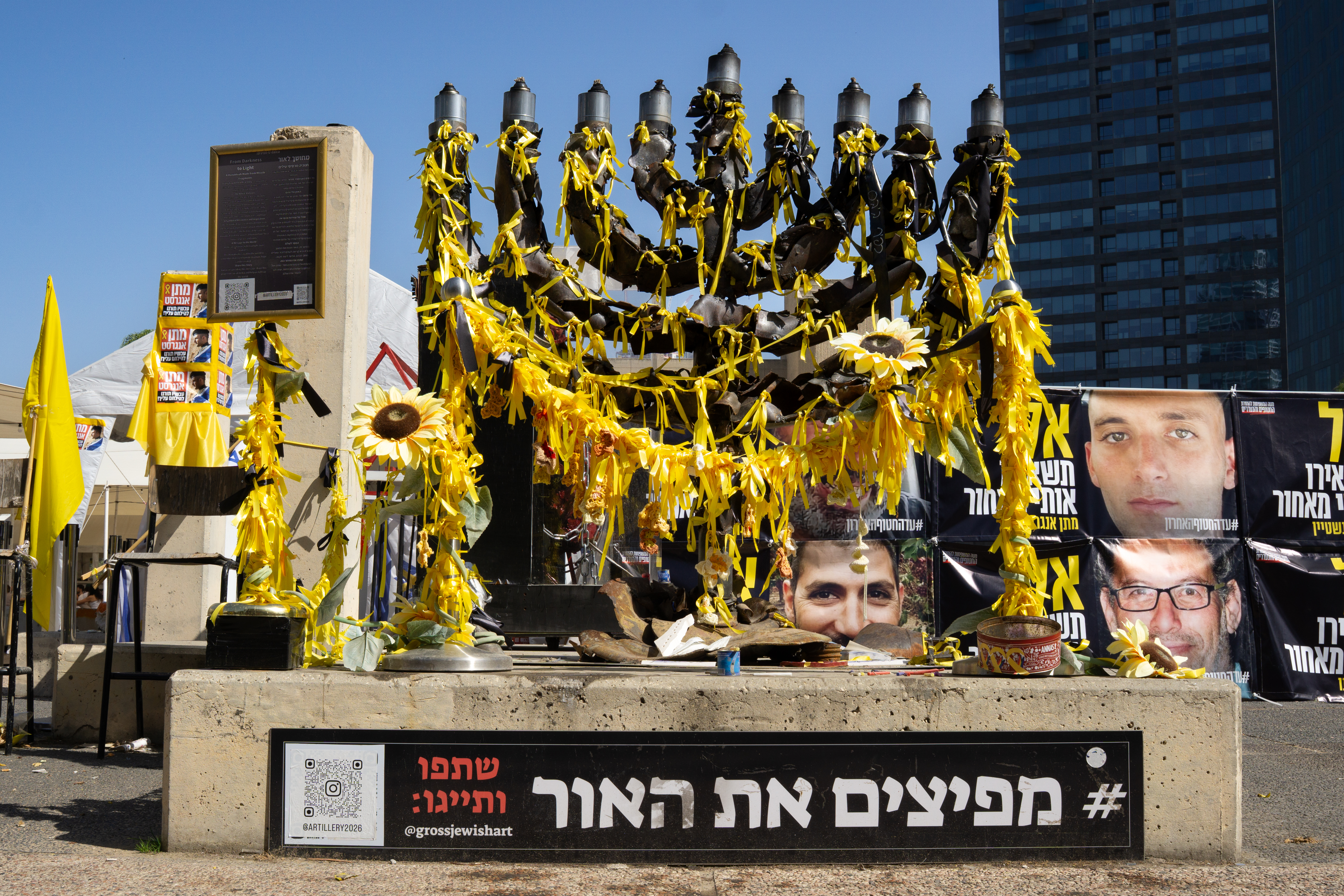
The Hanukkiah of Hope installed in Hostages Square, May 2025.

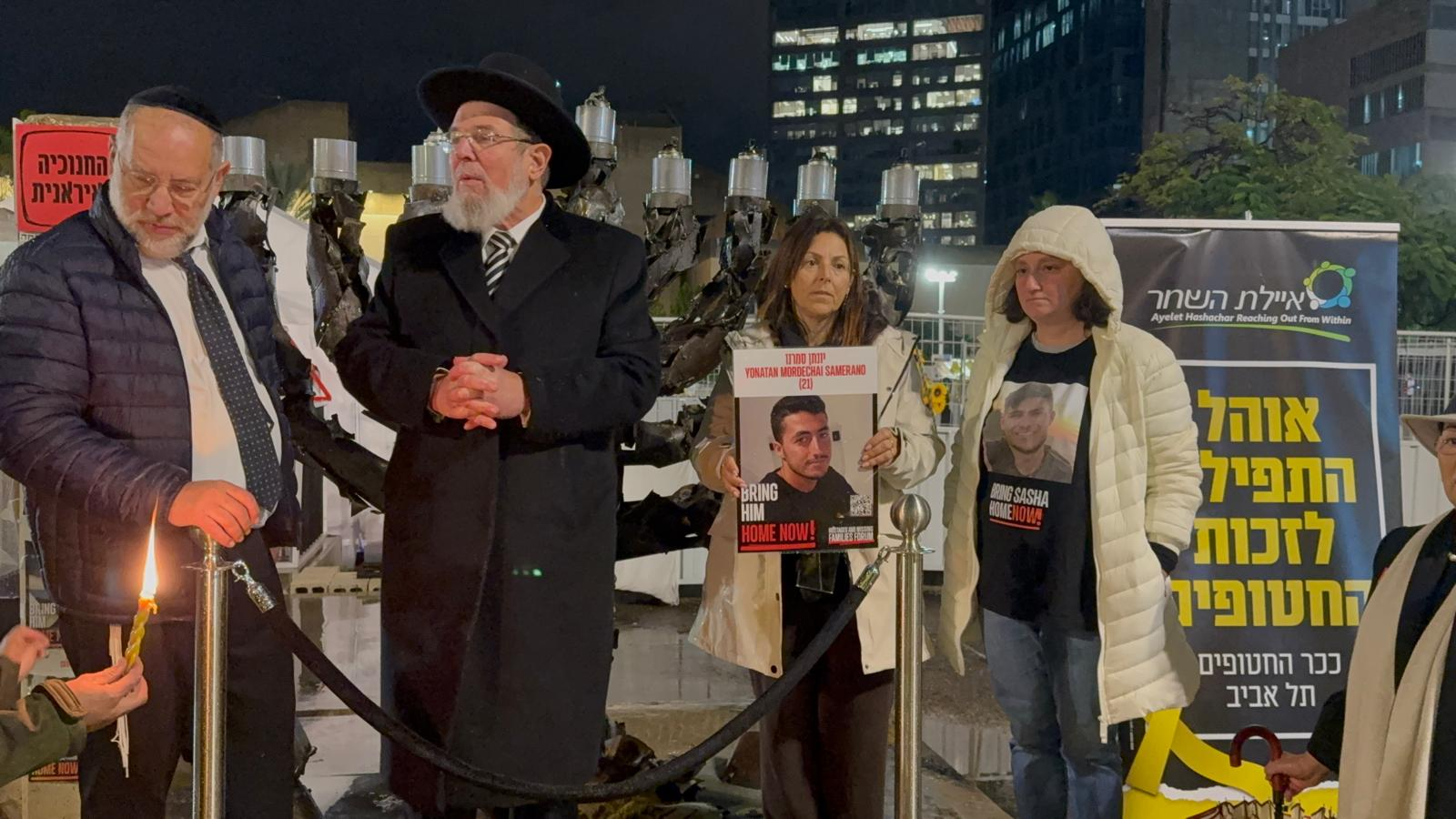
The Chief Rabbi of Israel, Rabbi Kalman Ber, with families of the hostages at the candle lighting.

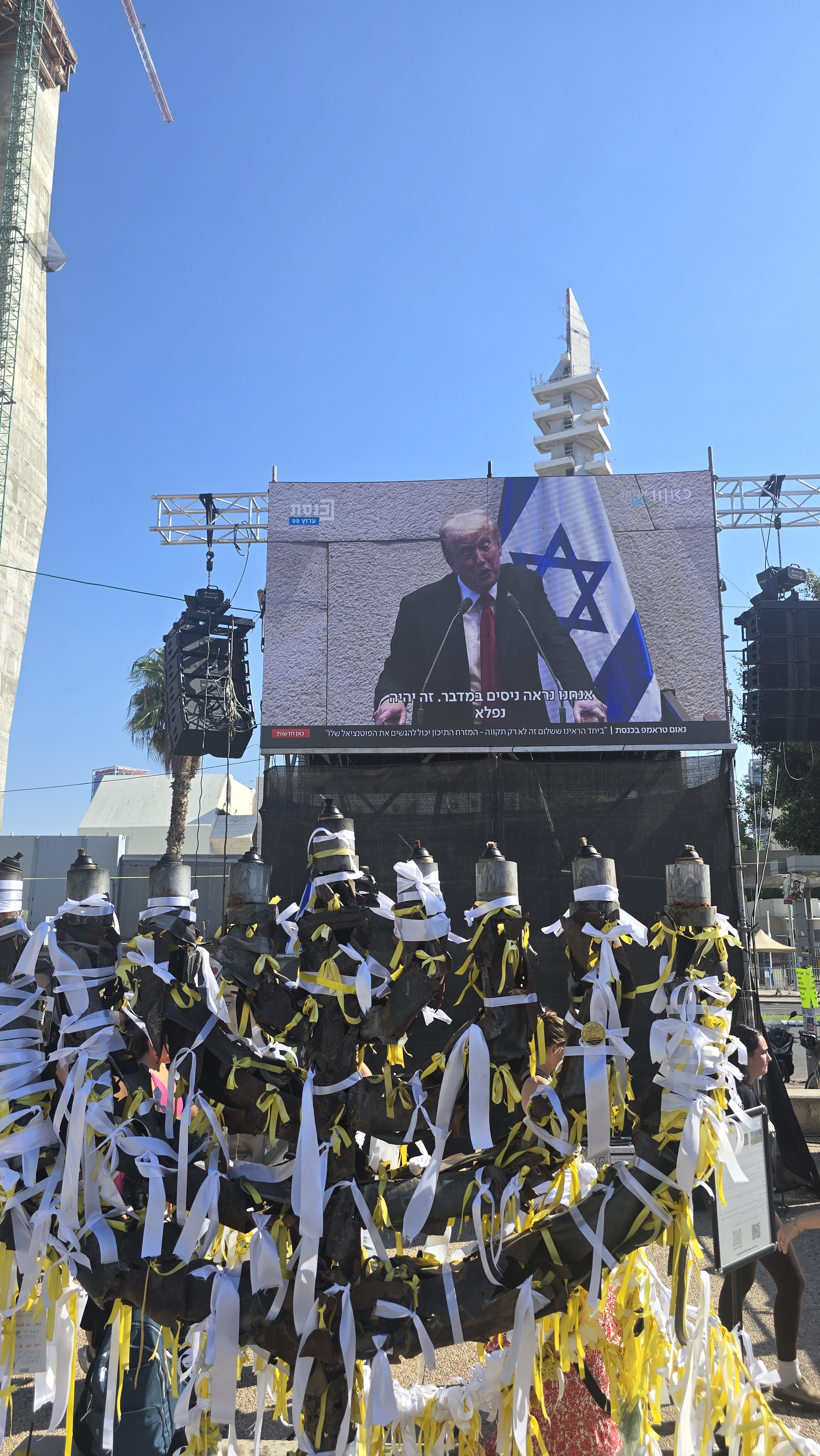
The Hanukkiah of Hope in Hostages Square during Trump’s speech in the Knesset, with the Kirya in the background

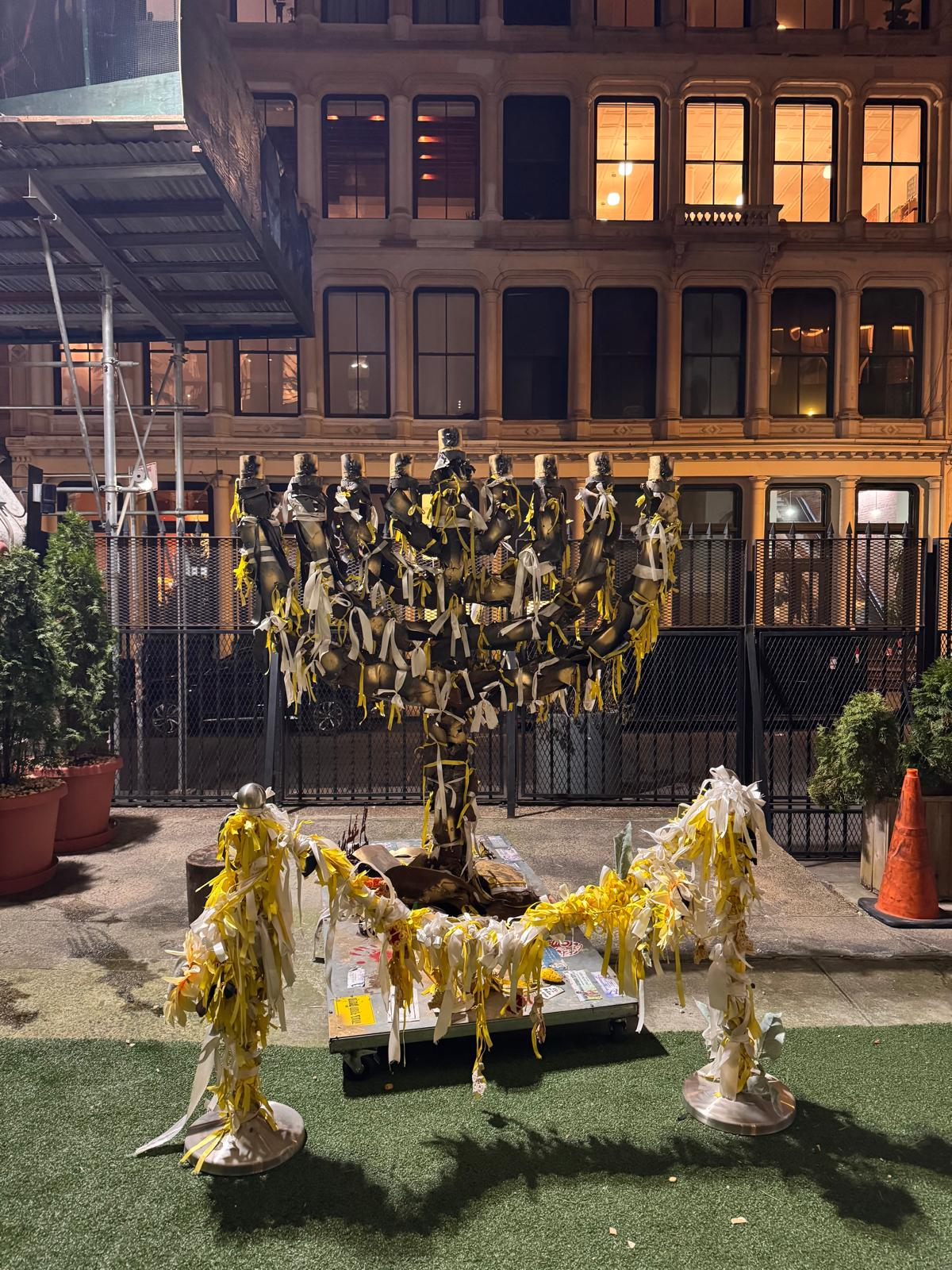
The Hanukkiah of Hope in the courtyard of a synagogue in the heart of Manhattan, December 2025

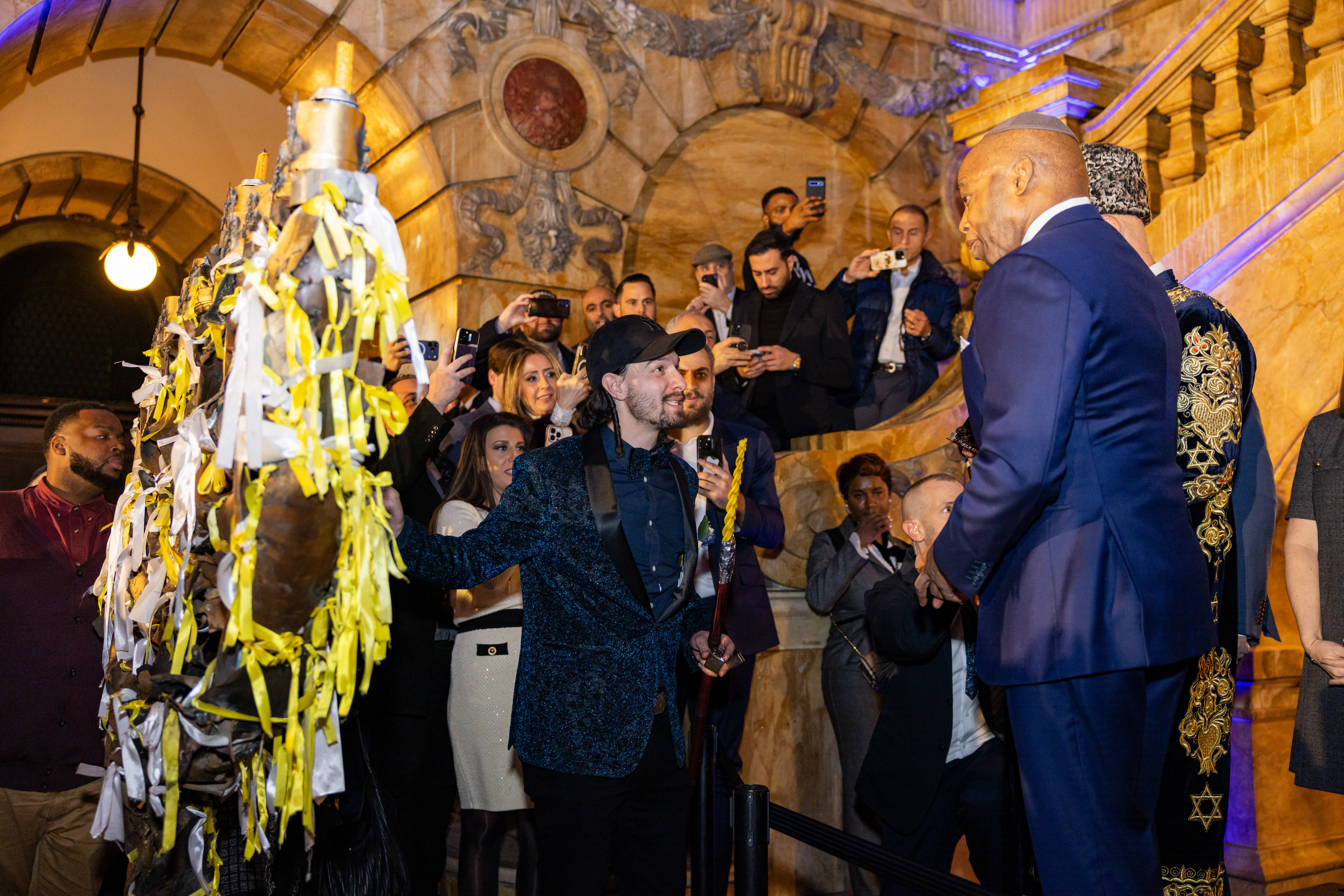
Outgoing New York City Mayor Eric Adams lighting the Hanukkah candles at City Hall together with artist Eli Gross

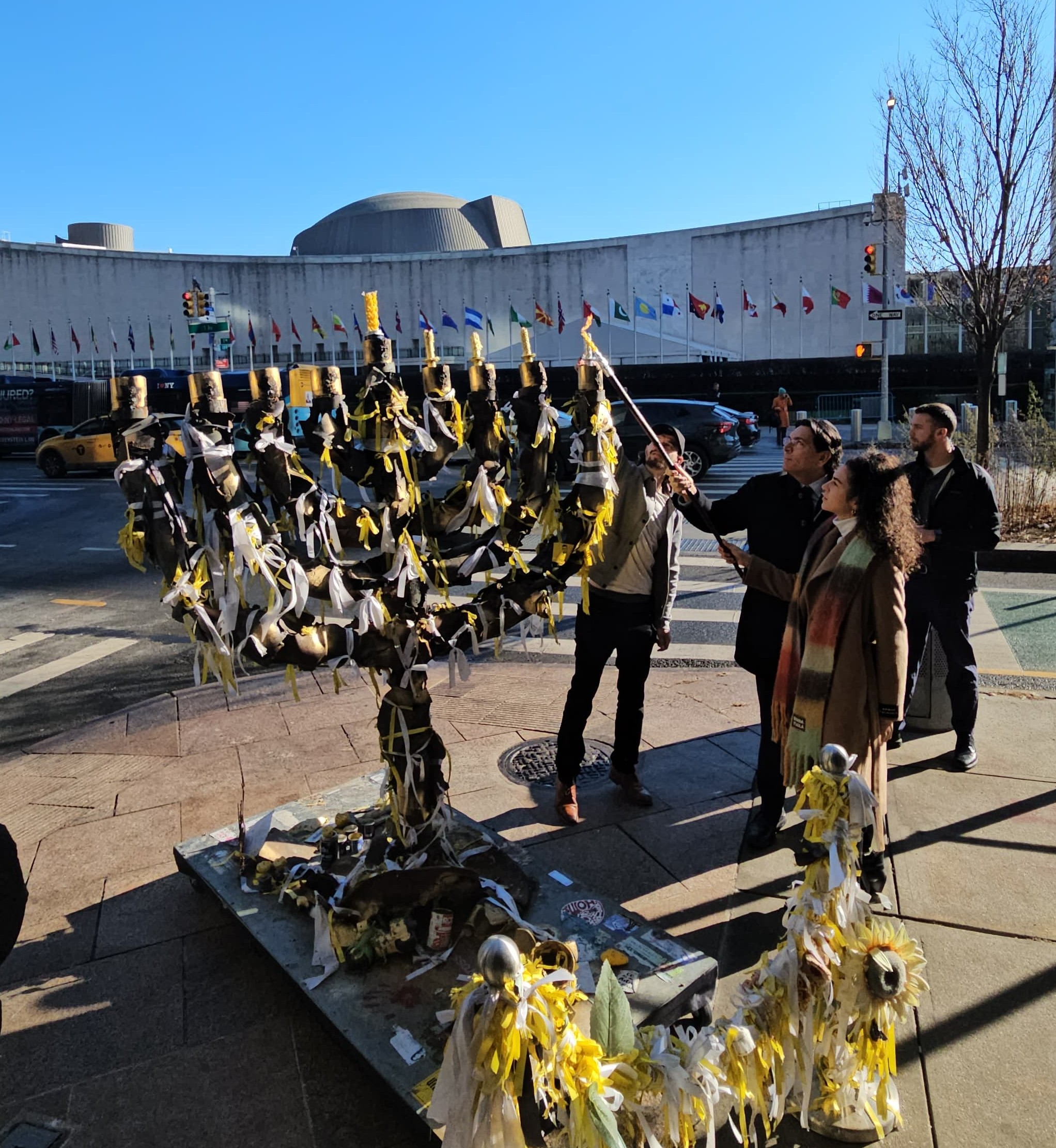
Israel’s Ambassador to the UN, Danny Danon, lighting the Menorah of Hope outside UN Headquarters in New York City, together with the sister of Ran Gvili, the last hostage still held by Hamas, and artist Eli Gross

Hanukkiah of Hope is an Installation by Israeli artist Eli Gross. It was placed in December 2024 in the Hostages Square in Tel Aviv ahead of the Hanukkah holiday, in the context of the Iranian attack on Israel in October 2024 and the Iron Swords War.

The installation is constructed from missile fragments that were launched at Israel from three fronts: Iran, the Gaza Strip and Lebanon. None of the missiles caused casualties. It also incorporates components from Iron Dome interceptors. The hanukkiah was created as a symbol of resilience, hope and the belief in light emerging from destruction.

Gross served more than four hundred days in reserve duty during the Iron Swords War, and his experiences from that period shaped the conceptual foundations of his work. His art focuses on combining materials with security and social resonance, such as missile fragments, with Jewish and national symbols raising questions of memory, repair and hope.

The hanukkiah is approximately one point ninety meters tall and weighs an estimated half ton. It is made of metal sections that underwent heating and shaping, including fragments and missile remains formed into a structure resembling a traditional hanukkiah. Visitors tied thousands of yellow ribbons around its branches as a sign of solidarity and prayer for the return of the hostages. Later, hundreds of white ribbons were added to symbolize joy for the hostages who returned home alive.

During Hanukkah 5785 (2024), candle lighting ceremonies were held around the installation with public figures, representatives of hostage families and wounded soldiers. The hanukkiah became a pilgrimage site and a symbol of hope during one of the most difficult periods in the country's history.

In the following year the hanukkiah remained in Hostages Square, appeared at major public events including the historic Vitkoff speech, and was viewed by hundreds of thousands of visitors and tens of millions through media and social networks.

== Symbolism and impact ==
The hanukkiah expresses the idea of light emerging from darkness and the possibility of transforming materials intended for destruction into a message of life, faith and national resilience. It is considered one of the most recognizable symbols of Hostages Square and of the spirit of unity that characterized the period after the war.

The Wikipedia entry about the Hanukkiah of Hope was displayed next to the installation in the square as part of the public documentation of the artistic project.

Ahead of Hanukkah 5786 (2025), the Hanukkiah of Hope was sent to the United States via diplomatic mail with the assistance of the Israeli Ministry of Foreign Affairs and the Embassy of Israel in the United States.

The menorah, which arrived from Hostages Square in Tel Aviv, was lit during Hanukkah at a series of events in New York City, as part of a tour intended to bring light and hope to Jewish communities in the diaspora.

Among the prominent events, the menorah was lit at an official Hanukkah event hosted by the City of New York at City Hall by outgoing New York City Mayor Eric Adams, who wore a kippah and was accompanied by the community’s rabbi. In addition, the menorah was lit outside the United Nations headquarters in New York City, at a ceremony in which Israel’s Ambassador to the United Nations, Danny Danon, lit the menorah together with Shira Gvili, sister of Ran Gvili, the last hostage still held captive by Hamas, in a prayer for his return to Israel soon.

Alongside the official ceremonies, the Menorah of Hope was also lit in various Jewish communities across the city, including TriBeCa Synagogue in the heart of Manhattan, the Syrian Jewish community in New York, a Hasidic community in Borough Park, and a community in Crown Heights.

- Jewish art
