= Hebrew birthday =

A Hebrew birthday (also known as a Jewish birthday) is the date on which a person is born according to the Hebrew calendar. This is important for Jews, particularly when calculating the correct date for day of birth, day of death, a bar mitzva or a bat mitzva. This is because the Jewish calendar differs from the secular and Christian Gregorian calendar as well as from the Islamic calendar, in most years the two birthdays do not coincide - typically, they coincide just once in 19 years.

"A person wanting to know the civil date for celebrating a Jewish birthday ... must first determine the date within the Jewish calendar (not necessarily a straightforward procedure) and then determine the corresponding day in the civil calendar." The exercise is made more complicated by the fact that Jewish days start and end in the evening, so a person born after dusk will have the following day's date as their birthday.

Especially among Hasidic Jews, there is a custom that a boy's first haircut takes place on his third Hebrew birthday known as an upsherin.
