= Abraham Shemtov =

American rabbi

Rabbi Abraham Shemtov
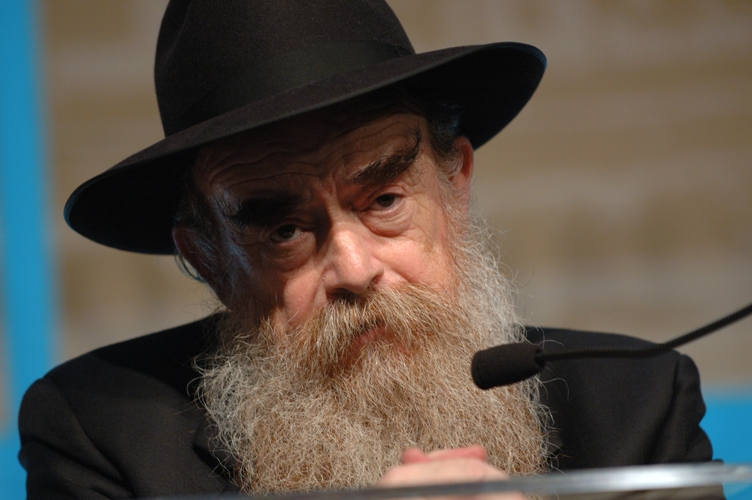
- Born: February 16, 1937 (age 89)

Abraham Shemtov (born February 16, 1937) is an American Chabad-Lubavitch rabbi and a shaliach ("emissary") of the Lubavitcher Rebbe Menachem Mendel Schneerson.

He is chairman of the board of Agudas Chasidei Chabad, the movement's umbrella organization, and was entrusted by the Rebbe with various missions, among them as the movement's envoy to the White House and Capitol Hill. He is the founding national director of American Friends of Lubavitch, Lubavitch activities in Greater Philadelphia, PA, and director of the first Camp Gan Israel in Parksville, NY.

== Activities ==
=== DC lobbying ===
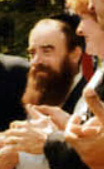
Abraham Shemtov, 1981

Often called the "Rebbe's ambassador to DC", Shemtov developed connections in Washington. He regularly leads Chabad-Lubavitch delegations to the White House and played a pivotal role in the relationships formed between Schneerson and U.S. Presidents Richard Nixon, Gerald Ford, Jimmy Carter, Ronald Reagan, George H. W. Bush, Bill Clinton, George W. Bush, and Barack Obama.

On February 28, 1984, Shemtov was appointed by President Reagan as one of the five members of the National Advisory Council on Adult Education. Under Shemtov's influence, the U.S. Senate declared the Education and Sharing Day, U.S.A., on Schneerson's Hebrew birthday. The proclamation is signed yearly by the President of the United States.

In addition, Shemtov had successfully lobbied for a Congressional Gold Medal given to Rabbi Schneerson in September 1995 after his death on June 12, 1994, at 92. At a White House ceremony, Shemtov received the award on behalf of the Rebbe. Schneerson was the first religious leader ever awarded the Congressional Gold Medal.

=== Polish archive ===
During the Russian Revolution, the Bolsheviks confiscated the fifth Rebbe's sizable book collection and to this day, it is still in the hands of the Russian government, housed in the main library in Moscow. When the sixth Lubavitcher Rebbe fled Nazi-occupied Warsaw in 1939 for the United States, the library was confiscated. Upon revealing the location of manuscripts at the government-controlled Yiddisher Historic Institute in Warsaw, Shemtov was asked to help assist Rabbi Yehuda Krinsky in pursuing its release. Through the help of the U.S. State Department, Shemtov spent three years en route Europe - U.S. in negotiation with the communist Polish government.

At the end of 1977, the books were placed in the Library of Agudas Chassidei Chabad.

=== Chanukah phenomenon ===
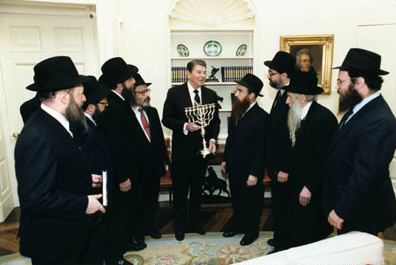
President Ronald Reagan receives menorah from Rabbi Abraham Shemtov and a delegation representing the "American Friends of Lubavitch," White House, 1984.

Shemtov is credited for erecting the first public Chanukah menorah in the United States. This practice, which started out as a folksy phenomenon generating legal controversy, has since become a part of the public holiday scene in thousands of cities across the globe. Shemtov kindled a small menorah at the foot of the Liberty Bell at Independence Hall in Philadelphia In 1974.

A similar menorah is set up by Shemtov on the White House lawn, being called by President Reagan "the National Menorah."

In 1984, on the eve of Hanukkah, Shemtov hosted a visit to the White House by a delegation of rabbis from "The American Friends of Lubavitch." The group recounted that they were surprised that, when the time had come for them to leave, the President invited them to remain a little longer, so that he could tell them a story about a rabbi serving as a Navy chaplain. He shared with them the story of Rabbi Arnold Resnicoff, whose kippa, skullcap, had to be discarded after the 1983 Beirut barracks bombing, because it was covered in blood after being used to wipe the faces of wounded Marines, and so a Catholic chaplain tore a piece of his camouflage uniform off, to be used as a temporary replacement for the kippa. The President asked the group about the tradition for Jewish men to cover their heads, and Shemtov replied, "Mr. President, the kippa to us is a sign of reverence." A colleague in the group, Rabbi Feller, continued, "We place the kippa on the very highest point of our being -- on our head, the vessel of our intellect -- to tell ourselves and the world that there is something which is above man's intellect -- the infinite Wisdom of G-d." Reagan later thanked the group in an official February 12, 1985, White House letter to Shemtov, ending with the prayer: "May the light of the menorah always be a source of strength and inspiration to the Jewish people and to all mankind."

=== Messianism ===
In regard to the state of Chabad-Lubavitch after the passing of Rabbi Schneerson and the activities of Messianism, Shemtov said: "Lubavitch went through a very difficult period, and turmoil, and what you are seeing now is the settling of the dust, and people begin to realize what are we really there for.”

== Family ==
Shemtov is married to Batsheva Shemtov (née Lazaroff), an educator and community activist. They have six children.

- Eliezer Shemtov, rabbi and director of Beit Jabad del Uruguay in Montevideo, Uruguay
- Menachem Mendel Shemtov, M.D., Cornell Urology Physician in New York City
- Goldie Avtzon, co-director of Chabad of Hong Kong, China
- Yehuda Shemtov, rabbi and executive director of Lubavitch of Bucks County in Newtown, PA
- Levi Shemtov, rabbi and director of American Friends of Lubavitch in Washington, DC
- Shimon Shemtov, filmmaker

== Ronald Perelman ==
Industrialist Ronald O. Perelman, chairman and chief executive officer of MacAndrews & Forbes Holdings, is a friend and disciple of Rabbi Shemtov. They have met in Shemtov's Lubavitcher Center in Philadelphia and have deeply connected. Ever since, Perelman has attended prayers in synagogues, kept Kosher and the Sabbath. Shemtov regularly commutes from Philadelphia to the financier's East 63rd Street residence in New York City. "We discuss lessons from the Bible. It's a central dimension of his life", Shemtov has told the Washington Post.

Shemtov has accompanied Perelman in his meeting with the Lubavitcher Rebbe at the Lubavitch World Headquarters in Brooklyn. Showing the merchant praise, the Rebbe has called him "my partner in charitable activities."

Perelman generously donates to Shemtov and Lubavitch causes. He is National Chairman of American Friends of Lubavitch and chief benefactor of Campus Chomesh - home of Associated Beth Rivkah Girls Schools, named after Rebbetzin Chaya Mushka Schneerson, wife of the Lubavitcher Rebbe.

On June 21, 2006, Shemtov and Perelman established a fund under the auspices of Agudas Chassidei Chabad to financially assist new Chabad-Lubavitch emissaries. “You are terribly important to us as Jews, to us as parents, and to us that know the importance of keeping Judaism alive,” Perelman has told the grantees - 20 enthusiastic Lubavitch couples.
