= Congregation Lubavitch =

Chabad organization in New York City

- Congregation Lubavitch Inc.
- Abbreviation: CLI
- Nickname: Gabboim of 770
- Type: 501(c)(3) organization
- Headquarters: 770 Eastern Parkway
- Location: New York City, United States
- Official language: English, Hebrew
- Gabboim: Avrohom Holtzberg, Zalman Lipsker, Yosef Losh
- Affiliations: Chabad
- Website: https://www.770shul.org/

Congregation Lubavitch a.k.a. Congregation Lubavitch Inc. (CLI) is a Chabad organization consisting of the gabboim (synagogue trustees) of the primary synagogue and Chabad world headquarters, 770 Eastern Parkway. As of 2024, the Gabboim are Rabbi Avrohom Holtzberg, Rabbi Zalman Lipsker, and Rabbi Yosef Losh. The gabboim are responsible for organizing tefilah (prayer services) for the congregants as well as maintaining financial affairs including selling assigned seating for Jewish holidays and Shabbats. The organization is Meshichist, or affiliated with Chabad Messaniasim, which is in contrast to the mainstream Chabad establishment organizations.

== History ==
In June 2010, the Gabboim were ordered by a New York judge to transfer the control of the shul to Agudas Chassidei Chabad and Merkos L'inyonei Chinuch, the central organizations of Chabad.

In 2010, Congregation Lubavitch reinstalled a disputed (Even HaPinah) Cornerstone plaque.

Following the New York City synagogue tunnel incident, on January 12, 2024, Congregation Lubavitch announced that repairs has been completed and that 770 would open for Shabbat services. They announced a new overnight closure policy for security and a new set of rules that all attendees must agree to abide by.

On January 14, 2024, the Gabboim published a letter forbidding bochurim from participating in the Shvil (path) ritual. During the Rebbe's lifetime, a pathway was created to allow him to enter and exit 770. The creation of a Shvil post the rebbe's death has become a controversial Meshichist ritual in which followers open up a path in the crowd for the deceased rebbe to spiritually walk through.

On January 19th 2024, an Appellate Court hearing the case of Agudas Chasidei Chabad v Congregation Lubavitch returned it's verdict reaffirming Agudas Chasidei Chabad's control of all buildings associated with 770 Eastern Parkway with the exception of the synagogue itself, which they reversed a previous courts decision and gave to the Gabboim saying that they could not be evicted.
