= 770 Eastern Parkway =

Lubavitch World Headquarters

770 Eastern Parkway Agudas Chasidei Chabad
- Yiddish: 770 איסטערן פארקוויי
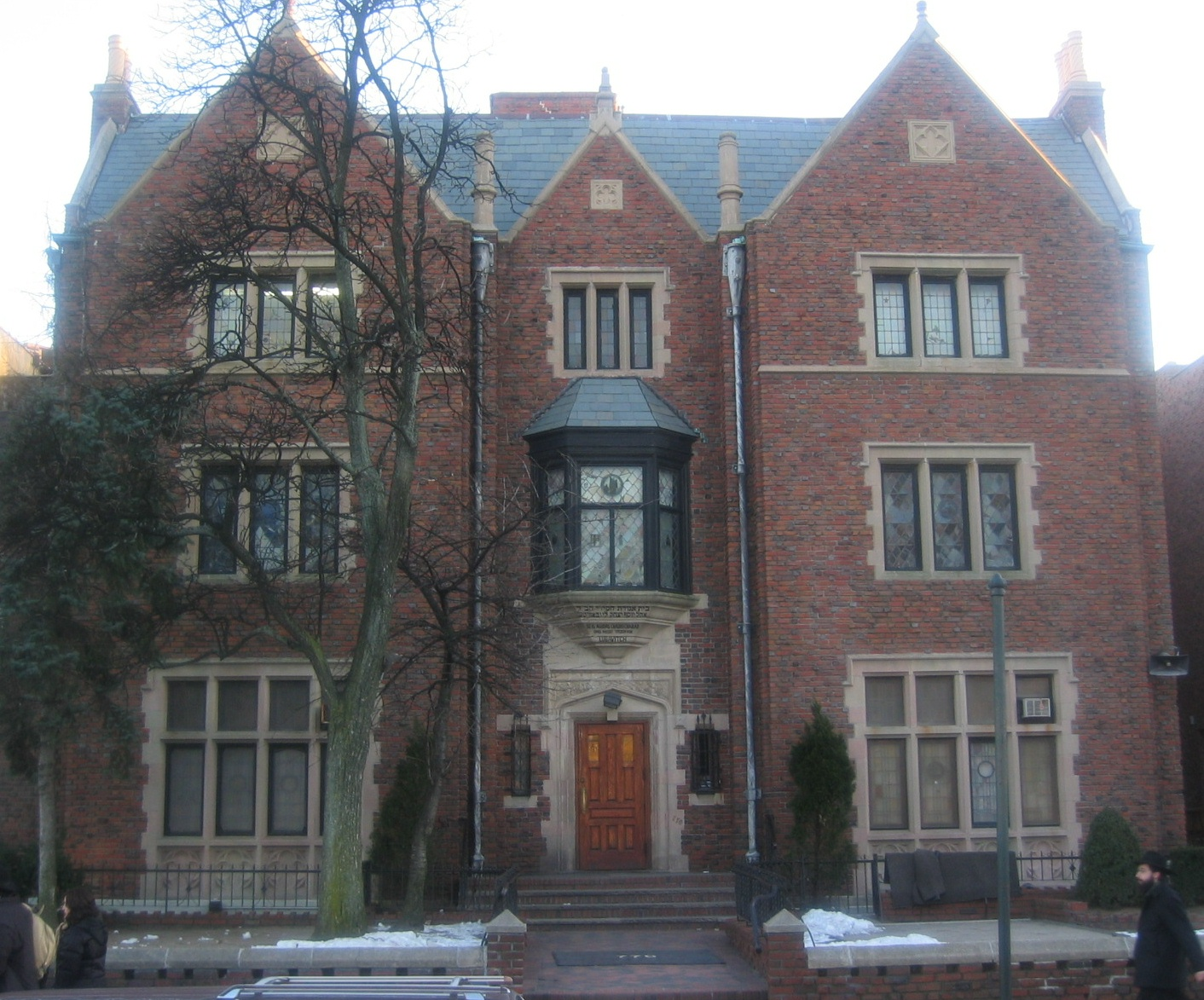

- Location in New York City

Religion
- Affiliation: Chabad-Lubavitch
- Rite: Nusach Ari
- Ecclesiastical or organisational status: Synagogue; Chabad Headquarters
- Ownership: Agudas Chasidei Chabad
- Leadership: Congregation Lubavitch
- Year consecrated: 1940 (5700)
- Status: Active

Location
- Location: 770 Eastern Parkway, Crown Heights, Brooklyn, New York City, New York
- Country: United States
- Coordinates: 40°40′08″N 73°56′34″W

Architecture
- Architect: Edwin Kline
- Type: Residence and synagogue
- Style: Collegiate Gothic Revival
- Founder: The Previous Lubavitcher Rebbe - Rabbi Yosef Yitzchok Schneersohn
- Completed: 1920

770 Eastern Parkway (Yiddish: 770 איסטערן פארקוויי), also known as "770" ("Seven Seventy"), is the street address of the World Headquarters of the Chabad-Lubavitch Hasidic movement, located on Eastern Parkway in the Crown Heights neighborhood of Brooklyn, New York. The building is the center of the Chabad-Lubavitch world movement and considered by many to be an iconic site in Judaism.

== Description ==
770 is an iconic site considered holy by members of the Chabad movement. It attracts thousands of visitors from around the world every year. The building is recognized as an Orthodox Jewish synagogue, which is open to all people, with a men's section on the ground floor and a women's section on the floor above it. On Shabbat and holidays, smaller prayer groups can be found congregating throughout the building, including the lobby and office used by the Rebbe within the original 770 building.

The original building is part of a larger block maintained by the Agudas Chasidei Chabad. This block includes the larger synagogue, a Kollel, and the community's central library, Library of Agudas Chassidei Chabad. It also houses the offices of Agudas Chasidei Chabad, Merkos L'Inyonei Chinuch, and other Chabad organizations.

The synagogue's official name is Congregation Lubavitch of Agudas Chasidei Chabad.

== History ==
The house, in Collegiate Gothic Revival style, was built in 1920, designed by Edwin Kline, and originally served as a medical office. In 1940, with the assistance of Jacob Rutstein and his son Nathan Rothstein, the building was purchased by Agudas Chasidei Chabad on behalf of the Chabad Lubavitch movement and as a home for Rabbi Yosef Yitzchak Schneersohn when he arrived in the United States in 1940. Because Rabbi Schneersohn used a wheelchair, a building with an elevator needed to be purchased for his use as both a home and as a synagogue.

The building, which soon became known as 770, became the hub and central location for Chabad during the 1940s. It served as the main Chabad synagogue, a yeshiva, and offices for the Merkos L'Inyonei Chinuch. Rabbi Yosef Yitzchak Schneersohn lived in an apartment on the second floor. When Rabbi Menachem Mendel Schneerson arrived from Vichy France to New York in 1941, his father-in-law appointed him as chairman of Merkos L'Inyonei Chinuch. The younger Rabbi Schneerson's office was located on the first floor of 770, near the synagogue.

After Yosef Yitzchok's passing in January 1950, his son-in-law and successor, Menachem Mendel Schneerson, continued to use his own office on the main floor to lead the movement, while maintaining his personal residence on President Street, several blocks away. Yosef Yitzchok's wife remained resident in her apartment on the second floor until her death. Her two daughters would often visit her in her apartment, and during her lifetime the new Rebbe would conduct semi-private meals there for the family and selected visitors on festive occasions. Today, the previous Rebbe's apartment and office are closed to the public. Since 1994, Rabbi Menachem Mendel's office on the first floor is used on Shabbat and Jewish holidays as an additional prayer room open to the public during prayer times.

From its inception the synagogue has served three parallel purposes. It is a place of daily prayer services, a study hall for advanced students, and an assembly hall for Chabad gatherings, known as Farbrengens. Here the Lubavitcher Rebbe or elder Chassidim would address Chassidim and other visitors about Torah observance and Chassidic philosophy and practice.

As the Lubavitch movement grew in the United States, the original synagogue became too small to house the chasidim and students who came to pray and study there. The synagogue was expanded in several stages. The first annex was added in 1960, with subsequent expansions taking place in the late 1960s and again in the mid-1970s. The synagogue then reached its current size. The original synagogue remains as a small study hall used by rabbinical students during the week. In 1988, Rabbi Schneerson laid the cornerstone for an ongoing renovation project.

In 1991, the neighborhood around the Chabad headquarters was the site of the Crown Heights riot between Orthodox Jewish residents and African American residents. Black residents outraged by a boy's death in a crash involving the motorcade of Rebbe Menachem Mendel Schneerson attacked Jews, homes and businesses for three days.

On December 9, 2014, an individual with a documented history of mental health issues entered a synagogue and assaulted a student with a knife. Another student present reported that the assailant yelled threats during the incident. A police officer at the scene engaged with the assailant in an effort to detain him. The confrontation resulted in the officer fatally shooting the assailant.

=== Visiting dignitaries ===
770 has attracted visits from a wide range of prominent figures, including political leaders, diplomats, and heads of state. During Schneerson's lifetime, many came to seek his counsel or pay their respects, among them Robert F. Kennedy, Israeli Prime Minister Menachem Begin and future prime ministers Yitzhak Rabin, and Benjamin Netanyahu, Israeli President Zalman Shazar and future Israeli President Shimon Peres, as well as New York City mayors John Lindsay, Ed Koch, David Dinkins, and future Mayor Rudy Giuliani. Since his death, visits have continued from dignitaries such as Mayor Bill de Blasio, Mayor Eric Adams, Israeli ministers Yoav Gallant and Nir Barkat, and Argentinian President Javier Milei.

In 2025, Israeli far-right Minister Itamar Ben-Gvir visited 770, drawing protests in response to his racist anti-Arab views and fierce opposition to a cease-fire in the Gaza Strip.

=== Tunnel incident ===
In December 2023, an unauthorized underground digging was discovered connecting the main synagogue to a nearby unused mikveh. The New York Times reported that the tunnel was part of an attempted expansion of 770. In response, Chabad leadership closed the women's balcony on the floor above until the tunnel could be filled in and called in construction crews to flood the expansion with concrete. When workers tried to fill the tunnel on January 8, 2024, clashes broke out between Chabad messianists, who tried to prevent the tunnel from being filled, and the New York City Police Department (NYPD). The NYPD arrested nine people, and the building was temporarily closed pending a structural safety review. Footage of the January 8 incident and tunnel went viral on social media.

=== Car ramming attack ===
On the evening of January 28, 2026, a car repeatedly drove into an entrance of the building causing damage to the building. The driver was arrested by police, and the building was evacuated. The suspect was charged with attempted assault with a hate crime enhancement and other crimes. Police said the suspect had been to the synagogue and other synagogues before. According to eyewitnesses, the suspect had been to 770 a few weeks earlier where Chabad followers wrapped teffilin on him. The attack happened during a Chabad holiday, with thousands of teenagers attending the event.

=== Ownership dispute ===
The ownership dispute, formally known as Agudas Chasidei Chabad v. Congregation Lubavitch is a decades-long legal conflict over control of the main synagogue at 770 Eastern Parkway commonly referred to as the (large) Zal (Hebrew: הזאל) or the main shul.

The dispute concerns the primary synagogue space located beneath 784 and 788 Eastern Parkway. The parties are Agudas Chasidei Chabad the central organization representing the Chabad-Lubavitch movement, and Congregation Lubavitch, a body composed of the synagogue's Gabboim, who oversee its day-to-day operations.

In January 2024, a New York appellate court ruled that Agudas Chasidei Chabad retains control over the broader 770 Eastern Parkway properties, but reversed a lower court ruling regarding the synagogue itself, holding that Congregation Lubavitch could not be evicted from the main sanctuary.

In June 2024, a subsequent appeal was denied, leaving the appellate court's ruling in place.

== Livestream ==
A continuous livestream (excluding shabbat and holidays) of the main synagogue in 770 has been in operation since 1999. Hosted at 770live.com, Daily Tefilla, Shiurs, Siyums, Farbrengens and other events are all streamed on the site.

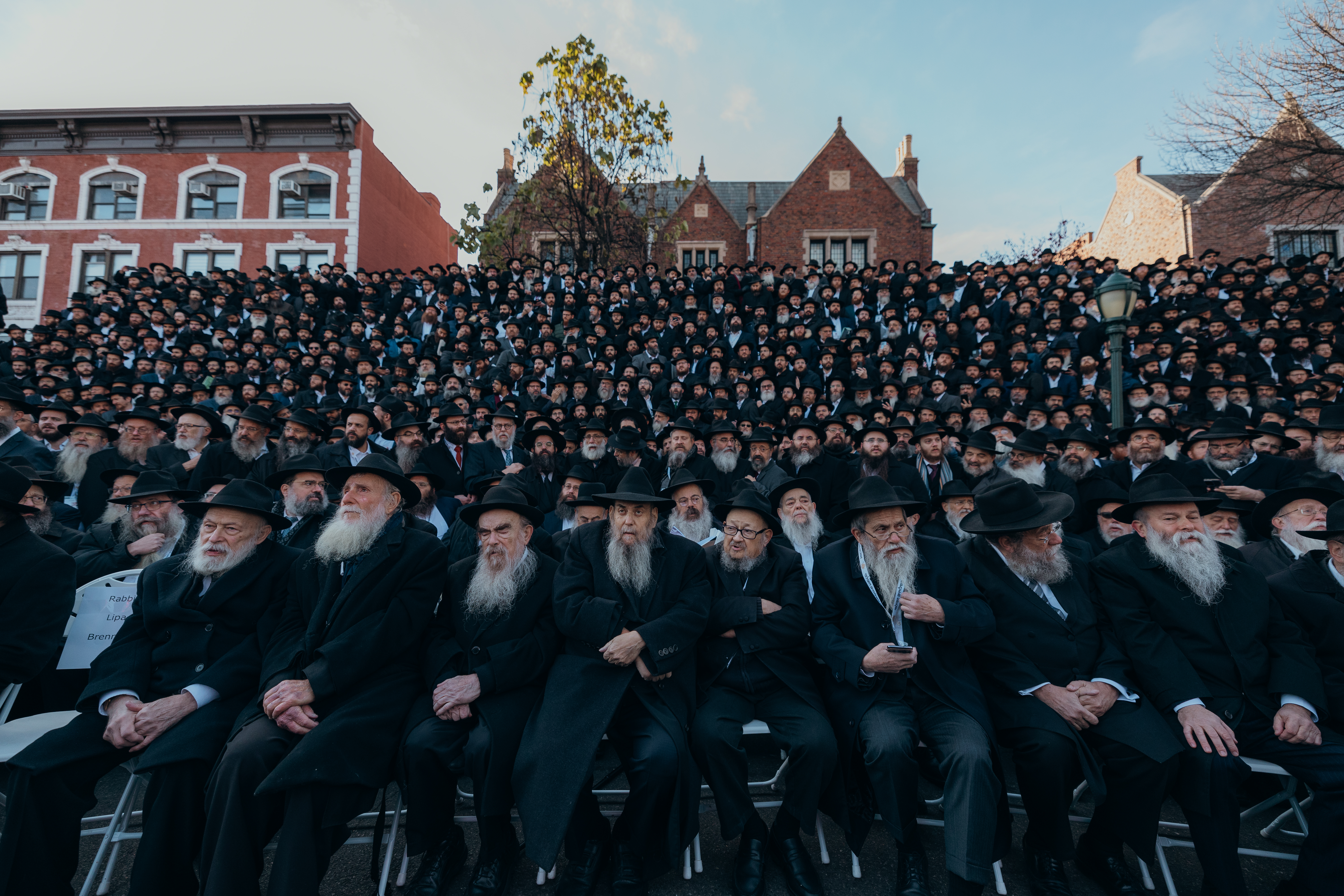
770 is the backdrop for the photo of Chabad rabbis taken annually during the Kinus

== Main synagogue ==
Main synagogue is also known as "The main shul", "The big Zal"The building contains a stairway that leads to the main synagogue. The synagogue is underground, and is considered part of 770, although it technically is mostly under 784 and 788.

== Central Lubavitcher Yeshiva ==
The building contains a Yeshiva with approximately 1,000 students. The Yeshiva is a part of a group of Yeshivot called Tomchei Tmimim, started by the 5th Chabad Rebbe Sholom Dovber Schneersohn of Lubavitch.

== Replicas ==
Lubavitch Chassidim attach great significance to everything that played a role in the Rebbe's life; therefore, Lubavitch Chassidim all over the world have built replicas or near-replicas of the building. These include replicas in Ramat Shlomo in Jerusalem and Kfar Chabad in Israel. Other replicas include UCLA Chabad House at UCLA Los Angeles, California; Moshiach Center In Fort Lauderdale Fl, Chabad House at Rutgers University in New Brunswick, New Jersey; Congregation Ahavat Shalom in Ocean City, Maryland; in Los Angeles, California; in St Kilda East, Victoria, a suburb of Melbourne, Australia; in Milan, Italy; in Brazil; in Argentina; in Chile, in Kamianske, Ukraine; in Camp Gan Israel in Montreal, Quebec and Baltimore, Maryland.

In 2021 The Forward wrote that there were an estimated 35 replicas of 770, most of which were Chabad Houses. The article 770 Eastern Parkway replicas documents 58 replicas, existing and planned.

Other replicas include Tzedakah boxes, plastic building block sets, 3D puzzles, and mezuzah cases. The facade is also often used as a design element on Tefillin and Tallit bags, and Torah and Torah ark covers and on other Judaica.

== See also ==
- 770live.com
- 770 Eastern Parkway replicas
- 770 Eastern Parkway tunnel incident

== Gallery ==
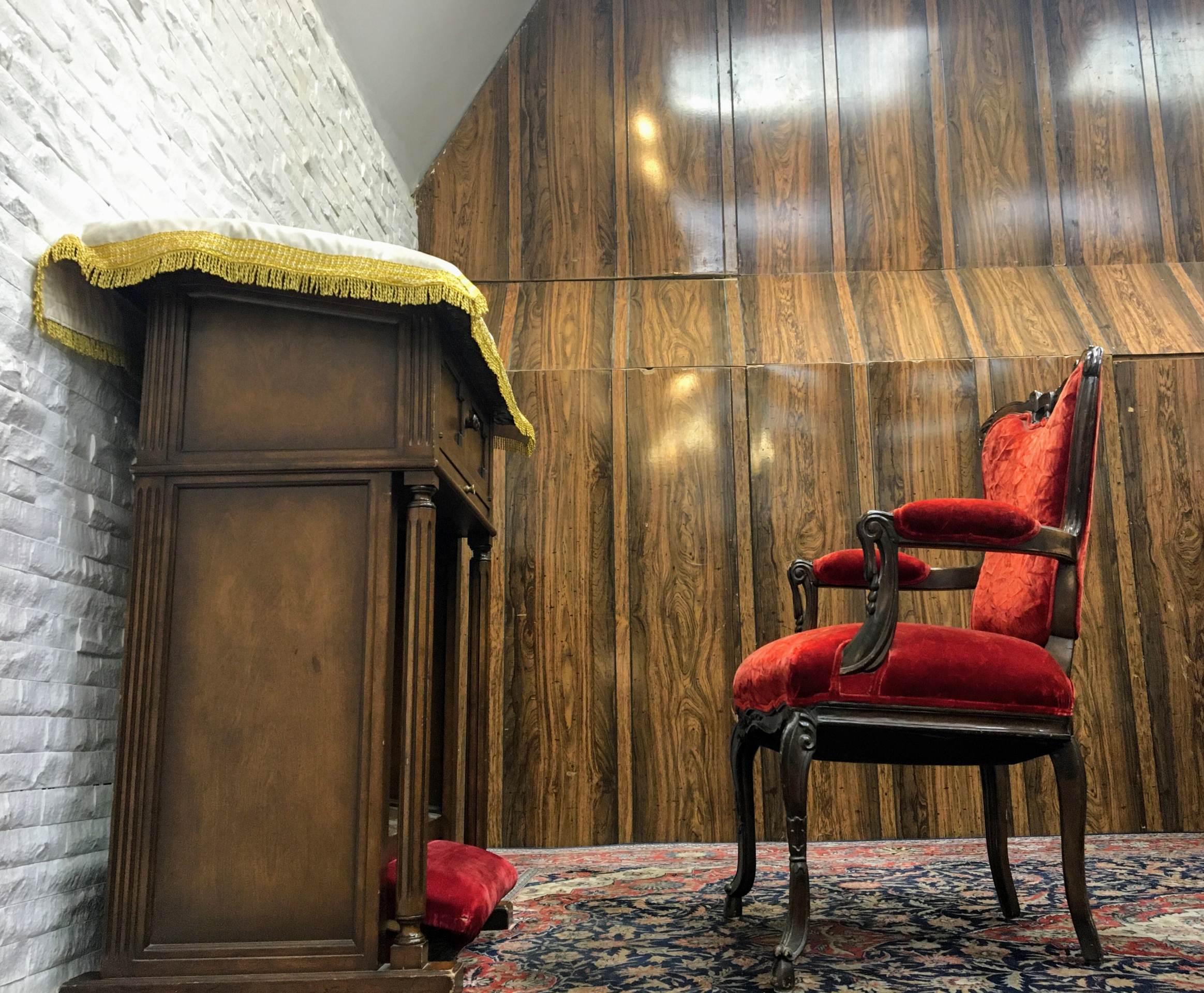
The Rebbe's place in the main synagogue at 770

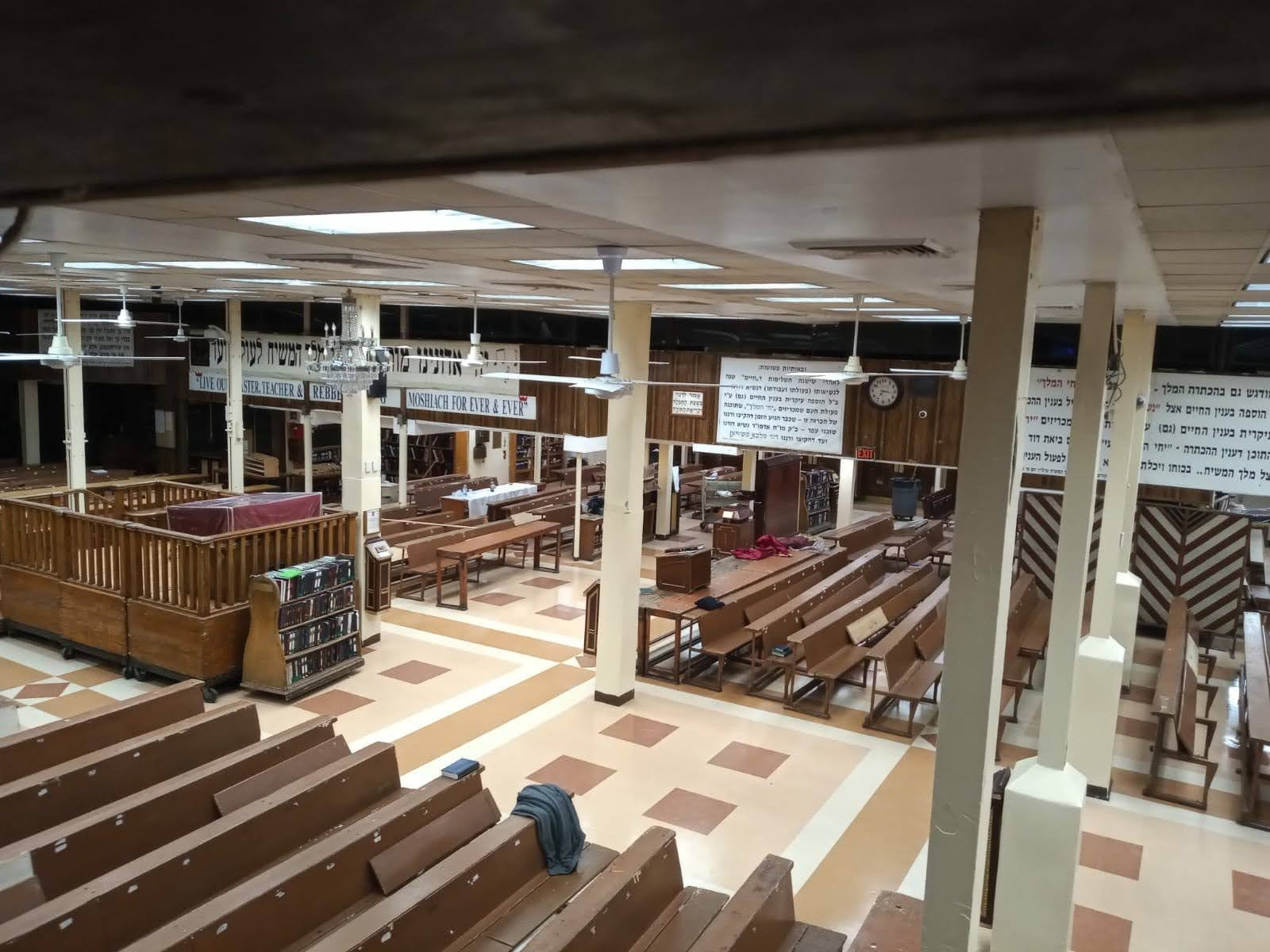
Partial view of interior synagogue

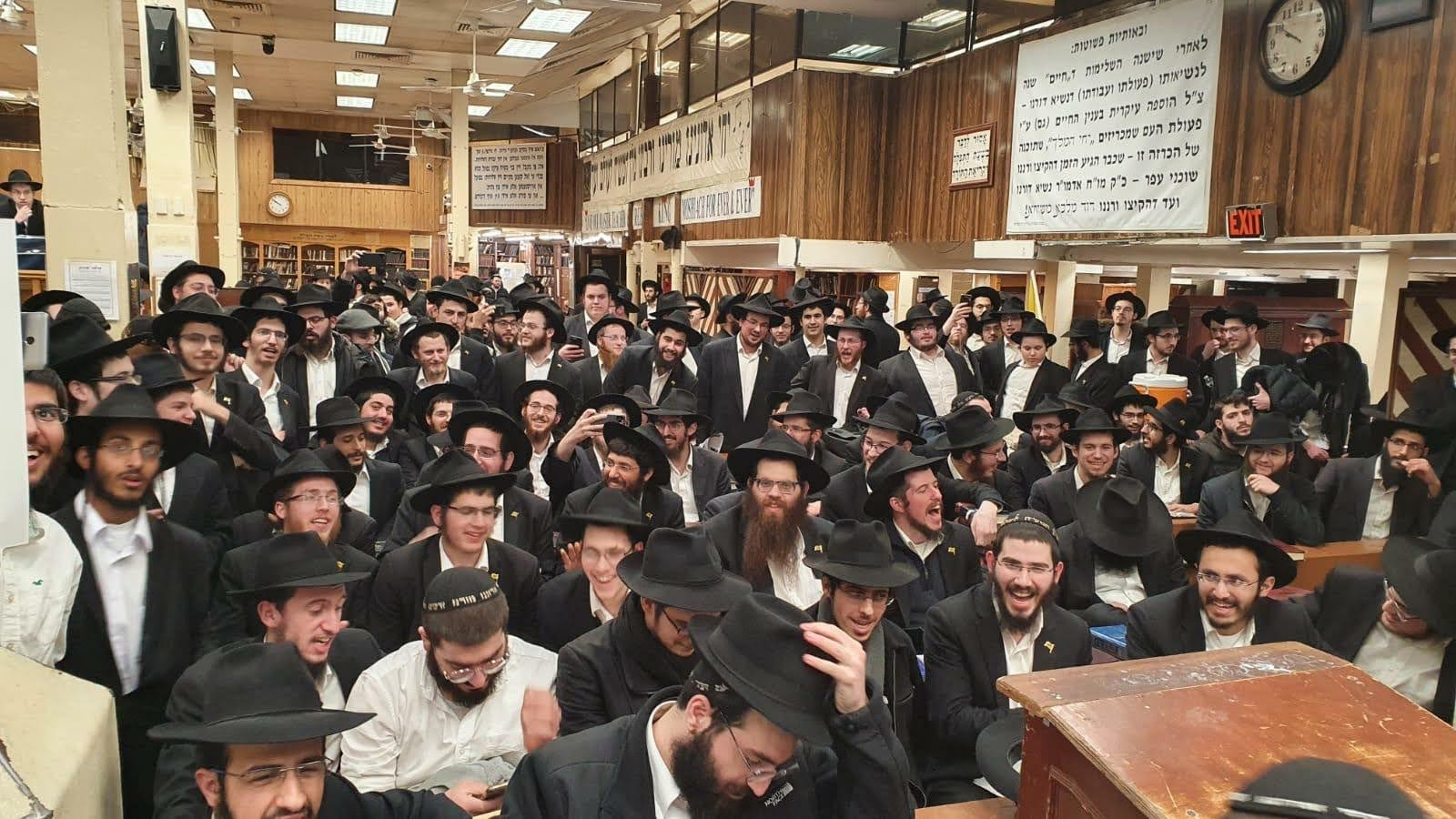
Chabad Hasidim in the main synagogue at 770

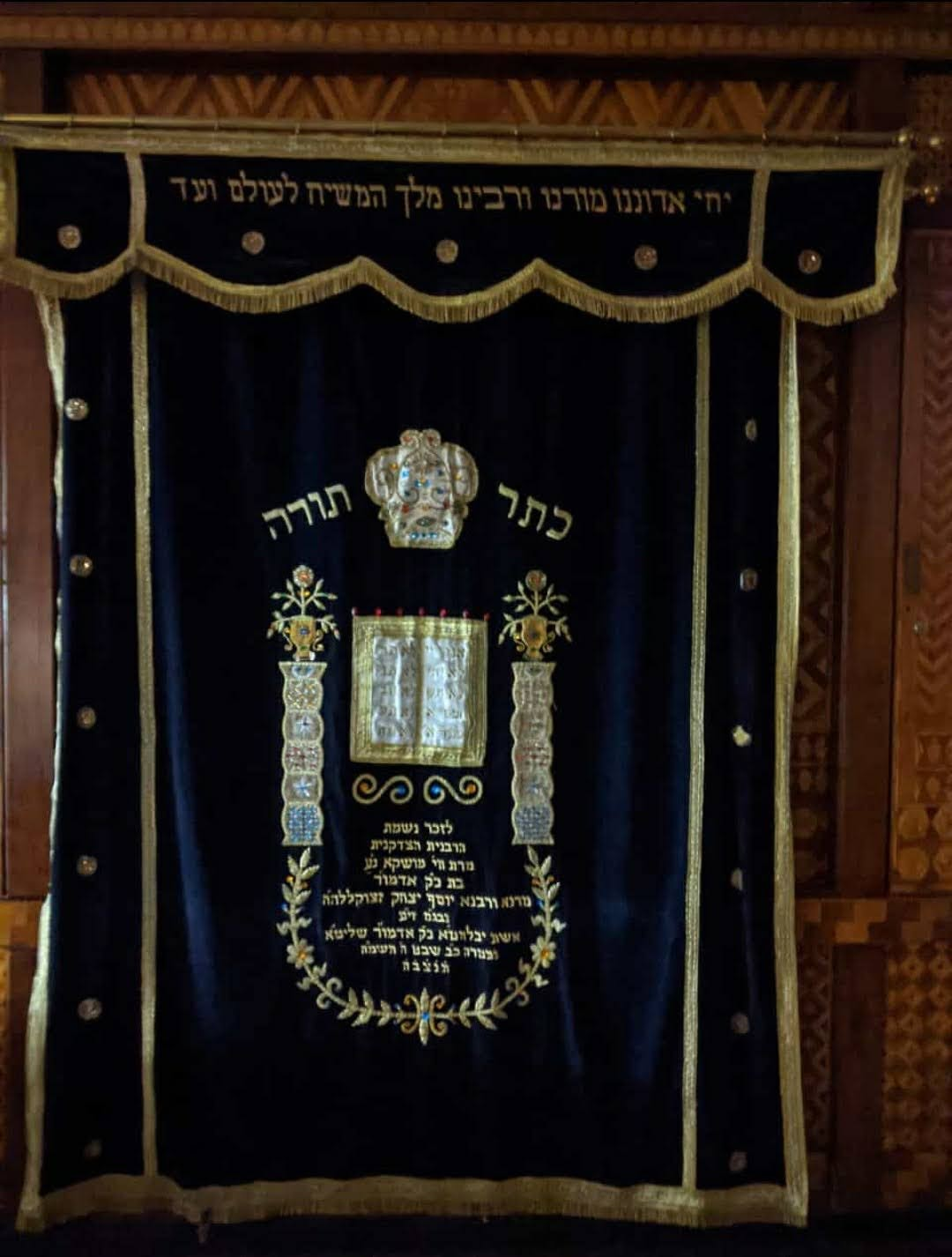
The parochet at 770 Eastern Parkway

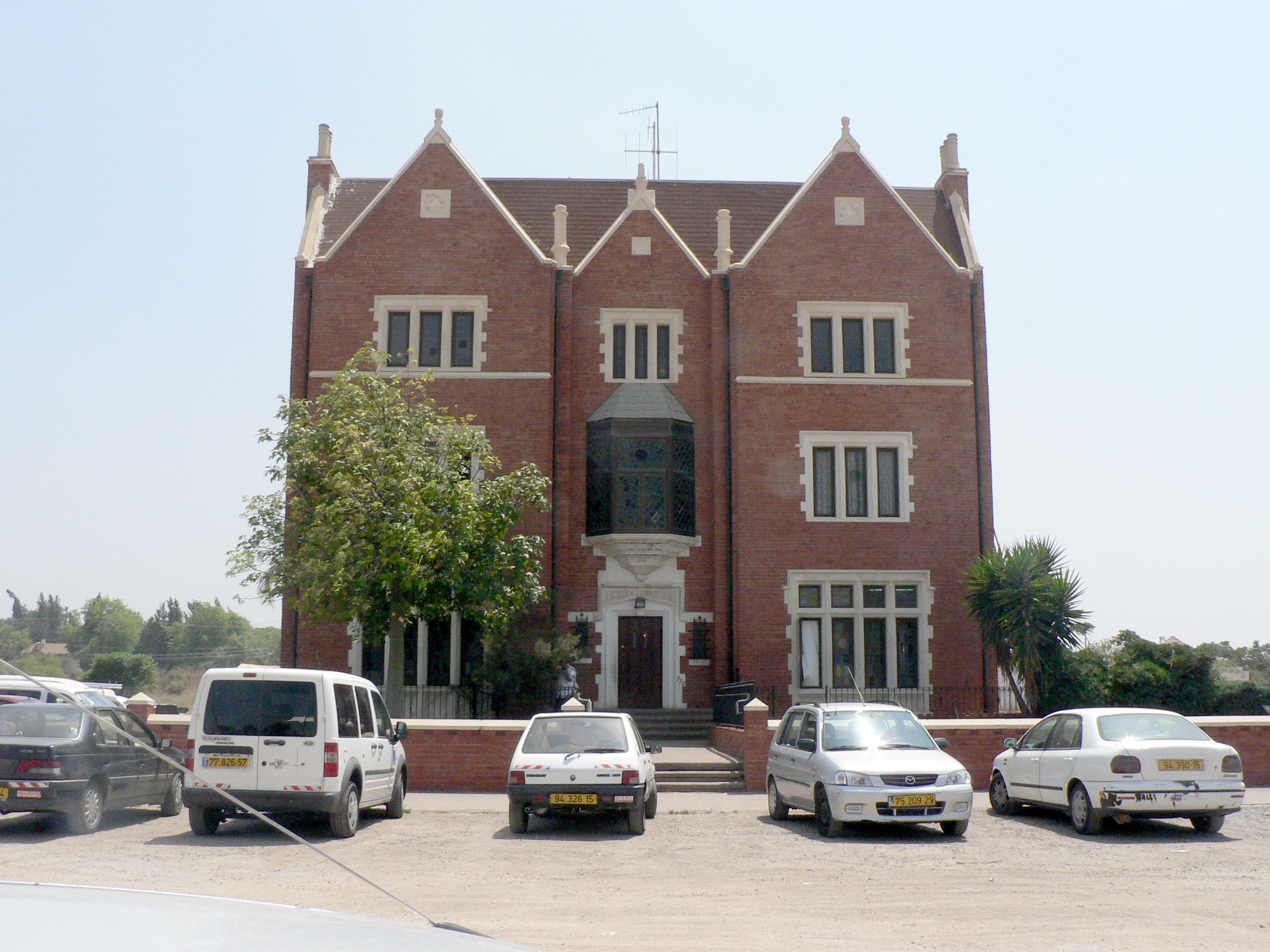
770 replica in Kfar Chabad, Israel

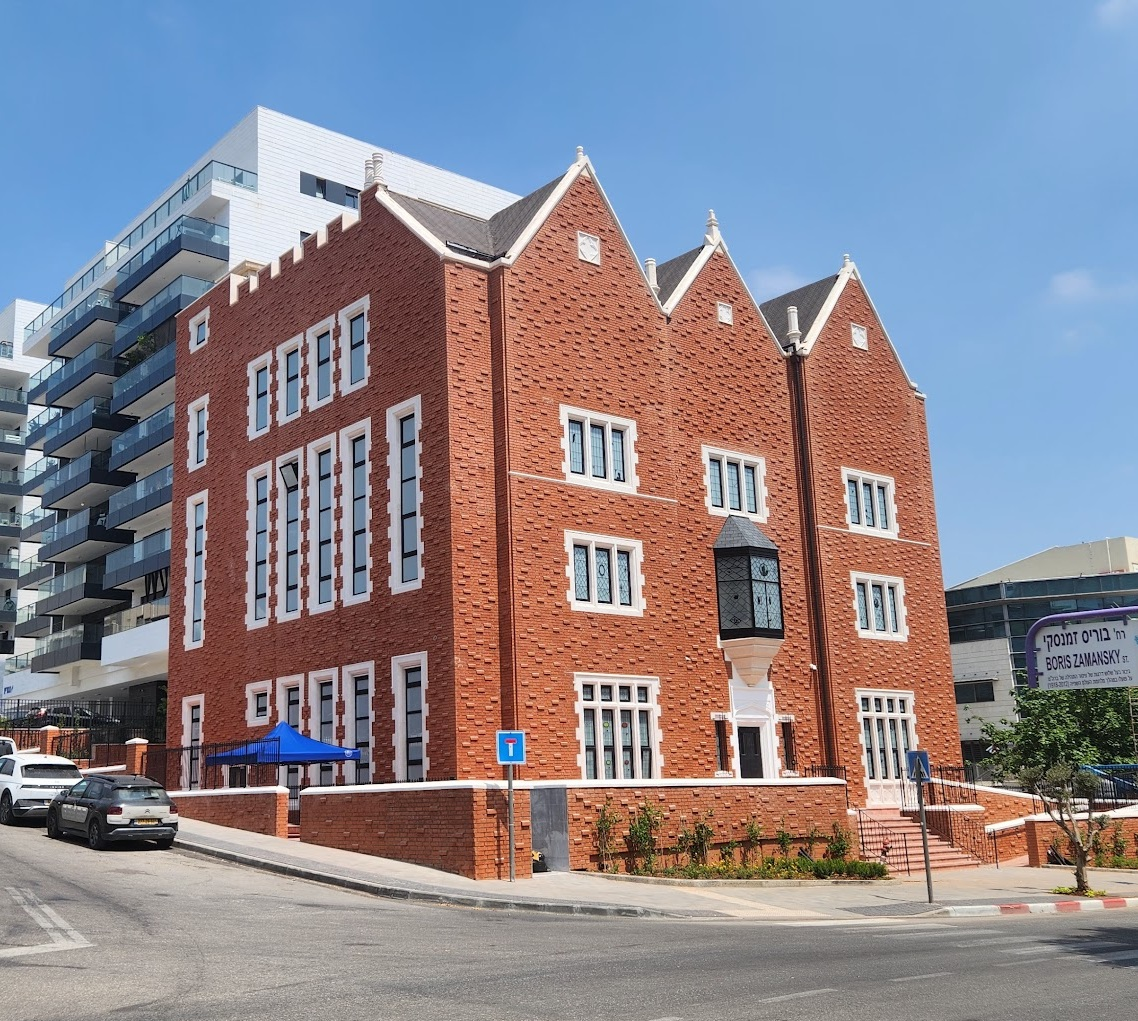
770 replica in Rishon LeZion, Israel

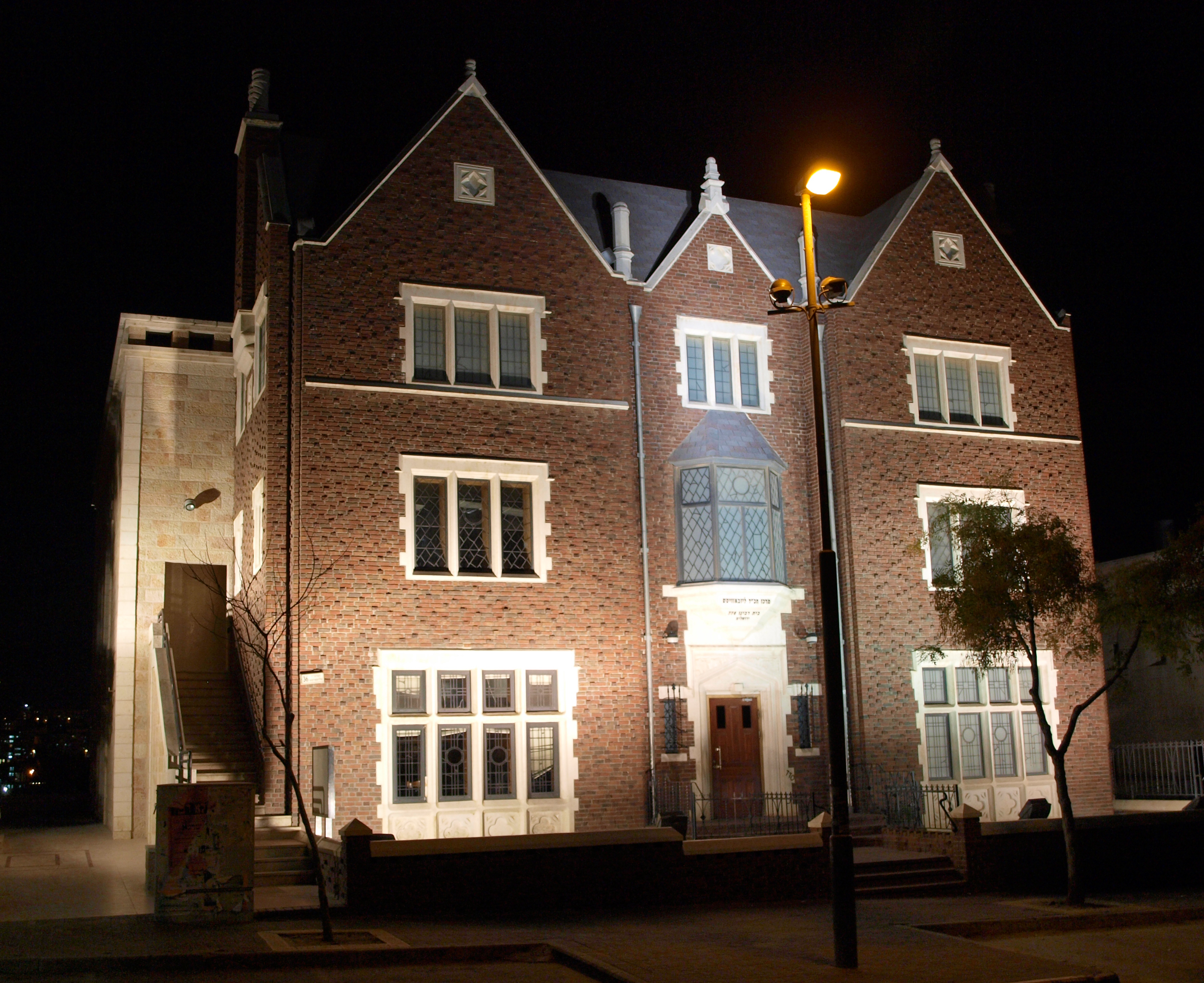
770 replica in Ramat Shlomo, Jerusalem

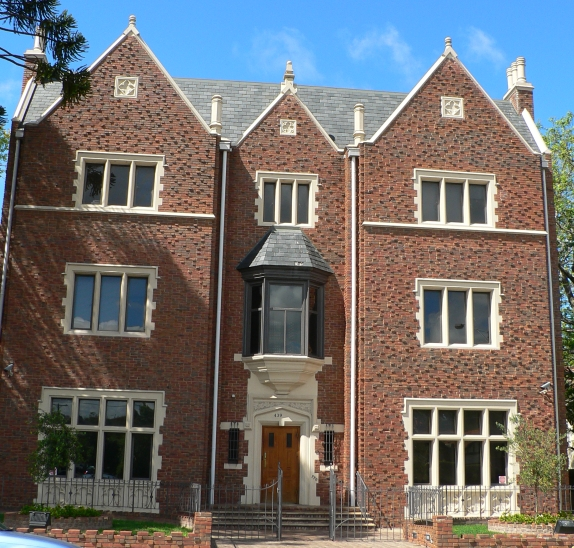
770 replica in Melbourne, Australia

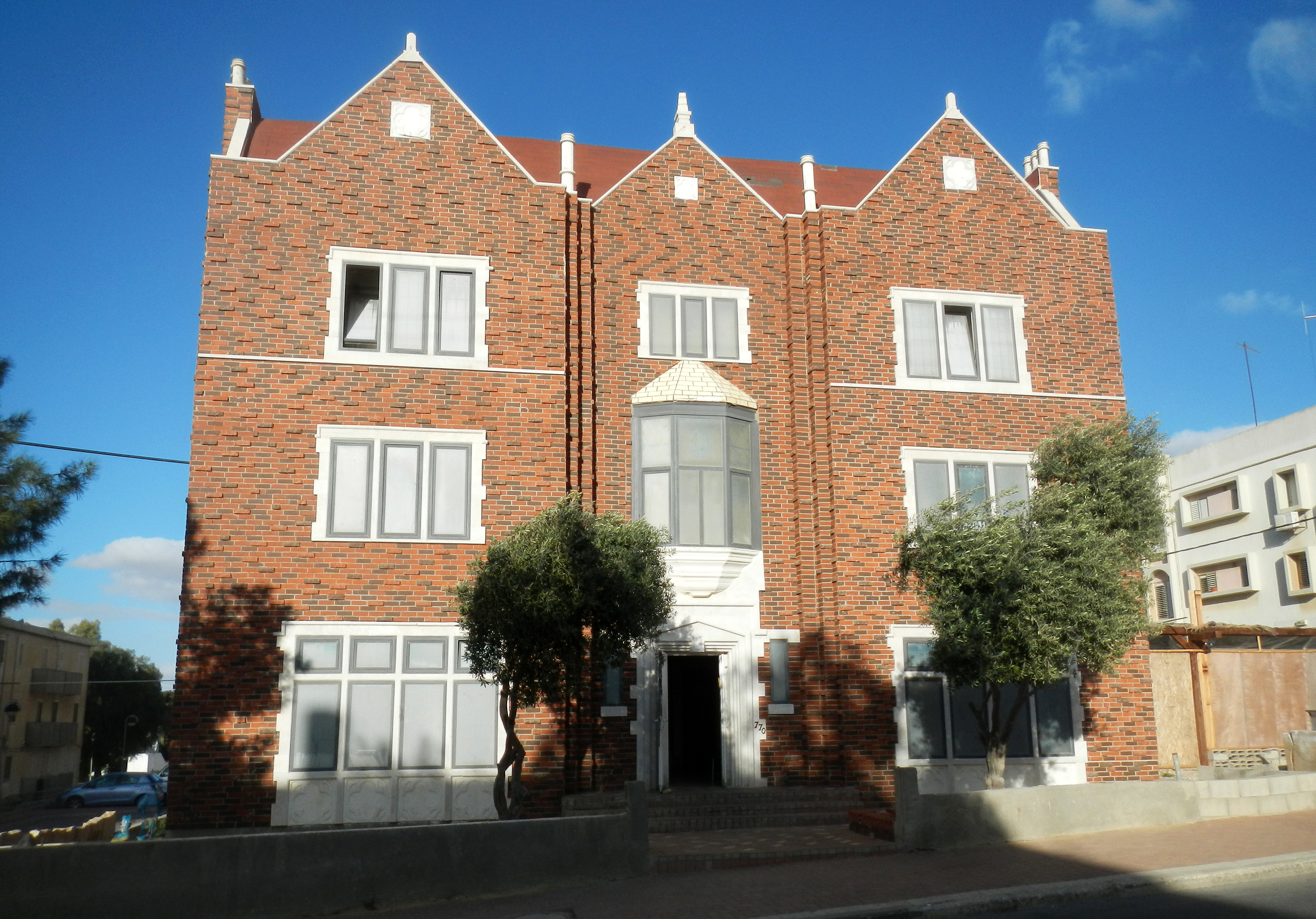
Replica of 770 Eastern Parkway in Mitzpe Ramon, Israel

Replica of 770 at Chabad of Flushing under construction; Rendering on right.
