= Eliyahu Simpson =

Rabbi (1889–1976)

Rabbi Eliyahu Simpson

Personal life
- Born: 1889 Babruysk, Russian Empire
- Died: December 1976 (aged 86–87) New York City, New York, U.S.

Religious life
- Religion: Judaism

Jewish leader
- Successor: Avrohom Rosenfeld
- Synagogue: Nusach Ari Tzemach Tzedek
- Yahrtzeit: 29 Kislev, 5737

Eliyahu Simpson (Yaichel) (1889–1976) was the Rabbi of the Nusach Ari Tzemach Tzedek Synagogue in Borough Park, Brooklyn for over fifty years. He was one of the heads of Agudas Chasidei Chabad and served as personal gabbai for Rabbi Yosef Yitzchak Schneersohn, the sixth Rebbe of Lubavitch, after the latter's arrival in the United States.

Rabbi Simpson was born at Babruysk in 1889. He studied at Tomchei Tmimim in Lubavitch for over thirteen years, where he was close to the Rebbe Rashab. He died at New York City on December 21, 1976, after-which he was succeeded as Rabbi of the Synagogue by his son-in-law, Rabbi Avrohom Rosenfeld. Rabbi Rosenfeld's son is married to the daughter of Aaron Rubashkin.
