= 770 Eastern Parkway replicas =

Replicas of the Chabad headquarters

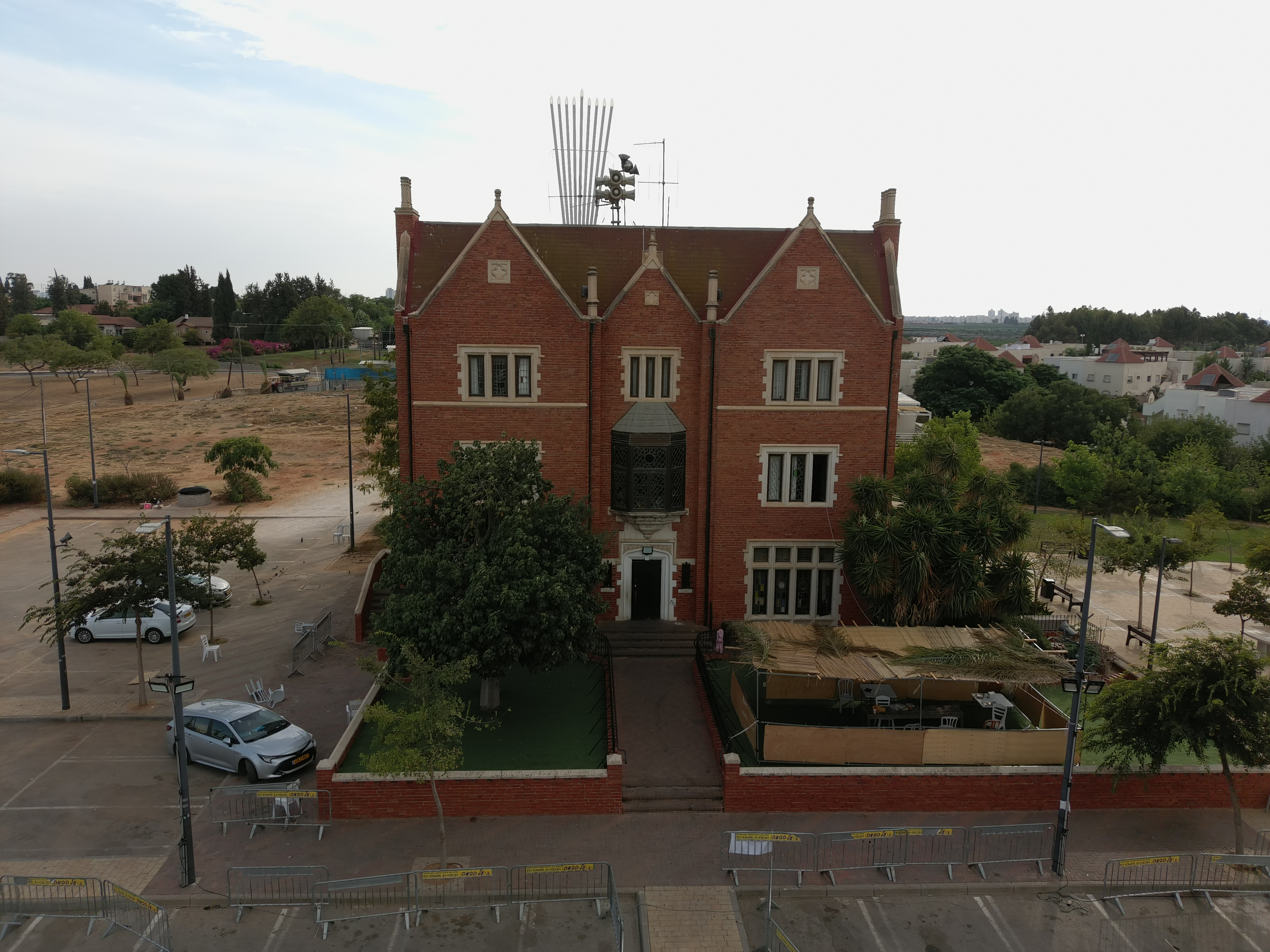
770 replica in Kfar Chabad.

770 Eastern Parkway replicas are Chabad buildings made to replicate the exterior of 770 Eastern Parkway. The first replica was built in Kfar Chabad Israel at the direction of the Rebbe. Over 55 replicas exist today based on the original building in Crown Heights, New York City. Chabad Chassidim all over the world have built replicas or near-replicas of the original gothic building, serving as Chabad Houses, synagogues, mikvas, and even a restaurant and private residences. Replica accuracy varies widely, while many include a fully accurate exterior, some include only a facade front wall and others are loosely inspired by the simple features of the building, mainly the three gables. Other replicas include Tzedakah boxes, building block sets,. The facade is also sometimes used as a design element on Tefillin and Tallit bags, and Torah and Torah ark covers and on other Judaica.

== Kfar Chabad ==
In 1985, the 7th Rebbe of Chabad, Menachem Mendel Schneerson requested that a headquarters be constructed for Agudas Chassedei Chabad of Israel in Kfar Chabad, Israel. Six months later, a cornerstone ceremony was held, for Beit Agudas Chasidei Chabad – Ohel Yosef Yitzchak Lubavitch (Hebrew: בית אגודת חסידי חב"ד, אהל יוסף יצחק ליובאוויטש) with thousands of Chabad attendees. The center was designed as an accurate replica of 770 Eastern Parkway, including the interior and the Rebbe's office. 770 in Kfar Chabad serves as the headquarters for the Chabad movement across Israel.

== List of replicas ==
List of replicas of 770 Eastern Parkway
Name	Country	Location	Address	Built	Picture
Beit Agudas Chasidei Chabad	Israel	Kfar Chabad	Ma'ale St 770, Kfar Chabad, Israel	1986	
Bais Chaya Mushka	United States	Los Angeles, California	9051 W Pico Blvd, Los Angeles, CA 90035	2004	
Chabad House of Caulfield	Australia	Victoria	439 Inkerman St, St Kilda East VIC 3183, Australia	2001	
Beit Knesset Chabad Ramat Shlomo	Israel	Ramat Shlomo, Jerusalem	HaAdmor M'Lubavich St 38, Jerusalem	2003	
770 Beit Chabad Rishon LeZion	Israel	Rishon LeZion	Mordechai Yoel Segal 3, Rishon LeZion, 7537103, Israel	2025	
Mitzpe Ramon Chabad House	Israel	Mitzpe Ramon	Nakhal Meishar St 7, Mitzpe Ramon, Israel	2023	
Chabad House of Flushing New York	United States	Flushing, Queens	77-03 Main St, Kew Gardens Hills, NY 11367	Under Construction	
Chabad West Coast Headquarters	United States	Los Angeles, California	741 Gayley Ave, Los Angeles, CA 90024		
Chabad JCC Aspen	United States	Aspen, Colorado	435 W Main St, Aspen, CO 81611		
Wellesley Weston Chabad	United States	Wellesley, Massachusetts	793 Worcester Street Wellesley, MA 02481		
Chabad Lubavitch of El Paso	United States	El Paso, Texas	6516 Escondido Dr, El Paso, TX 79912		
Chabad of Central New Jersey	United States	New Brunswick, New Jersey	170 College Ave, New Brunswick, NJ 08901		
Camp Gan Israel of Montreal	Canada	Quebec	103 Chem. de la Minerve, Labelle, QC J0T 1H0, Canada		
Beit Chabad Central	Brazil	São Paulo	R. Dr. Melo Alves, 580 - Cerqueira César, São Paulo - SP, 01417-010, Brazil		
Beit Jabad Flores	Argentina	Buenos Aires	Helguera 634, C1406APL Cdad. Autónoma de Buenos Aires, Argentina		
Casa 770	Italy	Milan	Via Carlo Poerio, 35, 20129 Milano MI, Italy		
Beit Hakneset Chabad Migdal HaEmek	Israel	Migdal HaEmek	Zevulun St 76, Migdal HaEmek, Israel		
Pisgat Ze'ev Chabad House	Israel	Pisgat Ze'ev, Jerusalem	Moshe Dayan 68, Jerusalem		
Chabad of Illinois Headquarters	United States	Chicago Illinois	2833 W Howard Street, Chicago, IL 60645		
Chabad Jewish Center of Tacoma	United States	Tacoma, Washington	2146 N Mildred St, Tacoma, WA 98406	2012	
Maasim Tovim Center	Israel	Afula	Yitshak Rabin Boulevard 18, Afula, Israel		
Yeshivas Lubavitch Cincinnati	United States	Cincinnati, Ohio	1863 Section Rd, Cincinnati, OH 45237		
Ofakim Chabad House	Israel	Ofakim		Under Construction	
Shlomi Chabad Center	Israel	Shlomi	HaRav Maimon St 49	Under Construction	
Beitar Chabad Center	Israel	Beitar Illit			
Beitar Chabad Synagogue	Israel	Beitar Illit			
Kikar HaShluchim 770 Model	Israel	Beitar Illit			
Yeshivas Lubavitch of Baltimore	United States	Baltimore, Maryland	6702 Park Heights Ave, Baltimore, MD 21215	2023	
Chabad of Kiryat Ata	Israel	Kiryat Ata	HaHistadrut Avenue 248, Kiryat Ata, 28000 Israel		
Chabad House at UCLA	United States	Los Angeles, California	741 Gayley Ave, Los Angeles, CA 90024		
Beit Hakneset 770 Zichron Yaakov	Israel	Zikhron Ya'akov	Khasida St, Zikhron Ya'akov, Israel	2008	
Chabad House of Kiryat Arba	Israel	Kiryat Arba	Kiryat Arba 26/9, Hebron, 90100 Israel	2012	
Shaarei Geula Synagogue	Israel	Kiryat Gat	Ge'on ha-Yarden St 19, Kiryat Gat, Israel		
Chabad of Bet She'an	Israel	Beit She'an			
Chabad Center of Sderot	Israel	Sderot	Simtat Khativat Giv'ati 11, Sderot, 80100 Israel		
Waxman Chabad Center	United States	Cleveland, Ohio	2479 S Green Rd, Beachwood, OH 44122	2006	
Chabad at Miami University	United States	Oxford, Ohio	111 East Spring Street, Oxford, Ohio 45056	2020	
Beit Baruch Jewish Community Center	Ukraine	Kamianske	Arsenecheva 5, Dneprodzerzhinsk, 51925 Ukraine	2008	
Bronnaya Synagogue Agudas Chasidei Chabad	Russia	Ramenskoye, Moscow Oblast		2009	
Jabad Lubavitch de Chile	Chile	Santiago	1575 Los Cactus La Dehesa, Santiago, Chile	2007	
Nachum Restaurant	Israel	Kfar Chabad	Tzeria Agudat Chabad St, Kfar Habad, 6084000, Israel		
Chabad House Of Dharamkot	India	Dharamkot, Himachal Pradesh	Kangra Rd, Dharamshala, Himachal Pradesh 176216, India		
Chabad Jewish Center Manila Philippines	Philippines	Manila	2862 E Zobel, Makati City, 1210 Metro Manila, Philippines		
Lefferts Shul	United States	Brooklyn, New York	672 Lefferts Ave, Brooklyn, NY 11203		
Beth Loubavitch Menahem Mendel	France	Romainville	18 Rue Alexandre Dumas, Romainville, 93230 France		
Beth Loubavitch St Brice	France	Saint-Brice-sous-Forêt	30 Allée du Professeur Dubos, St-Brice-Sous-Forêt, 95350 France		
Moshiach Center 770	United States	Lauderhill, Florida	4538 Inverrary Blvd, Lauderhill, FL 33319	Under Construction	
The Rohr Chabad Jewish Center at Towson	United States	Towson, Maryland	14 Aigburth Rd, Towson, MD 21286		
Post Office at Gan Yisroel Parksville	United States	Parksville, New York	487 Parksville Rd, Parksville, NY 12768		
Rohr Chabad House at The University of Virginia	United States	Charlottesville, Virginia	2014 Lewis Mountain Rd, Charlottesville, VA 22903		
Private Residence of the Nuama family	Israel	Itamar			
Private Residence of Rabbi Nes Carmon	Israel	Gedera			
Yeshivas Lubavitch Manchester	England	Manchester	62 Singleton RD	Planned	
Chabad Lubavitch of Nigeria	Nigeria	Abuja		Under Construction	
Tefarat Eliezer Synagogue	Israel	Nahalal		Under Construction	
Chabad of Springfield	United States	Springfield, Illinois		Planned	
770 in Herzliya	Israel	Herzliya		Planned	
The Chabad Jewish Community Center of Placer County	United States	Placer County		Planned	
