= Noah's Ark replicas and derivatives =

Numerous interpretations of Noah's Ark have been built and proposed. Some were intended to be replicas, as close as possible to the Biblical Ark, the builders assuming that such a boat did exist and that it is not a mythological vessel. Others are looser derivatives which were inspired by the idea. The Biblical description of the Ark is brief, beyond the basic measures of length, height and width, and the exact design of any "replica" must largely be a matter of conjecture. Some interpret the Ark as simply a chest-like structure with rectangular sides; other reconstructions (like Ark Encounter) give it a rounded bow and stern.

== Full-scale ==
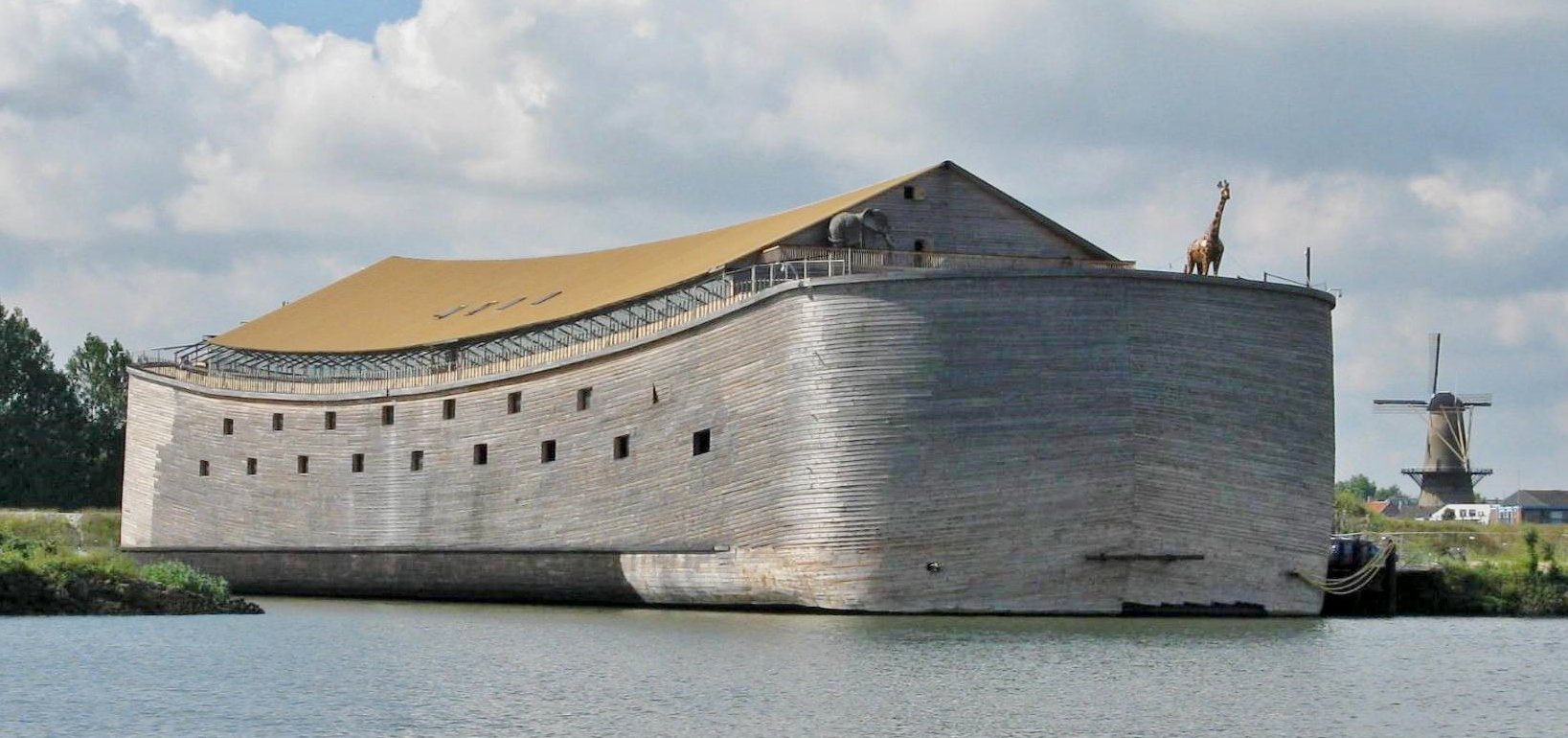
Full size interpretation of Noah's Ark in Dordrecht, Netherlands

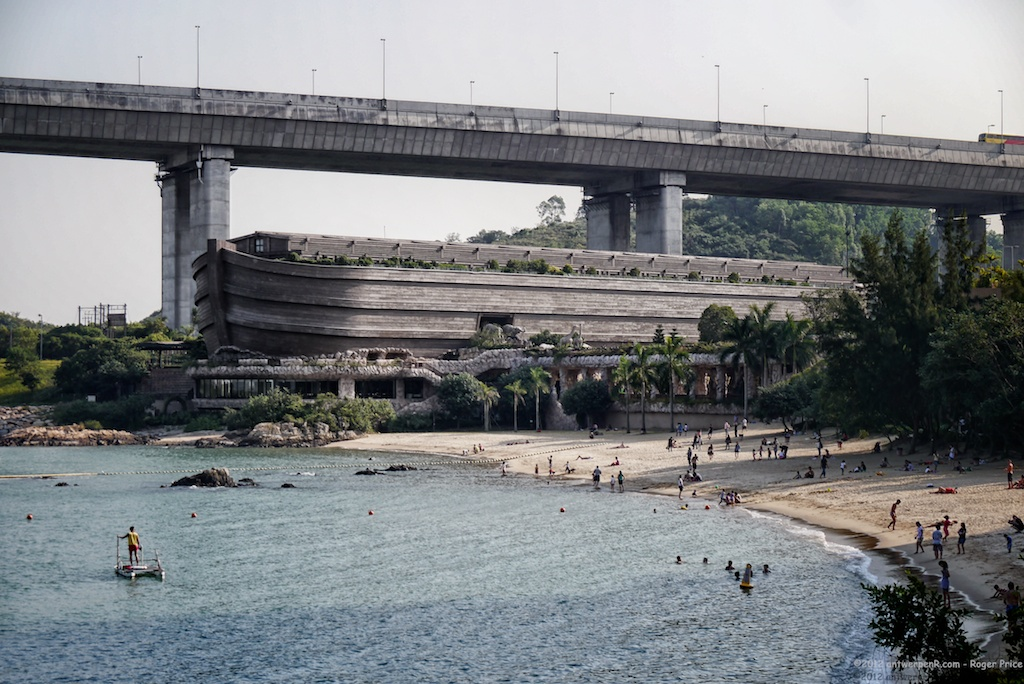
Noah's Ark at Tsing Ma Bridge in Hong Kong

The Bible gives the length of the ark as 300 cubits. Various cubits were in use in antiquity, but to be considered "full-scale", an Ark replica would have to be somewhere in the range from about 135 to upward of 150 meters long (ca. 440 to 500+ feet).

- Johan's Ark in Dordrecht, Netherlands. 137 meters (449 feet) long and carried on a platform made up of 25 LASH barges, this is the only full-scale Ark interpretation that is actually floating and mobile.
- Noah's Ark theme park at Ma Wan Island, Hong Kong. This interpretation is also 137 meters (449 feet) long.
- Ark Encounter theme park located on a hill in Grant County, Kentucky, United States. It is 155 meters (509 feet) long.

== Reduced-scale ==
- Half-scale ark built by Johan Huibers in 2004.
- 2/3-scale model in Florenceville, New Brunswick, Canada.
- Greenpeace built a 10x4x4 meter replica ark on Mount Ararat in 2007 to warn about "impending climate disaster". It was later relocated to the town of Iğdır.
- Cement-and-iron replica, 60 by 4.5 meters (197 by 15 ft), in park operated by Freud de Melo in Hidrolândia, Goiás, Brazil.
- Reduced-scale model in the Creation Evidence Museum, near Glen Rose, Texas.
- Reduced-scale building at Redwood Christian Park in the Santa Cruz mountains.
- Finkel's replica of Babylonian ark One-third scale boat based on specification in Epic of Gilgamesh
- 1/50 scale model of Noah's Ark, commissioned by the Korea Association for Creation Research and produced in 1993 by the Maritime Research Institute of South Korea

== Partial ==
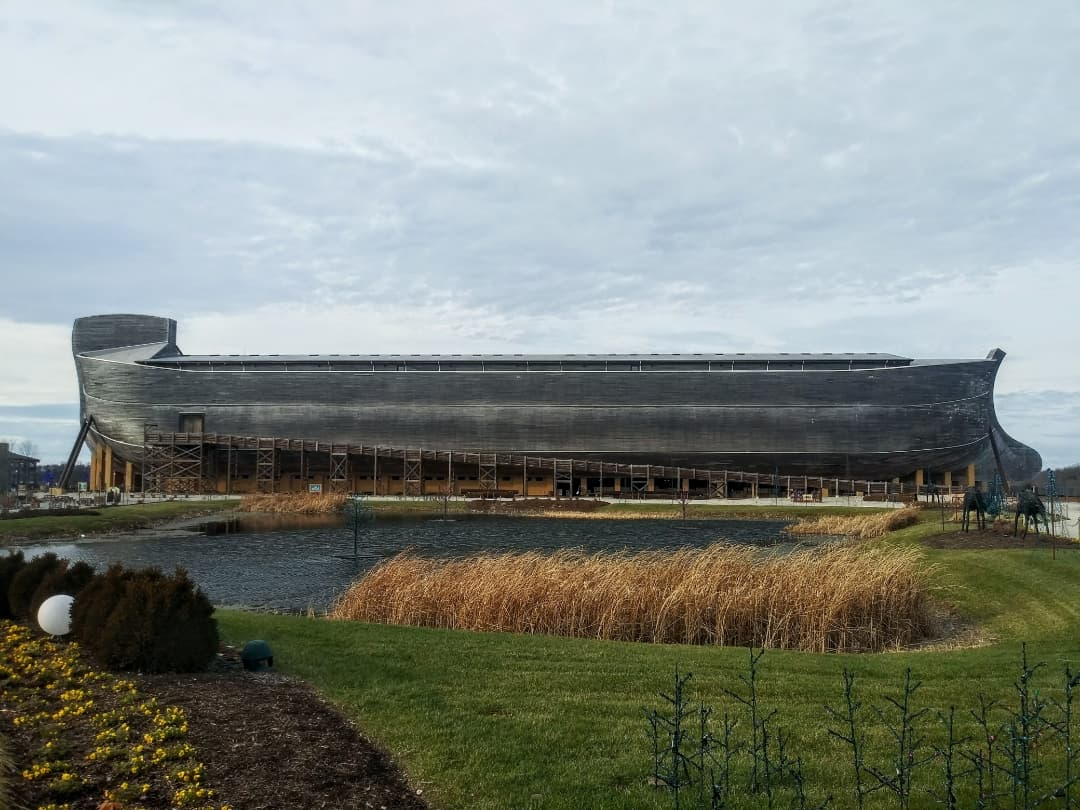
Noah's Ark at the Ark Encounter in Kentucky

- Replicas of portions of the ark at the Creation Museum (Petersburg, Kentucky) and in a warehouse nearby.
- Partial replica built for filming the 2014 movie Noah (Oyster Bay, Long Island)
- God's Ark of Safety, partially built. On a hilltop along Interstate 68 in Frostburg, Maryland.

== Defunct ==
- A reduced-scale replica was built as a set for the 2007 film Evan Almighty in Virginia and then disassembled.
- Noah's Ark Restaurant, St. Charles, Missouri, United States — Ark-shaped restaurant, torn down in 2007.

== See also ==
- Lists of replicas
