= Lists of replicas =

This is a list of lists of replicas of various specific objects.

- List of Eiffel Tower replicas
- Independence Hall replicas
- Replicas of the Jewish Temple
- Replicas of Michelangelo's David
- Replicas of Michelangelo's Pietà
- Mona Lisa replicas and reinterpretations
- Monticello replicas
- List of replicas of Noah's Ark
- 770 Eastern Parkway replicas
- Replicas of the Statue of Liberty
- Stonehenge replicas and derivatives
- Replicas of the White House
