= New York City synagogue tunnel incident =

2024 incident in Brooklyn, New York

Coordinates: 40°40′08″N 73°56′34″W

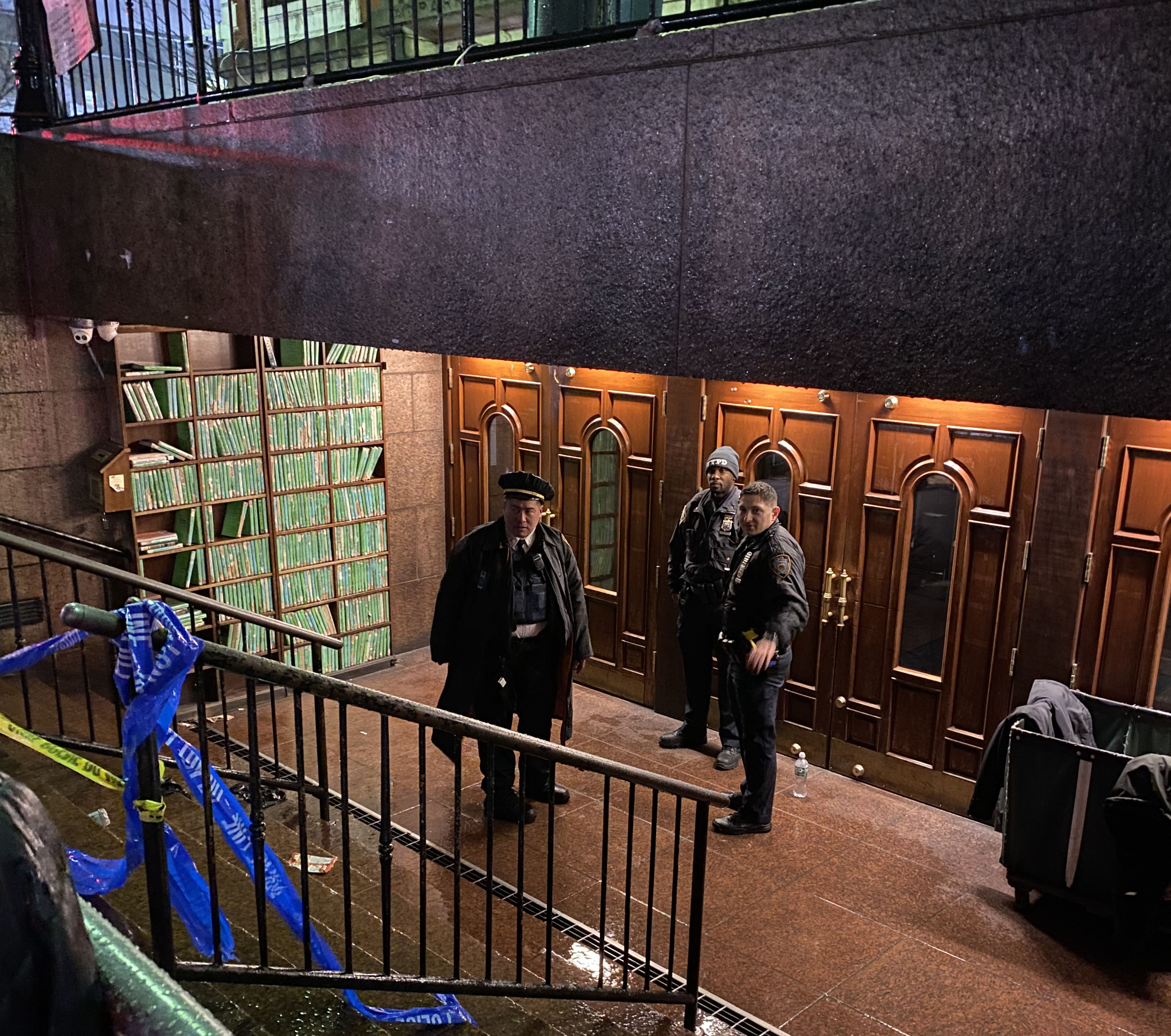
NYPD officers at the entrance to the synagogue

On January 8, 2024, clashes broke out at the World Headquarters of the Chabad-Lubavitch movement in Crown Heights, Brooklyn, after construction workers hired by the synagogue's leaders attempted to fill in a tunnel that yeshiva students had illegally dug beneath the building. The New York City Police Department was called to intervene and arrested twelve people.

== Background ==
The World Headquarters of the Chabad-Lubavitch movement are located at 770 Eastern Parkway in Crown Heights, Brooklyn, and are often referred to simply as "770". Originally confined to 770 Eastern Parkway, the synagogue underwent multiple expansions during the leadership of the Lubavitcher Rebbe, Rabbi Menachem Mendel Schneerson, eventually extending to include the basements beneath 784 and 788 Eastern Parkway, where the main synagogue hall is now located.

The Lubavitcher Rebbe himself spoke of the importance of expanding 770 and personally laid the cornerstone of an expansion project on August 30, 1988.

The synagogue has been the subject of a dispute between the Agudas Chasidei Chabad (the umbrella organization for the worldwide Chabad-Lubavitch movement) and the gabbaim, who are associated with Chabad messianism and control the day-to-day operations of the main synagogue. Though a 2006 court ruling assigned full ownership of 770 to Agudas Chasidei Chabad, ongoing legal disputes have prevented either party from altering the structure.

A campaign to enlarge the synagogue, called "Expand 770", was launched in 2022. The campaign aimed to rally support for the synagogue expansion. The campaign founder stated that there is a "need and duty to expand and broaden" the synagogue due to lack of space.

== Tunnel construction and discovery ==
The New York City Fire Department received an anonymous tip about 770 in mid-December 2023. They made an inspection of the building on December 20, but did not find the tunnel. The existence of the tunnel was first reported on by local media on December 22.

The tunnel was constructed by yeshiva students as part of an attempt to illegally expand 770, a process that has been delayed due to various legal disputes involving the building. Two yeshiva students involved with the creation of the tunnel spoke with The Forward, claiming that they were "taking initiative on a long-deferred synagogue expansion".

A New York City Department of Buildings investigation in January determined that the tunnel was "illegally excavated" and connected four neighboring buildings: 784 and 786 Eastern Parkway, 302 Kingston Avenue, and the extension behind 1457 Union Street. The tunnel was approximately 60 ft (18 m) long, 8 ft (2.4 m) wide, and 5 ft (1.5 m) tall, with inadequate shoring. A full vacate order was issued for the abandoned men's mikvah at 302 Kingston Avenue due to foundation damage.

After the discovery of the tunnel, the gabbaim called in construction crews to fill the tunnel with concrete.

== Incident ==
On the afternoon of January 8, 2024, a group of yeshiva students, reported to be Chabad messianics, attempted to protect the hidden passageways after a cement truck arrived to fill the tunnel. The men were seen tearing up wood paneling and throwing wooden pews while others ran into the tunnel to stop it from being filled. The New York City Police Department responded after receiving reports of a "disorderly group" outside the building.

Many refused to come out of the tunnel, and as a result, police arrested nine people. Those arrested were between the ages of 19 and 22. Of those arrested, five were later arraigned in front of a Brooklyn judge on charges including criminal mischief, reckless endangerment, and obstructing governmental administration. The five men, who were described by their lawyer as being Israeli citizens studying to become rabbis, all pleaded not guilty and were released without bail until a future court date. Seven other individuals were given summonses on lesser charges. In April 2024, thirteen men were arraigned on charges relating to the incident. Six defendants subsequently pleaded guilty. On October 31, thirteen Israelis, aged between 18 to 21 years old, were indicted by a New York court for their involvement in digging the tunnel and ordered nine of the accused passports to be confiscated. Six more defendants accepted a plea bargain in January 2025, while four defendants refused to accept a plea deal and were set to be tried in April 2025.

== Aftermath ==
Rabbi Motti Seligson, Chabad's media director, said in a statement that the incident was "deeply distressing to the Lubavitch movement, and the Jewish community worldwide". Seligson also characterized those that had created the tunnel as a "group of extremist students". Rabbi Yehuda Krinsky, chairman of the Chabad-Lubavitch movement, released a statement thanking the NYPD and stating that the actions of the students "will be investigated, and the sanctity of the synagogue will be restored". The building was temporarily closed pending a structural safety review, and three other buildings had to be vacated as well. Court papers indicated that the students had caused up to $1,500 in damage. The tunnel was infilled with concrete on January 10.

Residents of Crown Heights had varying responses to the incident, with some labelling the students a "small fringe group" and others expressing support for their expansion project.

Footage of the January 8 incident and tunnel went viral, especially on Twitter. Videos depicted a riot inside and people emerging from sidewalk grates and into the street. In other forums such as 4chan and QAnon Telegram pages, stills taken from videos of the synagogue's interior as well as the room leading to the tunnel, which showed a stained mattress and high chair, respectively, fueled antisemitic conspiracy theories.

Fact-checking organizations noted that many conspiracy theories circulating online focused on a stained mattress visible in videos of the January 8 incident, with claims alleging that it had been found inside the tunnel. A USA Today fact-check stated that the stained mattress seen in viral videos had been removed from behind wood paneling of the synagogue rather than from the tunnel itself, undermining online speculation that the mattresses were in the tunnel. Additional fact-checks from organizations such as FactCheck.org and AFP likewise found no evidence supporting claims that the tunnel or its contents were connected to any illicit activity.
