= God's Ark of Safety =

Christian ministry

Coordinates: 39.633952°N 78.929622°W

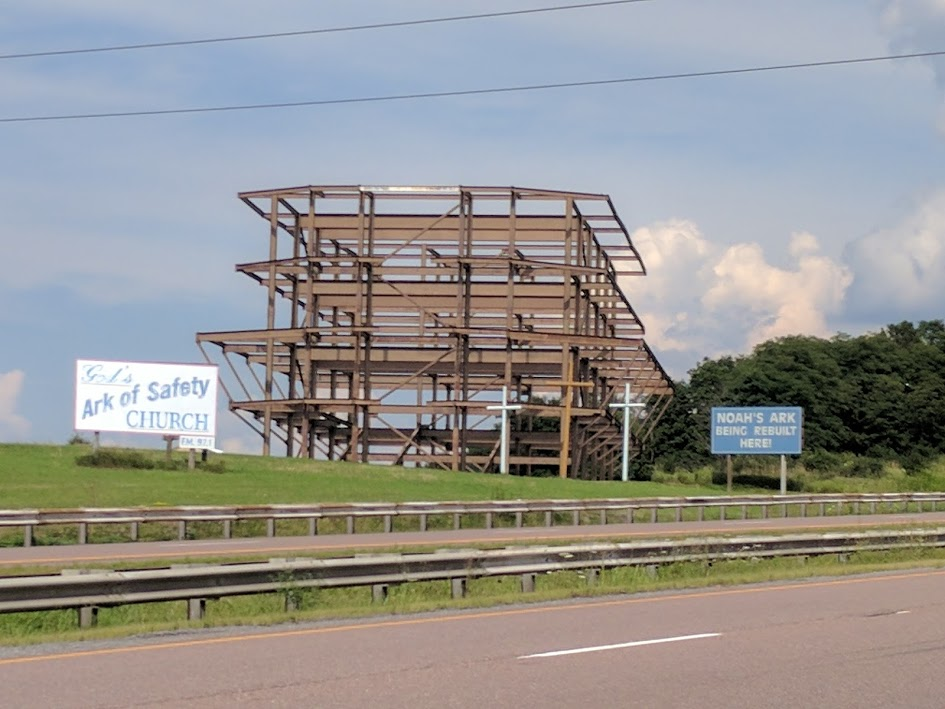
God's Ark of Safety, a non-denominational Christian ministry near Frostburg, Allegany County, Maryland

God's Ark of Safety is a non-denominational Christian ministry in Frostburg, Maryland, United States, led by Pastor Everett Spence. On Easter, 1976, former Pastor Richard Greene began building a replica of Noah's Ark atop a hillside along what is now Interstate 68 featuring a sign that announces to passing travelers: "Noah's Ark Being Rebuilt Here!" Ground was broken for the ark in September 1976 with over 3,000 tons of concrete. The foundation and earthwork were built to biblical proportions, around 450 by 75 by 45 feet, which is about one and a half football fields long.

As of January 2026, the structure is still just a frame.

The Ark is featured on the front cover and chapter 4 of Timothy Beal's book Roadside Religion: In Search of the Sacred, the Strange, and the Substance of Faith. In the book Scrambled Eggs at Midnight by Frostburg writer Brad Barkley, there is a reference to the Ark in the pre-chapter section listing places that one should see when traveling across the country. It is also mentioned in Barkley's story "The Way It's Lasted."

== See also ==
- Flood myth and List of flood myths
- Noah's Ark replicas and derivatives
