= Irving Finkel =

English philologist and Assyriologist (born 1951)

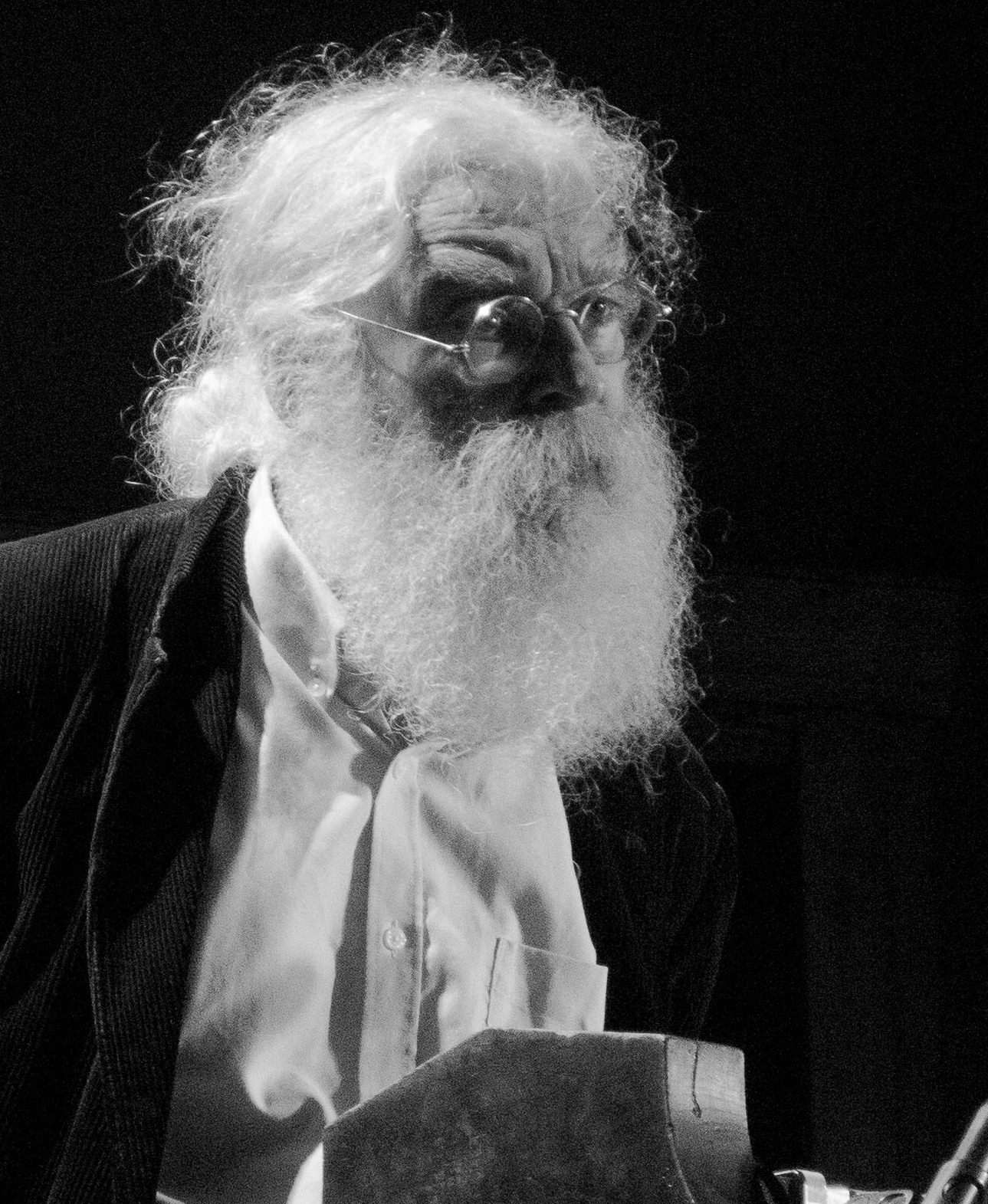
- Finkel in 2015
- Born: Irving Leonard Finkel; 1951 (age 74–75)
- Known for: Discovery of tablet with Great Flood narrative suggesting a coracle-shaped ark, Reconstruction of the Royal Game of Ur
- Spouse: Joanna Finkel (née Zakiewicz)
- Children: 5

Academic background
- Education: University of Birmingham (PhD)
- Thesis: Ḫulbazizi: ancient Mesopotanian exorcistic incantations (1976)
- Doctoral advisor: Wilfred G. Lambert

Academic work
- Discipline: Philology, Assyriology
- Institutions: Oriental Institute (Chicago); British Museum

Irving Leonard Finkel (born 1951) is an English philologist and Assyriologist. He is the Assistant Keeper of Ancient Mesopotamian script, languages and cultures in the Department of the Middle East in the British Museum, where he specialises in cuneiform inscriptions on tablets of clay from ancient Mesopotamia.

== Early life and education ==
Finkel was born in 1951 to a dentist father and teacher mother, one of five children, and grew up at Palmers Green, North London. He was raised as an Orthodox Jew, but became an atheist as a teenager. He earned a PhD in Assyriology from the University of Birmingham under the supervision of Wilfred G. Lambert with a dissertation on Babylonian exorcistic spells against demons.

== Career ==
=== Philology ===
Finkel spent three years as a Research Fellow at the University of Chicago Oriental Institute. In 1976 he returned to the UK, and was appointed Assistant Keeper in the Department of Western Asiatic Antiquities at the British Museum, where he was (and remains) responsible for curating, reading and translating the museum's collection of around 130,000 cuneiform tablets.

In 2014, Finkel's study of a cuneiform tablet that contained a flood narrative similar to that of the story of Noah's Ark, described in his book The Ark Before Noah, was widely reported in the news media. The ark described in the tablet was circular, essentially a very large coracle or kuphar and made of rope on a wooden frame. The tablet included sufficient details of its dimensions and construction to enable a copy of the ark to be made at about 1/3 scale, as documented in a 2014 TV documentary Secrets of Noah's Ark that aired as an episode of PBS's NOVA series. The reconstructed ark was floated with partial success given that the bitumen used as sealant for the vessel walls immediately succumbed to leaks and a petrol powered pump had to continuously be used to pump out water.

=== Board games ===
Finkel studies the history of board games, and is on the editorial board of Board Game Studies. Among his breakthrough works is the determination of the rules of the Royal Game of Ur. His personal replica set of the Lewis chessmen was used as a prop in the first Harry Potter film.

=== Great Diary Project ===
Finkel founded the Great Diary Project, a project to preserve the diaries of ordinary people. In association with the Bishopsgate Institute, Finkel has helped to archive over 2,000 personal diaries. In 2014, the V&A Museum of Childhood held an exhibition of the diaries of children written between 1813 and 1996.

=== Literary ===
Finkel has written a number of works of fiction for children.

He appeared in the 2014 memoir The Boy in the Book by Nathan Penlington.

== Personal life ==
Finkel lives in southeast London with his wife Joanna Finkel (née Zakiewicz) and has five children.

== Selected publications ==
=== Academic ===
- ———; Reade, Julian Edgeworth (2002). "On some inscribed Babylonian alabastra". Journal of the Royal Asiatic Society. 12 (1): 31–46.
- ——— (2003). "Pachisi in Arab Garb". Board Games Studies. 5: 65–78.
- ——— (2005). "Explanatory Commentary on a List of Materia Medica". In Spar, I.; Lambert, W.G. (eds.). Cuneiform Inscriptions in the Metropolitan Museum. New York. pp. 279–83.
- ——— (2005). "Documents of the Physician and Magician". In Spar, I.; Lambert, W.G. (eds.). Cuneiform Inscriptions in the Metropolitan Museum. New York. pp. 155–76.
- ———. "Report on the Sidon Cuneiform tablet". Archaeology & History in Lebanon. 24 (Autumn 2006): 114–20.
- ———; Geller, M.J., eds. (2007). The Wellcome Conference on Babylonian Medicine. Styx.
- ———, ed. (2008). Ancient Board Games in Perspective: Papers from the 1990 British Museum colloquium with additional contributions. London: British Museum.
- ——— (2014). The Ark Before Noah: Decoding the Story of the Flood. Hodder & Stoughton. ISBN 978-1-4447-5705-7.
- ———; Taylor, Jonathan (2015). Cuneiform: Ancient Scripts. J. Paul Getty Museum. ISBN 978-1-60606-447-4.
- ——— (2021). The First Ghosts: Most Ancient of Legacies. Hodder & Stoughton. ISBN 978-1-5293-0329-2.

=== Fiction ===
- ——— (2007). The Last Resort Library. Kennedy & Boyd. ISBN 978-1-904999-41-6.
- ——— (2008). The Princess Who Wouldn't Come Home. Kennedy & Boyd. ISBN 978-1-904999-80-5.
- ——— (2010). Swizzle de Brax and the Blungaphone. Kennedy & Boyd. ISBN 978-1-84921-082-9.
- ——— (2012). Miss Barbellion's Garden. Kennedy & Boyd. ISBN 978-1-84921-071-3.
- ——— (2018). The Writing in the Stone. Medina Publishing. ISBN 978-1-909339-95-8.

=== For children ===
- The Lifeboat that Saved the World (Thames and Hudson, 2017) ISBN 978-0-500-65122-3
