= Library of Agudas Chassidei Chabad =

Research library at the headquarters of the Chabad movement of Hasidic Judaism

Library Of Agudas Chassidei Chabad
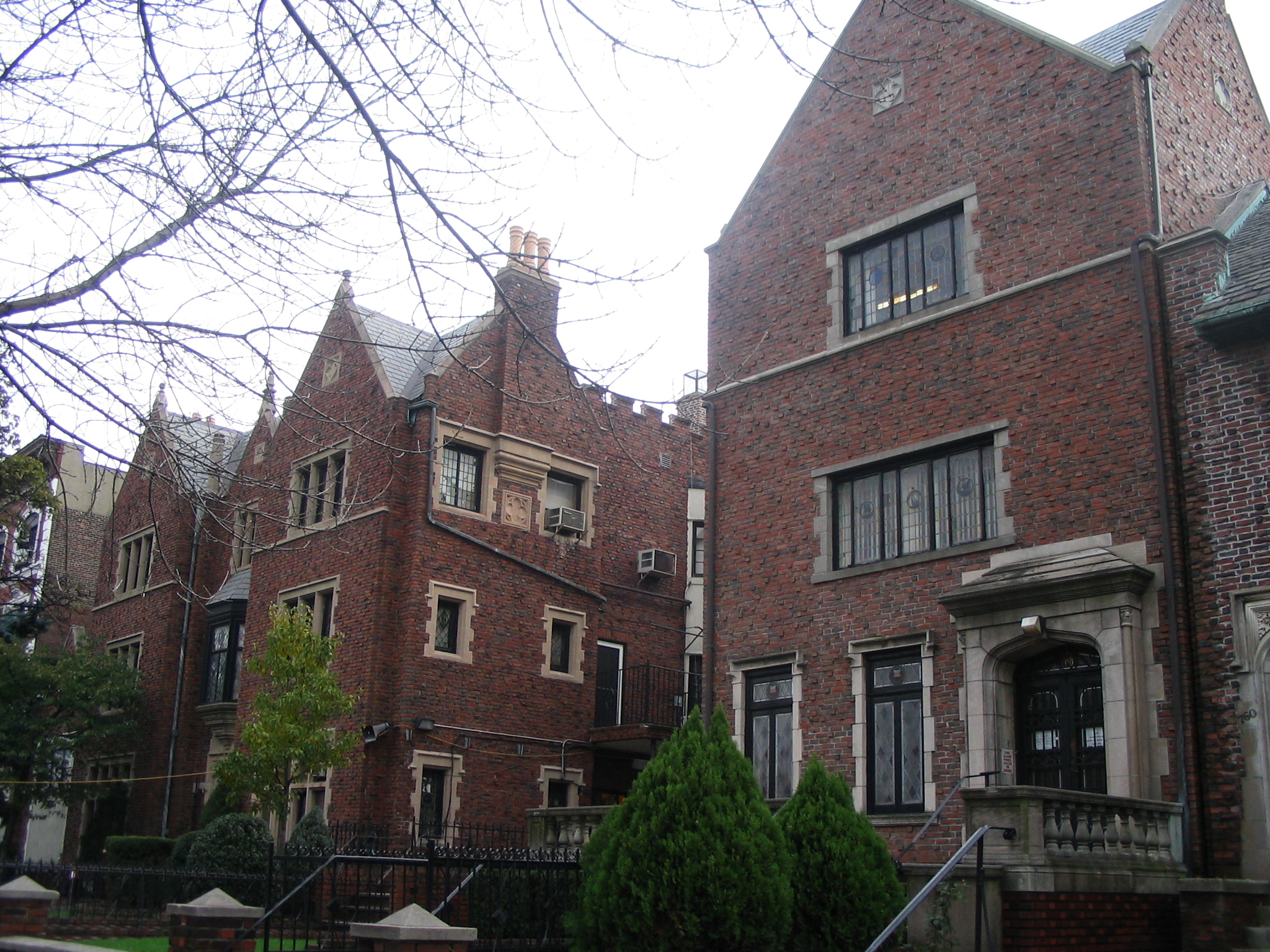
- Type: Research library in Brooklyn, NY, owned by Agudas Chasidei Chabad
- Established: 1940

Collection
- Items collected: books, letters, e-books, music, cds, periodicals, maps, genealogical archives, business directories, local history,
- Size: 250,000 books
- Criteria for collection: Jewish literature, history,

Other information
- Website: Chabad Library Website

The Library Of Agudas Chassidei Chabad (also Chabad Library or Lubavitch library) is a research library owned by Agudas Chasidei Chabad whose content was collected by the rebbes (hereditary rabbinical dynastic leaders) of Chabad-Lubavitch. The library is housed next to the Lubavitch world headquarters at 770 Eastern Parkway in Brooklyn, New York, and is utilized by Chabad and general Judaic scholars. It is viewed by thousands of visitors each year.

The library contains more than 100,000 letters, artifacts, and pictures belonging to, written by and for the rebbes of Chabad and their Hasidim complete the collection. Notable among the collection is the siddur of the Baal Shem Tov, which is kept in a locked safe and is only handled by the head librarian.

== History ==
Following a court case regarding ownership of the library in 1987, it greatly expanded. In 1992 it opened its reading room, and exhibition hall in 1994.

Throughout the history of the Chabad movement, a central collection of books and manuscripts was in the possession of the Rebbe of every generation. In earlier generations—at the end of 18th century and in the early 19th century—this collection was relatively small. Little remains of the original collections, for almost all books and manuscripts were either destroyed in the frequent fires plaguing small towns in those days or were lost in various other upheavals and crisis situations over the generations. The bulk of the existing collection began to form in the third generation of Chabad—during the mid-19th century—and progressively expanded over time to become one of the world's most prominent Judaic libraries. Most of the collections of the first and second Chabad Rebbe's were lost or destroyed. During Chabad's third generation, under Rabbi Menachem Mendel Schneersohn (1789–1866), known for his major Talmudic-Halachic work, Tzemach Tzedek, a more substantial collection took form. It became the nucleus of the central Chabad collection, which continued to grow during the following generations.

The library is divided into three main sections: The Lubavitch Collection, The Collection of Rabbi Yosef Yitzchak Schneersohn, and The Collection of Rabbi Menachem Mendel Schneerson.

=== The Lubavitch/Schneerson Collection ===
The Lubavitch/Schneerson Collection consists of about 12,000 books and 50,000 religious documents and manuscripts from, and which belonged to, the first Chabad Rebbes starting with Rabbi Schneur Zalman, until Rabbi Sholom Dovber Schneersohn. In fall, 1915, as German forces approached, Rabbi Sholom Dovber and his family were forced to leave Lubavitch. He moved to Rostov, in south Russia. He sent most of his collection to Moscow for safekeeping, planning to retrieve it after the war. In 1920, however, he died in Rostov, before the end of the Russian Civil War that followed World War I. As peace gradually returned to the land, his son and successor Rabbi Yosef Yitzchak finally had an opportunity to request the return of the collection. The new Soviet regime, however, nationalized the warehouse and gave the Lubavitch Collection to the Russian State Library. Only about 100 of the collections volumes had accompanied Rabbi Shalom Dovber and Rabbi Yosef Yitzchak to Rostov—for study or because of sentimental value—and these accompanied Rabbi Yosef Yitzchak on all his later wanderings, to Leningrad, Riga, Warsaw, Otwock, and Brooklyn. Today they are held in a special bookcase in the Chabad Library. During the years following, Rabbi Yosef Yitzchak attempted through various means to seek the release of his original library, but was unsuccessful.

=== The Collection of Rabbi Yosef Yitzchak Schneersohn ===
When the Lubavitch collection was confiscated in 1924 and given to the new Russian State Library, Rabbi Yosef Yitzchak began to rebuild his library anew. He started by acquiring the entire collection of Samuel Winer, a bibliographer and collector of rare books whose personal collection comprised about 5,000 valuable, antique and rare volumes, scrolls, marriage contracts, and the like. Yosef Yitzchak continued to expand and supplement his library by acquiring volumes of Judaica and Hebraica of all kinds. When World War II began in 1939, Yosef Yitzchak escaped Nazi-occupied Poland and along with his family and some members of his secretariat, arrived in New York City. The library, however, remained in Poland. It took a year and a half for his tireless efforts to succeed in getting the library transported to New York from Europe, at the end of 1941.

=== The Collection of Rabbi Menachem Mendel Schneerson ===
After his arrival to New York in 1941, Rabbi Menachem Mendel Schneerson established a library for the purpose of serving the needs of the Merkos L'Inyonei Chinuch. A year after Yosef Yitzchak's death in 1950, Menachem Mendel became the seventh Rebbe. He continued to expand his new library, and in 1967 acquired the building adjacent to his office, for the purpose of housing the sizable collection. Two distinct libraries were now maintained at Lubavitch World Headquarters between 1968 and 1985—the Collection of Rabbi Yosef Yitzchak on the ground floor, and Menachem Mendel's collection in the annex.

=== "Hey Teves" lawsuit ===
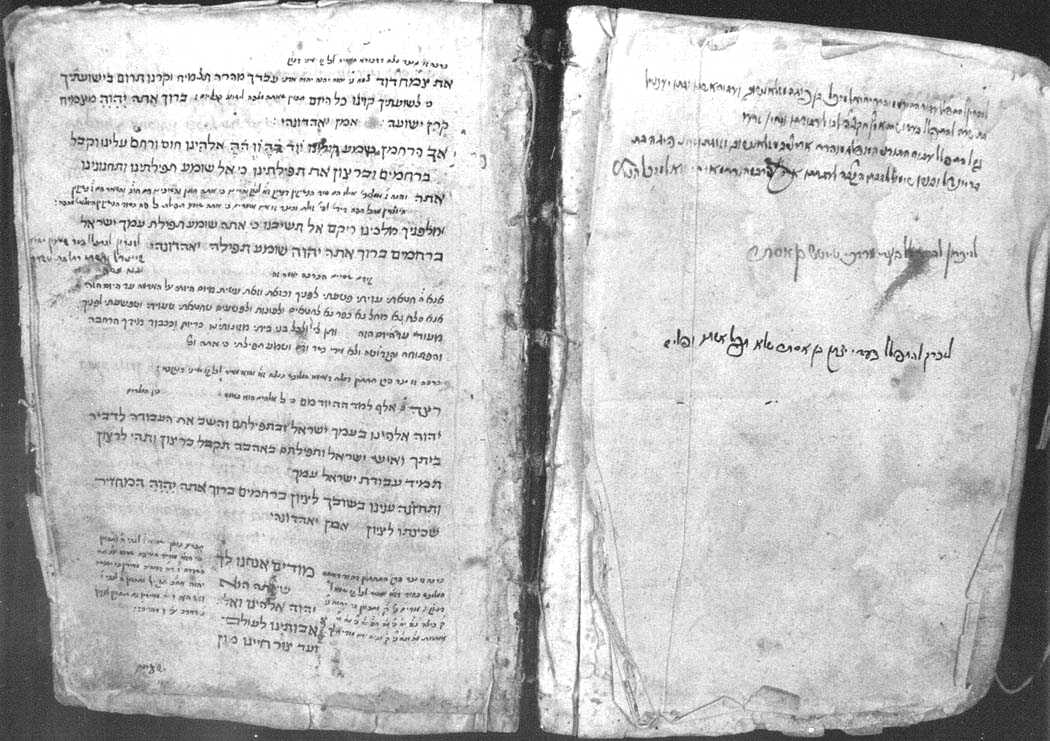
The Baal Shem Tov siddur (archive #1994)

The ownership of the Chabad Library was the subject of a dispute which ultimately led to the filing of a civil lawsuit, resulting in the ruling that the Chabad-Lubavitch movement, represented by Agudas Chasidei Chabad, were the rightful owners of the Chabad Library.

The dispute occurred when Barry Gurary, the grandson of Yosef Yitzchak Schneersohn (the sixth Chabad Rebbe), removed books from the Chabad Library and began selling them for personal profit. Gurary claimed the books as part of his inheritance from his late grandfather. According to Gurary, the Chabad Library belonged to his grandfather's estate. Barry Gurary clandestinely removed numerous Jewish books, including a first edition Passover haggadah worth over $50,000, and began selling the books. One illuminated Passover Haggadah dating back to 1757 was sold for $69,000 to a Swiss book dealer who soon found a private buyer to pay nearly $150,000 for it.

Following the directives of Rabbi Menachem Mendel Schneerson (the seventh Chabad Rebbe), the Agudas Chasidei Chabad, the Chabad movement's central organization, filed a civil lawsuit to prevent Gurary from removing or selling any additional books. On legal advice, the Lubavitch Library obtained a temporary restraining order in the hope that this would resolve the matter. Agudas Chasidei Chabad later filed suit to retrieve the books. The Chabad movement argued that the library was the "communal property" of the Lubavitch Hasidim and not the "personal possessions" of the late Rebbe. They cited a letter written by the Rebbe himself, supporting this notion.

In 1986, the court ruled in favor of Agudas Chassidei Chabad, and that ruling was upheld on appeal in 1987. The volumes were returned to the library. In the Chabad community, the ruling is celebrated on the Fifth of Teves; the day is called "Didan Notzach" ("ours won").

=== Schneerson collection controversy ===
When Sholom Dovber and Yosef Yitzchak left Russia and Europe, an estimated 10,000 volumes from their collection remained behind. Since the war it has been stored in the Russian State Library. In 2010 Chabad filed suit against the Russian Library in an attempt to retrieve its collection. On July 30, 2010, Royce C. Lamberth, a federal judge of the United States District Court in Washington, ruled in favor of the Chabad organization, ordering Russia to turn over all Schneerson documents held at the Russian State Library, the Russian State Military Archive and elsewhere, and ordered fines of $50,000 a day for failing to send the rest of the collection to the United States.

Russia says the collection is a national treasure of the Russian people, since Rabbi Schneersohn had no heirs. A Russian court ordered the Library of Congress to pay fines of $50,000 a day for holding the books they borrowed in 1994.
