= Finkel's replica of Babylonian ark =

Historical reconstruction

A one-third scale replica of a Babylonian "ark" was constructed in 2014 by Irving Finkel, based on tablets from the Epic of Gilgamesh.

== Gilgamesh tablets ==
In 2009. the Deputy Keeper of the Middle East at the British Museum, Irving Finkel, made a study of a cuneiform tablet from 1750 BCE that contained a flood narrative similar to that of the story of Noah's Ark. The fact that these versions of the Flood Story precede the Biblical version with the one God and Noah by a thousand years caused a sensation in 1872 when British Museum Assyriologist George Smith announced he had found the first cuneiform account of the Great Flood. Dr. Finkel first encountered a recently discovered small cuneiform tablet in 1985, which was one of several pieces brought to the British Museum for expert assessment. Several versions of the Epic of Gilgamesh were already known. The earliest surviving tablets date to the 18th century BCE and are named after its hero, Atra-Hasis. Finkel was able to read the clean first verses of the tablet, famous among Assyriologists as the opening lines of the Atra-Hasis Flood Story. He was unable to gain access to translate the whole tablet until 2009.

Sixty lines of the Ark Tablet go into great detail on the design of the boat and the materials, including sufficient details of its dimensions and construction to enable a copy to be attempted. The tablet describes essentially a very large coracle or kuphar, made of rope on a wooden frame. The design was effectively a very large scale version of coracles used until the mid-twentieth century in Iraq. However, the quantities specified were enormous. In Ancient Mesopotamian units of measurement, the tablet described a boat with the area of 1 field, sides 1 nindan high, and requiring 14,430 sutu of palm fibre rope for its construction. That is enough palm-fibre rope, wooden ribs and stanchions to build a coracle 3,600 square meters (39,000 sq ft) in area, almost two-thirds the size of a soccer field, with walls 6 meters (20 ft) high. If the amount of rope described were laid out in a single line, it would be 500 km (310 mi) long. Because the hull was to be made of fibrous rope, bitumen was specified in the tablet to waterproof the boat.

== Construction ==
Because of the large scale of the tablet's specification, it was only feasible to build at about one third scale at a site in Alleppey, India, over a period of four months. The team used the original specification and materials (wood, bamboo, palms and reed to secure the joints) without modern power tools, nails or glue. The completed ark weighed around 35 metric tons (39 short tons). The Iraqi government prevented the export of local bitumen, which meant that inferior bitumen had to be used instead. As a result, the reconstructed ark was only a partial success because of the lower quality bitumen and the boat immediately succumbed to leaks. A gasoline-powered pump had to continuously be used to pump out water.

Finkel said that the scaled-down version of the ark is just large enough to accommodate a few pairs of "well behaved animals". However, he did not think that the full-sized vessel would have been possible, having supervised the building of the smaller replica. This opinion was based on the boat's structural integrity as well as the vast amount of materials needed. Finkel said that the wood for the ribs and planks, large enough for the design, could not have been found. Since the Babylonians did not know how to splice wood, the full-sized ark would have been impossible to build.

== Documentary ==
The project was documented in a 2014 TV documentary for the UK's Channel 4 called The Real Noah's Ark. It was later Americanised for Secrets of Noah's Ark, which aired as an episode of PBS's NOVA series. His study was described in his book The Ark Before Noah. It was widely reported in the news media.
