= Tzedakah box =

Receptacle for charitable donations in Judaism

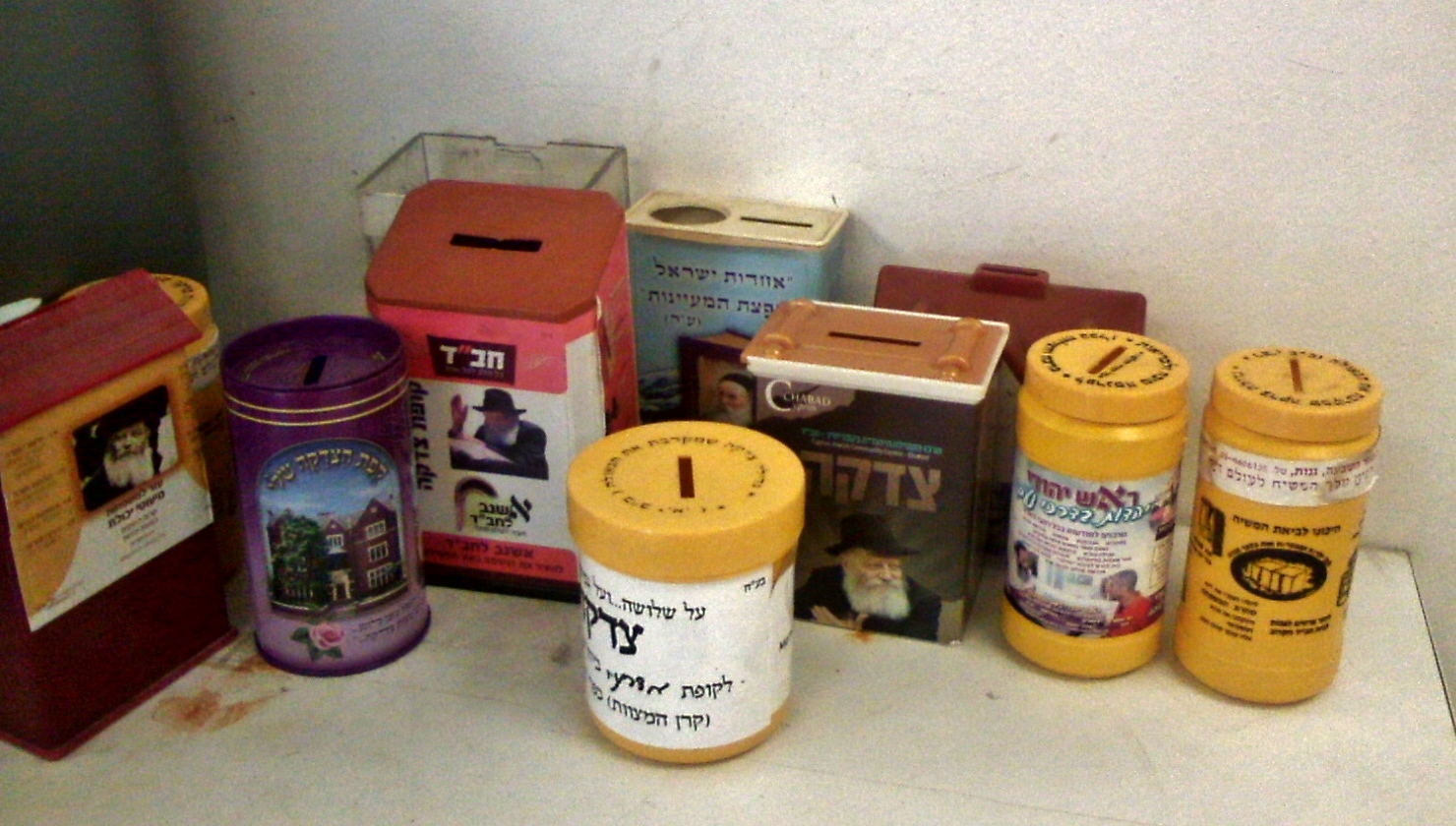
Collection of tzedakah boxes.

A tzedakah box (Hebrew: קוּפָּת צְדָקָה) or pushke (Yiddish: פּושקע) is a receptacle for charitable donations in Judaism.

== History ==
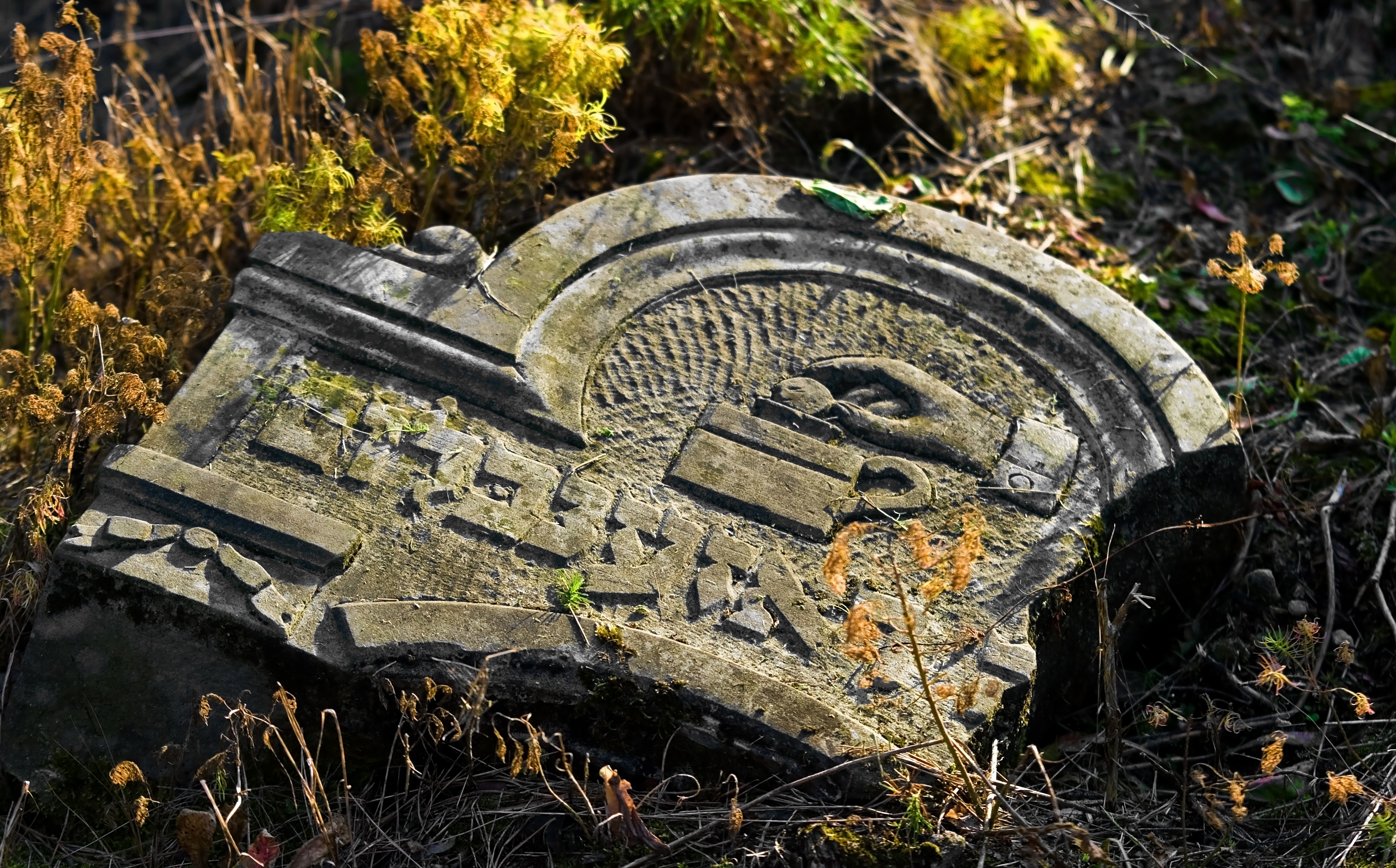
Vestige of a Jewish gravestone depicting a tzedakah box.

The earliest mention of a tzedakah box is in connection with the priest Jehoiada, who crafted a chest with a hole in its lid, positioning it next to the altar's main entrance on the southern side of the Temple. Within this chest, all offerings were placed to establish a fund for repairing of the sacred structure. According to the Mishnah, the Second Temple featured thirteen boxes shaped like a shofar into which coins were deposited. The funds within were allocated for various Temple sacrifices and charitable endeavours. In later times, the boxes became repositories for communal contributions intended to provide sustenance for the needy every Friday.

Historically, synagogues and batei midrash were equipped with sets of tzedakah boxes, each bearing an inscription to indicate the designated purpose for the collected funds. Among these boxes were one for bedeḳ ha-bayit (synagogue repairs), a second for candles in the bet ha-midrash, a third for the Talmud Torah, a fourth for malbish 'arummim (clothing for the poor), and a fifth for gemilat ḥasadim (interest-free loans for the poor). Finally, a special box bore the inscription mattan ba-seter ('a secret gift'), into which substantial sums were often contributed by anonymous benefactors who sometimes specified the intended distribution of the funds. Oversight of the tzedakah boxes was entrusted to gabba'im.

Tzedakah boxes are also found prominently in private residences and businesses to garner support for charitable causes. A common practice is for children to receive money weekly to place into the tzedakah box just before Shabbat.

== See also ==
- Poor box
- Zakat
