= Agudas Chasidei Chabad =

Chabad-Lubavitch organization

- Nickname: Aguch
- Formation: April 13,1923
- Founder: Rabbi Yosef Yitzchok Schneersohn
- Headquarters: 770 Eastern Parkway
- Location: Brooklyn, New York, United states
- Chairman: Abraham Shemtov
- Subsidiaries: Merkos L'Inyonei Chinuch, Machne Israel, Tomchei Temimim, Library of Agudas Chassidei Chabad, Lubavitch Youth Organization
- Website: http://agudaschassideichabad.com/

Agudas Chassidei Chabad (Hebrew:אַגּוּדַת חַסִּידֵי חַבָּ"ד ʔagudat ḥasidē ḥabad. lit. 'Association of the Hasidim of Chabad') is the umbrella organization for the worldwide Chabad-Lubavitch movement. The chairman of the executive committee is Rabbi Abraham Shemtov.

== History ==
Agudas Chasidei Chabad was established by the sixth Lubavitcher Rebbe, Rabbi Yosef Yitzchok Schneersohn in 1923. The founding meeting was in the early spring (27 Nisan), attended by about ten Lubavitcher Chassidim.

The American branch existed at least as far back as 1927. It was led by lay officers, and four rabbis serving as directors (Lakshin, Simpson, Mendelson, and Rabinowitz). In 1940, after arriving in the United States, Schneersohn became president, effectively making the American branch the worldwide organization base. In 1941, following the arrival of his son-in-law, Rabbi Menachem Schneerson, he appointed him as executive chairman.

After Schneersohn died in 1950, his son-in-law succeeded him as President of Agudas Chassidei Chabad.

== Library of Agudas Chassidei Chabad ==
During World War II, Schneersohn was forced to flee from the USSR and went to Poland. He was given permission by the Soviet government to take many of his religious texts from his library with him. In March 1940, Schneersohn escaped Europe and immigrated to the United States, though he was unable to bring his library with him. During the 1970s, a significant portion of the collection was recovered in Poland and returned to Chabad. The library, now overseen by Rabbi Shalom Dovber Levine, holds over 250,000 volumes.

== Litigation ==
Agudas Chasidei Chabad v. Russian Federation is an international legal dispute which concerns the ownership of certain Jewish religious books and manuscripts belonging to the Chabad-Lubavitch movement. This literary archive which originated in the Russian empire was later seized by the Soviet authorities.

In 2004, Chabad filed a suit against the Russian Federation in the United States federal court holding that the collection had been taken in violation of International Law. Eventually, the U.S courts ruled that the requisite jurisdiction existed under the Foreign Sovereign Immunities Act’s expropriation exception and pronounced a default judgment in the favor of the Chabad in 2010, after Russia declined to participate in the proceedings.

== Ownership of 770 Eastern Parkway ==
In 2010, a New York judge ruled in favor of Agudas Chasidei Chabad, deciding over an ownership dispute between the organization and the Gabbayim of the synagogue housed at 770 Eastern Parkway. The court ordered the Gabbayim to deliver possession of the premises of 770 Eastern Parkway to Agudas Chasidei Chabad.
