= Gabbai =

Person who assists in the running of synagogue services in some way

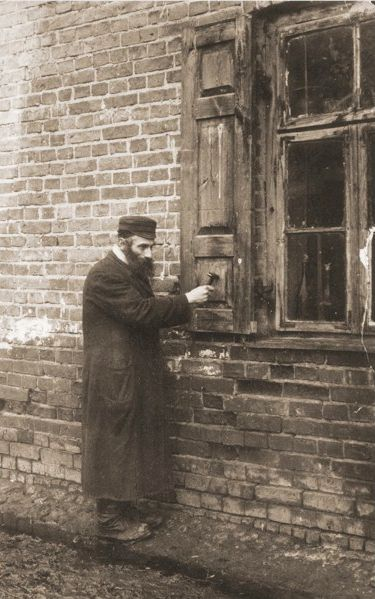
Gabbai in Biała Podlaska (Poland, 1926)

A gabbai (Hebrew: גַּבַּאי; sometimes transliterated as gabay), also known as a shamash (שַׁמָשׁ; sometimes transcribed as shamas) or warden (in British English, similar to churchwarden), is a beadle or sexton—a person who assists in the running of synagogue services in some way. The role may be undertaken on a voluntary or paid basis. A shamash (lit. 'servant') or gabbai can also be an assistant to a rabbi, particularly the secretary or personal assistant to a Hasidic rebbe. In the Sephardic Jewish ma'amad, the local or regional council of elders (or 'board of directors') of Sephardi Jewish communities, the position of gabbai was that of the treasurer.

== Etymology ==
The word gabbai is Hebrew and, in Talmudic times, meant "collector of taxes or charity" or "treasurer".

The term shamash is sometimes used for the gabbai, the caretaker or "man of all work" in a synagogue.

== Duties ==
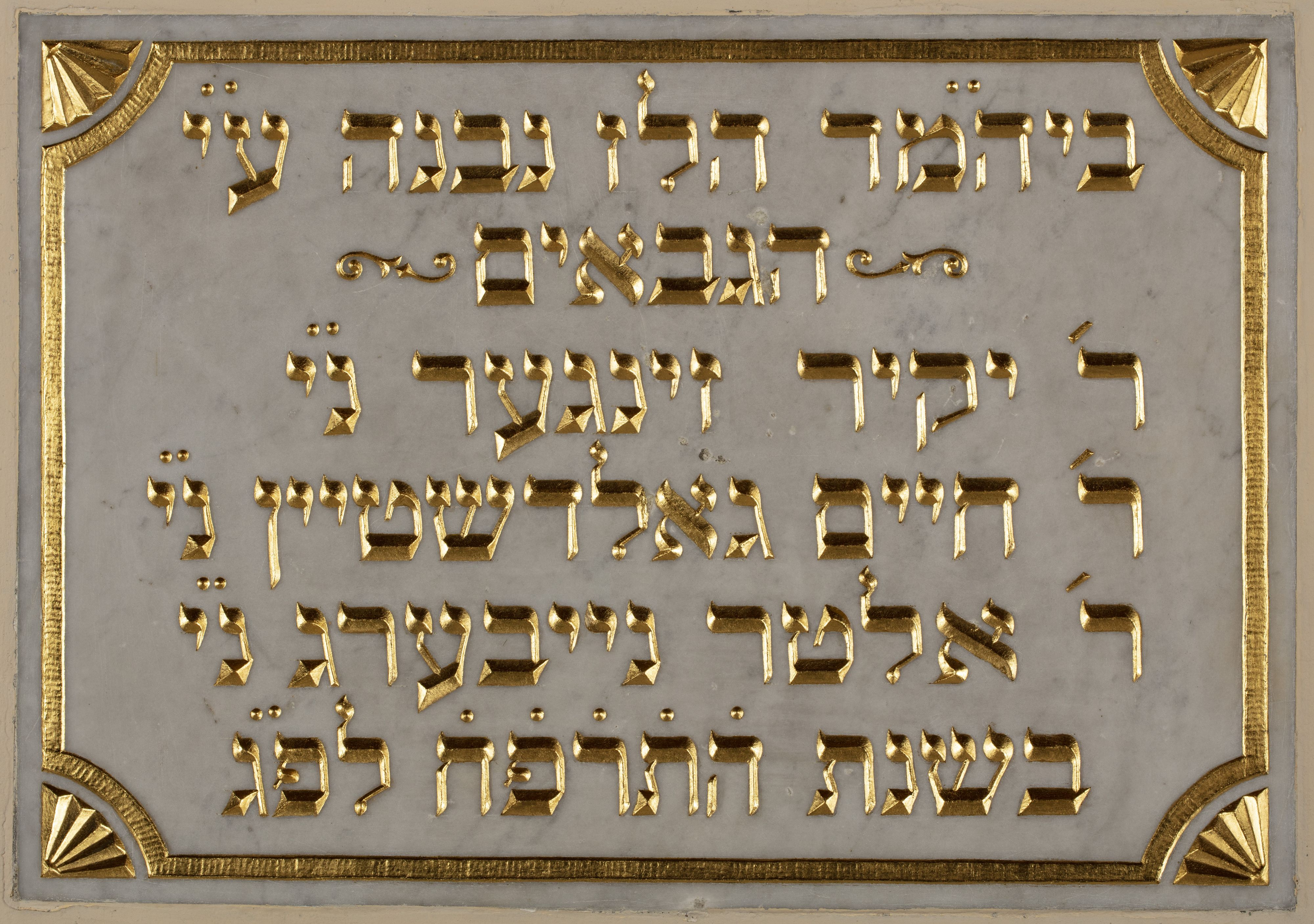
A plaque commemorating three gabbai – administrators of the Chevra Lomdei Mishnayot Synagogue in Oświęcim in southern Poland, 1928

While the specific set of duties vary from synagogue to synagogue, a gabbai's responsibilities will typically include ensuring that the religious services run smoothly.

The gabbai may be responsible for calling congregants up to the Torah. In some synagogues, the gabbai stands next to the Torah reader, holding a version of the text with vowels and trope markings (which are not present in the actual Torah scroll), following along in order to correct the reader if the reader makes an error. In other synagogues, these responsibilities are instead that of a sgan (סגן).

A gabbai might manage some of the financial affairs of the institution, such as collection of contributions and keeping financial records. The administrator of charitable funds might be called the gabbai tzedakah.

A gabbai's responsibilities might also include maintaining a Jewish cemetery.

== Dress ==
In some parts of the world, the gabbaim wear special clothing. In Anglo-Jewry, for example, gabbaim in some synagogue movements have traditionally worn top hats, and where there is a shamash, he may wear canonicals.

== In popular culture ==
An example from literature is "Moshe the Beadle", a character in Night by Elie Wiesel.
