= 11 Nisan =

Chabad-Lubavitch Holiday

- Observed by: Chabad-Lubavich community
- Type: Commemoration
- Significance: Birthday of Rabbi Menachem Mendel Schneerson
- Date: 11 Nisan
- 2025 date: April 2
- 2026 date: April 9
- 2027 date: March 29
- 2028 date: April 18
- Frequency: Annual

11 Nisan or Yud Aleph Nisan (Hebrew: י״א נִיסָן Yūʾd ʾAl ef Nī sān lit. 'the eleventh of Nisan') is a holiday on the Chabad-Lubavitch calendar that marks the birthday of the Lubavitcher Rebbe, Rabbi Menachem Mendel Schneerson. Rabbi Schneerson was born on April 5, 1902 corresponding to 11 Nisan 5662.

== History ==
Leading up to the Lubavitcher Rebbe's birth, Chabad-Lubavitch was under the leadership of the Frierdiker Rebbe, Rabbi Yosef Yitzchak Schneersohn. His mother Rebbetzin Chana Schneersohn had two sons already, Dovber Schneerson and Yisroel Aryeh Leib Schneerson.

The Lubavitcher Rebbe was born on 18 April [O.S. 5 April] 1902 (11 Nisan, 5662), in the Black Sea port of Nikolaev in the Russian Empire (now Mykolaiv in Ukraine).

The Lubavitcher Rebbe would observe the Frierdiker Rebbe's birthday, 12 Tammuz, by visiting the Ohel (the gravesite of the Frierdiker Rebbe) every year.

During the Rebbe’s leadership, the Rebbe would observe his birthday, 11 Nisan (as well as 25 Adar, the Rebbetzin’s birthday) as a special day every year by going to the Ohel. In 5712 (the Rebbe’s fiftieth birthday), the Rebbe said a maamar to a group of Chassidim, and in 5722 (the Rebbe’s sixtieth birthday) the Rebbe held a special farbrengen. From 5731 onwards, the Rebbe held a farbrengen or said a sicha each year in connection with Yud-Alef Nisan.

From the beginning of the Rebbe's leadership, it was customary for followers of the Rebbe, mainly students of Tomchei Tmimim to arrange a Yechidut (private audience) with the Lubavitcher Rebbe or write a Pan (personal letter) to him on their Hebrew birthday.

After the Lubavitcher Rebbe passed away on June 12, 1994 (3 Tammuz 5754), his followers intensified their celebrations of his birthday, observing it with even greater enthusiasm than when he was alive.

== Commemoration ==
Followers of the Lubavitcher Rebbe commemorate his birthday every year on 11 Nisan, recognizing it as a time for reflection on the Rebbe's contributions to Jewish life and his leadership.

Many followers from around the world visit 770 Eastern Parkway (the headquarters of Chabad as well as the synagogue of the Lubavitcher Rebbe) and the Ohel (the gravesite of the Lubavitcher Rebbe and the Frierdiker Rebbe).

Some Chabad followers conduct special gatherings such as rallies and concerts, often attracting thousands of participants.

On Yud Aleph Nisan of 2004, March 28, a dedication ceremony was held for "Schneerson Square", a co-named section of Pico Boulevard.

== Recognition ==
The United States recognizes 11 Nisan as "Education and Sharing Day," In 1978, the U.S. Congress passed a resolution to designate this day in recognition of the Lubavitcher Rebbe's efforts to promote educational values. The first proclamation was made by President Jimmy Carter, who acknowledged the Lubavitcher Rebbe’s influence in shaping education. Since then, each U.S. president has continued to formally recognize this day.

This day was established to honor the Lubavitcher Rebbe's commitment and contributions to education and moral values, which he believed were essential for a healthy society

== See also ==
- Nisan
- 12-13 Tammuz
- Shneur Zalman of Liadi
- Chabad house
