= Chabad customs and holidays =

Practices and rituals of the Chabad-Lubavitch Hasidic movement

Chabad customs and holidays are the practices, rituals and holidays performed and celebrated by adherents of the Chabad-Lubavitch Hasidic movement. The customs, or minhagim and prayer services are based on Lurianic kabbalah. The holidays are celebrations of events in Chabad history. General Chabad customs, called minhagim, distinguish the movement from other Hasidic groups.

== Customs ==
- Forms of dress – Chabad males, starting from Bar Mitzvah age, mostly wear black fedoras. This is in contrast to other Hasidic groups who wear shtreimels, a type of fur hat. Chabad women, like other Orthodox Jews, wear clothing that conform to tzniut (Hebrew: צניעות, "modesty").
- Speech and language – Many Chabad Hasidim in English speaking countries speak both English and Yiddish.
  - Dialects – Many American Chabad Hasidim pronounce Hebrew according to the Lithuanian dialect.
  - Linguistic features – English speaking adherents are thought to use a cluster of linguistic features including a “/t/ release” at the end of some words, borrowed Hebrew terms, and “chanting intonation contours”. This linguistic cluster forms a unique "learned, Orthodox style” used by male adherents, and to a lesser extent, by female adherents.
  - Code-switching – In Chabad, code-switching, or the alternating between two or more languages in speech occurs among English speaking members of the movement. Chabad adherents switch between standard English and a "Jewish English" which is a Jewish variety of English with influences from Yiddish, textual Hebrew and modern Hebrew.
- Song and music – Like many other Hasidic groups, Chabad attaches importance to singing Chabad Hasidic nigunim (melodies), usually without words, and following precise customs of their leaders. To Chabad followers, the niggun is a primary link between the mundane and divine realms. Chabad followers also compose songs using lyrics and contemporary styles.
  - Zemiros – Unlike other Orthodox communities, the Chabad prayerbook does not include Shabbos Zemiros, songs traditionally sung on the Sabbath. The Chabad community is thought to replace these songs with their own niggunim (wordless melodies), or with the recitation of Hasidic discourses.
- Daily study – Among the customs of the Chabad movement are schedules of daily study of Jewish religious works. These study schedules were often encouraged by Rabbi Menachem Mendel Schneerson. They include:
  - Chitas – selected portions of the Torah, Psalms and Tanya, the central book of Chabad theology. The practice was founded by Yosef Yitzchak Schneersohn.
  - Rambam – selected portions from either Maimonides's Mishneh Torah (Yad Hachazakah) or his Sefer Hamitzvot. The practice was founded by Menachem Mendel Schneersohn.
- Pregnancy – Chabad Hasidim refrain from publicizing a pregnancy until the woman has entered the fifth month.
- Bar Mitzvah – It is customary in Chabad communities for a child celebrating his Bar Mitzvah to recite the Chassidic discourse titled Isa b'Midrash T[eh]illim.
- Tefillin – The custom of Chabad males, starting from Bar Mitzvah age, is to don an additional pair of Tefillin, called "Tefillin of Rabbeinu Tam".
- The Ten Commandments – It is customary in Chabad for all family members, even infants, to attend the reading of the Ten Commandments on the holiday of Shavuot.
- Passover – It is customary in Chabad communities, on passover, to limit contact of matzah (an unleavened bread eaten on passover) with water. This custom is called gebrokts (Yiddish: געבראָכטס, lit. 'broken'). However, on the last day of passover, it is customary to intentionally have matzah come in contact with water.
  - The Four Questions – The Chabad custom for the order of the "Four Questions", a customary recitation where the child asks the parent what makes Passover unique, differs from the order in the standard Orthodox custom. The Chabad order is as follows: 1. Dipping the food 2. Eating matzah 3. Eating bitter herbs 4. Reclining.
- Chanukah – It is the custom of Chabad Hasidim to place the Chanukah menorah against the room's doorpost (and not on the windowsill).
- Synagogue readings — In some Lubavitcher congregations, the daily entry in the book Hayom Yom (a book of Hasidic sayings compiled by the seventh Chabad Rebbe) is read aloud after the morning service. This practice serves to provide words of guidance and inspiration as one prepares to leave the synagogue. This post-prayer reading seems to be a more common practice in Chabad communities in North and South America, and less common in Israel.

== Holidays ==
There are a number of days marked by the Chabad movement as special days. Major holidays include the liberation dates of the leaders of the movement, the Rebbes of Chabad, others corresponded to the leaders' birthdays, anniversaries of death, and other life events. The leaders of the Chabad movement were, at times, subject to imprisonment by the Russian government. The days marking the leaders' release, are celebrated by the Chabad movement as "Days of Liberation" (Hebrew: יום גאולה (Yom Geulah)).

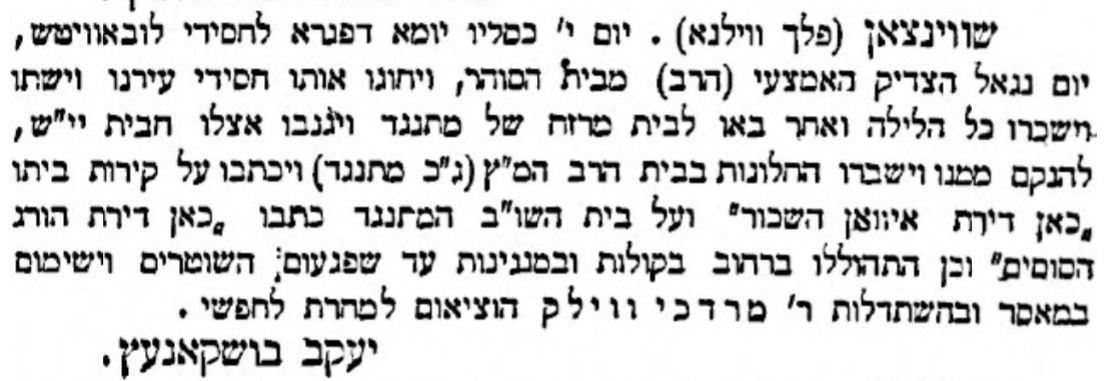
Report of 10 Kislev Farbrengen in Švenčionys, Lithuania. (HaMelitz. 12 December 1882. P8.)

- Vav Tishrei (6 Tishrei) – The yartzeit of Rebbetzin Chana Schneerson, mother of the Lubavitcher Rebbe.
- Yud Gimel Tishrei (13 Tishrei) – The yartzeit of Rabbi Shmuel Schneersohn, the fourth Rebbe of Chabad.
- Chof Cheshvan (20 Cheshvan) – Birthday of Rabbi Sholom Dovber Schneersohn, the fifth Rebbe of Chabad.
- Rosh Chodesh Kislev (1 Kislev) – Marking Rabbi Menachem Mendel Schneerson's recovery from a heart attack in 1977.
- Tes Kislev (9 Kislev) – Birthday and the yartzeit of Rabbi Dovber Schneuri, the second Rebbe of Chabad.
- Yud Kislev (10 Kislev) – Liberation of Rabbi Dovber Schneuri, the second Rebbe of Chabad.
- Yud Daled Kislev (14 Kislev) – Anniversary of the wedding of Rabbi Menachem Mendel Schneerson and Rebbetzin Chaya Mushka Schneerson.
- Yud Tes Kislev - Chof Kislev (19-20 Kislev) – Known as the "Rosh Hashanah of Chassidism," marking the liberation of Rabbi Shneur Zalman of Liadi on 19 Kislev and his subsequence liberation from the inquisitive misnagdim on 20 Kislev, which also coincided with the publishing of the foundational Chassidic work, the Tanya. Also marks the yartzeit of Rabbi Dovber of Mezritch as well as the birth of Menucha Rochel Slonim.
- Hei Teves (5 Tevet) – Sefarim Victory, marking the return of stolen books to the Chabad library.
- Chof Daled Teves (24 Teves) – The yartzeit of Rabbi Shneur Zalman of Liadi, the founder of Chabad.
- Yud Shvat (10 Shvat) – The yartzeit of Rabbi Yosef Yitzchak Schneersohn, the sixth Rebbe of Chabad; also marks Rabbi Menachem Mendel Schneerson's acceptance of leadership.
- Chof Beis Shvat (22 Shvat) – The yartzeit of Rebbetzin Chaya Mushka Schneerson, wife of Rabbi Menachem Mendel Schneerson.
- Chof Hei Adar (25 Adar) – Birthday of Rebbetzin Chaya Mushka Schneerson.
- Beis Nissan (2 Nissan) – The yartzeit of Rabbi Sholom Dovber Schneersohn, the fifth Rebbe of Chabad.
- Yud Aleph Nissan (11 Nissan) – Birthday of Rabbi Menachem Mendel Schneerson, the seventh Rebbe of Chabad.
- Yud Gimel Nissan (13 Nissan) – The yartzeit of Rabbi Menachem Mendel Schneersohn, the third Rebbe of Chabad (Tzemach Tzeddek).
- Beis Iyar (2 Iyar) – Birthday of Rabbi Shmuel Schneersohn, the fourth Rebbe of Chabad.
- Vav Sivan (6 Sivan) – The yartzeit of Rabbi Israel Baal Shem Tov, founder of Hasidism.
- Gimmel Tammuz (3 Tammuz) – The yartzeit of Rabbi Menachem Mendel Schneerson, the seventh Rebbe of Chabad. The initial liberation of Rabbi Yosef Yitzchak Schneersohn, the sixth rebbe of Chabad.
- Yud Beis-Yud Gimmel Tammuz (12-13 Tammuz) – Birthday and final liberation of Rabbi Yosef Yitzchak Schneersohn, the sixth Rebbe of Chabad, the date he was released from Soviet prison.
- Chof Av (20 Av) – The yartzeit of Rabbi Levi Yitzchak Schneerson, father of the Lubavitcher Rebbe.
- Tes Vav Elul (15 Elul) – Founding of Tomchei Tmimim, the central Chabad yeshiva.
- Chai Elul (18 Elul) – Birthday of Rabbi Shneur Zalman of Liadi, founder of Chabad, and Rabbi Israel Baal Shem Tov, founder of Hasidism.
- Chof Tes Elul (29 Elul) – Birthday of Rabbi Menachem Mendel Schneersohn (Tzemach Tzeddek), the third Rebbe of Chabad.

== See also ==
- Chabad
- Jewish customs
