= 6 Tishrei =

Chabad holiday marking the yahrzeit of Rebbetzin Chana Schneerson

Vav Tishrei
- Observed by: Chabad
- Type: Commemoration
- Significance: Yahrzeit (anniversary of the passing) of Rebbetzin Chana Schneerson
- Date: 6 Tishrei
- 2025 date: September 28
- 2026 date: September 17
- 2027 date: October 7
- 2028 date: September 26
- Frequency: Annual
- First time: September 12, 1964

6 Tishrei or Vav Tishrei (Hebrew: ו׳ תשרי) is a commemorative holiday on the Chabad calendar marking the yahrzeit (anniversary of death) of Rebbetzin Chana Schneerson, the mother of the 7th Rebbe of Chabad, Menachem Mendel Schneerson. Chana Schneerson died on September 12, 1964, corresponding to 6 Tishrei 5725 on the Hebrew calendar.

The date is observed by Chabad followers worldwide with farbrengens (Chassidic gatherings) and religious educational programs reflecting on her life and legacy.

== Observances ==
=== Farbrengens ===
Within Chabad communities, the day is commonly marked with farbrengens, traditional Chassidic gatherings, during which stories about Rebbetzin Chana are recounted and her life and influence are discussed.

During the lifetime of the Rebbe, Menachem Mendel Schneerson commemorated the date with a farbrengen in his mother's honor. These gatherings would often begin with a siyum, the public completion of a tractate of Talmud study. During these gatherings the Rebbe emphasized the three mitzvot traditionally related to Jewish women and girls: Challah, Niddah, and Shabbat candles. Recordings of the Rebbe's farbrengens held on Vav Tishrei are often viewed in Chabad institutions and communities around the world.

=== Charitable initiatives ===
The Rebbe established a charitable fund known as Keren Chana, administered by Machne Israel in memory of his mother. The fund was created to help young Jewish girls to continue to receive Jewish education through long-term loans. On Vav Tishrei donations to the fund are encouraged in her memory. Donations to the fund are often encouraged on Vav Tishrei, and acts of charity are commonly performed in her memory.

=== In Chabad schools ===
In Chabad preschools and elementary schools the date is also marked through programming for students. Often lessons, storytelling sessions, and classroom activities about the life of Rebbetzin Chana are held. Religious educational materials and lesson plans dedicated to the day are used in Chabad schools as part of programming on commemorative dates in the Chabad calendar. In some institutions, special learning initiatives and campaigns encouraging students to study teachings about and in honor of Rebbetzin are organized.

== See also ==
- Chana Schneerson
- Tishrei
- Chabad customs and holidays
