= Farbrengen =

Chabad-Lubavitch gethering

A farbrengen (/fɑːrbrɛŋɡɛn/, Yiddish: פארברענגען, lit. '[joyous] gathering'; German: verbringen "to spend [time/solidarity/festivity together]") is a Hasidic gathering. This term is only used by Chabad-Lubavitch Hasidim, as other Hasidim have a tish or a botteh. Carried out in a relaxed atmosphere, with no rigid schedule, it may consist of edifying discussions, explanations of general Torah subjects, with an emphasis on Hasidic philosophy, relating of Hasidic stories, and lively Hasidic melodies, with refreshments being served. It is regarded as a time of great holiness. Farbrengens are public events open to non-Hasidim as well.

== Occasions when farbrengens are held ==
Farbrengens are usually held on Shabbos, Yom Tov, or an auspicious day in the Hasidic calendar such as a birthday or Yom Hillula of one of the Chabad Rebbes, or a day in which one of the Chabad Rebbes was released from prison. Because of the emphasis on inspiration, self-examination and the making of new resolutions common at farbrengens, they are also often held in preparation for events related to teshuvah, such as on Thursday (in preparation for the Shabbos, whose letters השבת can be rearranged to spell teshuvah, תשבה), Rosh Chodesh (which has similar qualities to Rosh HaShanah and Yom Kippur), or similar days.

According to the instructions of Rabbi Menachem Mendel Schneerson it is also customary for Chasidim to hold a farbrengen with their friends on their birthday, and Rabbi Schneerson encouraged all Jews to do so. A farbrengen is also held on the occasion of one's engagement and wedding. Thus, farbrengens are held often.

The goal of the farbrengen is to inspire one to grow in his spirituality.

=== Chabad holidays ===
Farbrengens are typically held on the following Chabad holidays:

- 1 Kislev
- 10 Kislev
- 14 Kislev
- 19 Kislev
- 5 Teves
- 22 Shvat
- 11 Nissan
- 3 Tammuz
- 12-13 Tammuz

== Niggunim ==
At farbrengens it is customary to sing Hasidic melodies known as niggunim (singular: niggun). Chabad tradition contains many hundreds of such tunes, both slow and soul-stirring, and fast and lively. The goal is for the niggun to inspire and open the hearts of the participants. Zemiros are not sung.

== Wishing l'chaim ==
All attending wish lechaim (blessings of life) to one another. The reason for the l'chaim is to open the hearts of the participants to be inspired to want to change, and internalize what is being spoken at the farbrengen. In addition, since the farbrengen often includes discussion about very sensitive matters, with pointed criticism, alcohol is consumed in order to lessen the tension amongst the participants. However, it is only meant to be drunk sparingly, as Rabbi Menachem Mendel Schneerson forbade drinking more than four shot glasses of alcohol ("l'chaims") for anyone under the age of 40.

== Formats ==
All farbrengens include songs (a niggun) and speech, the speaker taking breaks for song.

Generally speaking, there are three possible formats for a farbrengen:

- The Rebbe (most recently Rabbi Menachem Mendel Schneerson at 770 in Brooklyn, New York) would sit at the head, speak in Yiddish, lead a wordless melody, and then answer the L'chaim, a toast (on small cups of kosher wine), as it was offered by each person in the room. He made eye contact, nodded, and then moved along the sea of faces to the next person.
  It is not customary for Chabad Rebbes to distribute their shirayim (שיריים, leftovers) to those assembled, and thus this gathering is never referred to as a tish.
- A mashpia or similar community leader leads the farbrengen in a public setting, such as at the synagogue. The role of the speaker is to educate and transmit a Chasidic educational message to the participants.
- Several Hasidim gather together to discuss matters of divine service in a very intimate, serious, individualised, but informal way. There is no main speaker.

Farbrengens are customarily gender-segregated; most commonly nowadays this is done through separate farbrengens for each gender, although the Rebbe hosted farbrengens with both genders present but the women in a separate section where he could not see them. A women's farbrengen is nowadays a farbrengen for women only, although the Rebbe hosted at least one in which the women sat in the men's section while the men sat in the out-of-view women's section.

== Meaning of a farbrengen ==
The Alter Rebbe related that a "note fell down from the Heavens," containing the following: "What a Hasidic farbrengen can achieve, even the angel Michael cannot achieve". However, in popular speech, most chasidim attribute the saying to Rav Hillel Paritcher. This power stems from the idea that when God, regarded as our father, sees that His children are sitting together in unity and love, He is then aroused with a desire to fulfill all their requests, even those of which they would not be worthy via normal means, such as via the advocacy of Michoel, the defending angel of the Jewish people. Indeed, Chasidic tradition includes many stories of people who were saved by taking part in a farbrengen and being thereby blessed.

Farbrengen literally means "get together". It is called this name so the evil inclination will be fooled to think that this is just like any other get together and will not be on guard and try to get the person to ignore the inspiration of the gathering.

There is a Chabad Chasidic saying "when two get together to talk of their spiritual failings, it is two Godly souls vs. one animal soul." The reasoning is, the Godly souls are selfless and are more than happy to unite and help each other in the spiritual failing at hand. However, the animal soul is innately selfish and thus each animal soul will not join forces. Thus, at a farbrengen, when Chassidim get together to inspire one another, they have the help of each other's Godly souls, greatly out-numbering the animal souls.

== Sources ==
- Definition of a farbrengen
- Sources about farbrengens: part 1, part 2
