= Babinavichy =

Agrotown in Vitebsk Region, Belarus

Babinavichy Бабінавічы (Belarusian) Бабиновичи (Russian)
- Agrotown
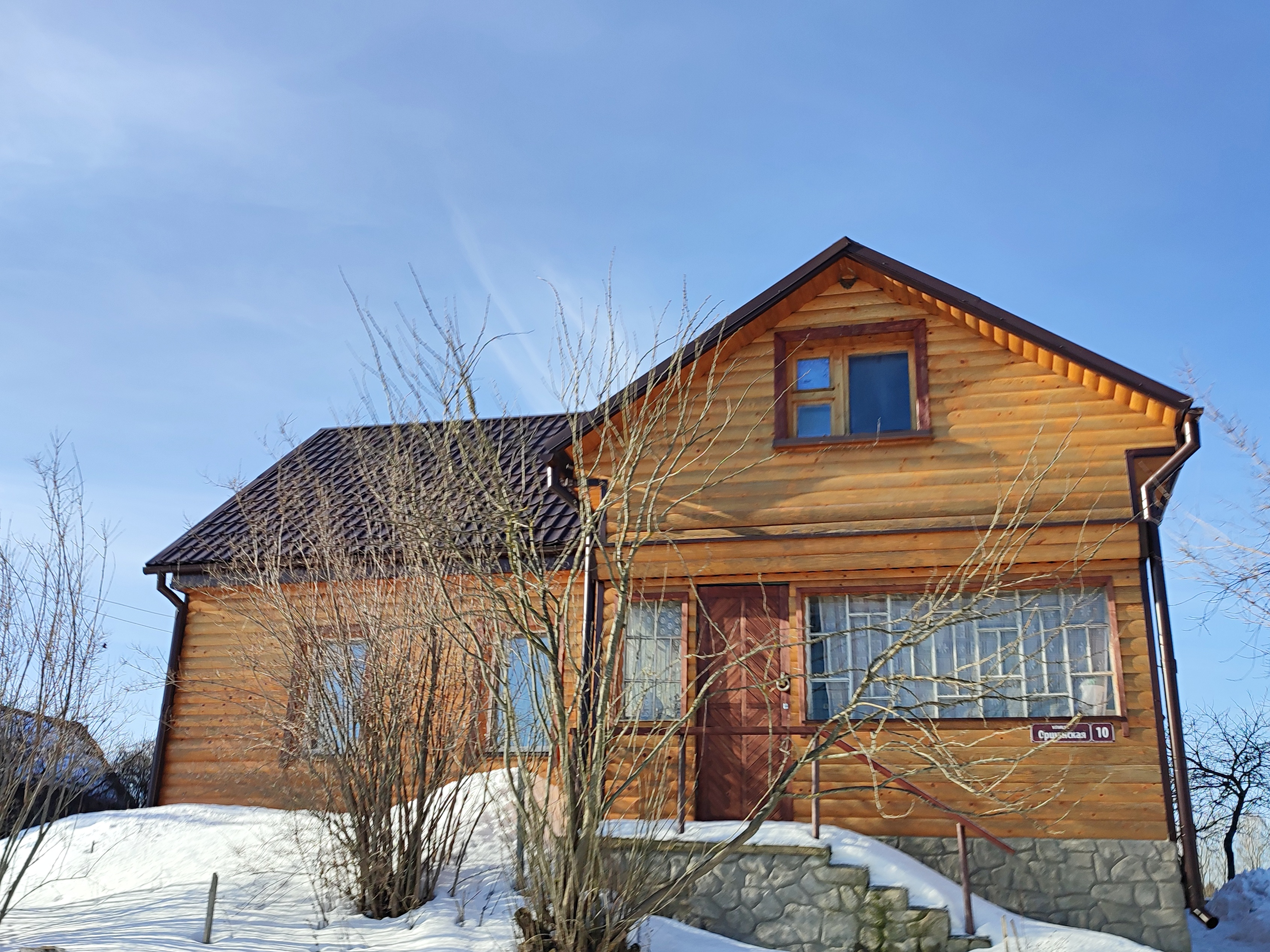

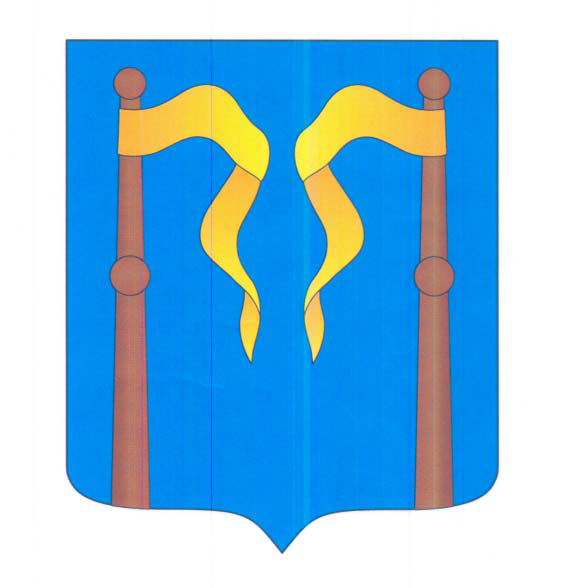
- Seal

- Location within Belarus
- Coordinates: 54°50′N 30°33′E
- Country: Belarus
- Region: Vitebsk Region
- District: Lyozna District
- Time zone: UTC+3 (MSK)

Babinavichy (Belarusian: Бабінавічы, romanized: Babinavičy; Russian: Бабиновичи, romanized: Babinovichi) is an agrotown in Lyozna District, Vitebsk Region, Belarus. It serves as the administrative center of Babinavichy selsoviet.

== History ==
The town traditionally supplied timber for the Imperial Russian Navy, as is reflected in its coat-of-arms which depicts two masts.

The town was previously a Jewish shtetl situated in the Mogilev Governorate of the Russian Empire. In 1930, there were 262 Jews living there, with 115 remaining at the start of the war.

== Notable people ==
- Chaya Mushka Schneerson (1901–1988), daughter of Yosef Yitzchak Schneersohn and wife of Menachem Mendel Schneerson.

== Sources ==
- Megargee, Geoffrey P.; Dean, Martin (2012). The United States Holocaust Memorial Museum Encyclopedia of Camps and Ghettos 1933–1945. Volume II. Indiana University Press, United States Holocaust Memorial Museum. pp. 1699–1700. ISBN 978-0-253-35599-7.
