= Meir Shlomo Yanovsky =

Hasidic rabbi (1850–1933)

Meir Shlomo Yanovsky Ha'Levi
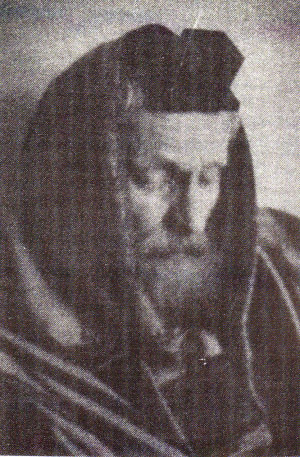

Personal life
- Born: 1850
- Died: September 14, 1933 (aged 82–83)
- Spouse: Rachel Poshnitz
- Parents: Yisrael Leib (father); Marat Lavut (mother)
- Dynasty: Chabad-Lubavitch

Religious life
- Religion: Judaism

Jewish leader
- Predecessor: Avraham David Lavut
- Successor: Levi Yitzchak Schneerson
- Dynasty: Chabad-Lubavitch

Military service
- Rank: Rabbi of Nikolayev

Rabbi Meir Shlomo Ha'Levi Yanovsky (Hebrew: מאיר שלמה ינובסקי; 1850 – September 14, 1933) was a rabbi of Nikolayev, a composer of Chabad music, and the grandfather of Rabbi Menachem Mendel Schneerson.

== Biography ==
Yanovsky was born to Rabbi Yisrael Leib of the Romanivka Chabad and the daughter of Rabbi Avraham David Lavut. He was raised and educated by his grandfather in Nikolaev, who designated him as his successor in the rabbinate. By the time he grew up, he married Rachel Poshnitz, daughter of Rabbi Yitzhak Poshnitz of Dobrynka. After his marriage, he spent time in the court of Rabbi Shmuel Schneersohn in Lyubavichi. After the death of Rabbi Shmuel, he became a Chassid to Shmuel's son, Sholom Dovber Schneersohn. Rachel was murdered in the Holocaust.

After completing his studies in Lyubavichy, Yanovsky returned to Nikolaev to live with Lavut before his death on March 10, 1890. His grandfather gave a letter before his passing to the leaders of the Jewish community in the city requesting that Yanovsky be appointed as the city's rabbi as a replacement, as was done in 1890.

At one point, Yanovsky fell ill during a local Typhus outbreak. A fellow Nikolaev rabbi, Asher Grossman, came each day to read to him from the Tanya, which Yanvovsky had attributed as a significant part of his recovery from the illness.

=== Family ===
Yanovsky and his wife had a total of 3 children:

- The first, Chana, on June 18, 1900, married Rabbi Levi Yitzchak Schneerson, who eventually became the chief rabbi of Yekaterinoslav. Their eldest son, Menachem Mendel Scheerson, born in 1902, would later become the final rebbe of the Chabad-Lubavitch dynasty.
- Their second child, Miriam Gittel, in 1911, married Shmuel Schneerson, brother of Levi, who worked at the rabbinate in Nikolaev. He inherited the Nikolaev rabbinate upon Meir's death.
- Ettil, their third child, married Rabbi Zalman Mariash.
- Yisrael Leib was their final child and he died young; Yanovsky fell into a depression following his death.

== Sources ==
- Friedman, Alter Eliyahu (2006). A Mother in Israel. Brooklyn: Kehot Publication Society.Heilman, Samuel C.; Friedman, Menachem (2010). The rebbe: the life and afterlife of Menachem Mendel Schneerson. Princeton (N.J.): Princeton university press. ISBN 978-0-691-13888-6.
