= 3 Tammuz =

Chabad-Lubavich Holiday

- Observed by: Chabad
- Type: Commemoration
- Significance: Yahrzeit (anniversary of the passing) of Rabbi Menachem Mendel Schneerson)
- Date: 3 Tammuz
- 2025 date: June 29
- 2026 date: June 18
- 2027 date: July 8
- 2028 date: June 27
- Frequency: Annual
- First time: June 12, 1994

3 Tammuz or Gimmel Tammuz (Hebrew: גִּ׳ תַמּוּז, ɡˈɪmə͡l tˈamʌz lit. 'the third of Tammuz') is a holiday on the Chabad-Lubavich calendar that marks the anniversary of the passing of Rabbi Menachem Mendel Schneerson, the seventh Rebbe of the Chabad-Lubavitch Hasidic dynasty. Schneerson died on June 12, 1994, corresponding to 3 Tammuz 5754 in the Hebrew calendar. The day is observed by followers of Chabad-Lubavitch as a time for reflection on his teachings and legacy.

== Background ==
In the years leading up to his death, Rabbi Schneerson experienced significant health challenges. In 1992, he suffered a stroke that impaired his physical abilities and limited his mobility.

After his stroke, Rabbi Schneerson made limited public appearances, with his first post-stroke appearance occurring in May 1992. He was welcomed by his followers during this appearance at 770 Eastern Parkway his synagogue in Crown Heights, Brooklyn. His ability to communicate remained, as he often sent written letters and recorded messages for special occasions, maintaining a connection with his community. Many of his followers continued to express their belief in his leadership and teachings, reflecting their ongoing dedication to his vision for the Jewish community.

Rabbi Schneerson died on June 12, 1994, at the age of 92, marking the end of his physical presence within the Chabad-Lubavitch movement. His leadership continues to be recognized by the Chabad-Lubavitch community, and his teachings remain influential within the Jewish community.

== Commemoration ==
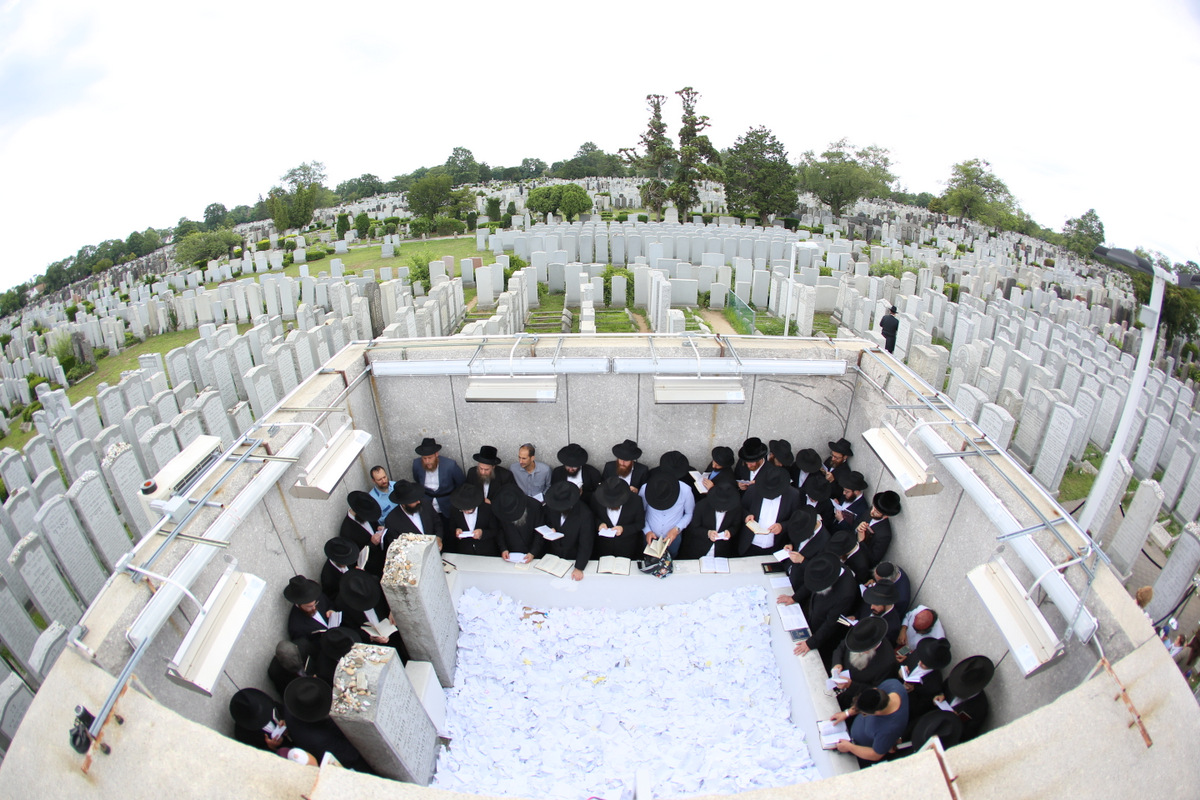
Chabad-Lubavich followers gathered in the Ohel on 3 Tammuz 2016 (July 13)

The anniversary of Rabbi Menachem Mendel Schneerson's passing on the 3rd of Tammuz is observed annually within the Chabad-Lubavitch community. Followers often visit his burial site, known as the Ohel, located in Queens, New York. It is customary for visitors to write a "pan" (Hebrew: פ"נ, pidyon nefesh, meaning literally "redemption of the soul"), a written request in which a person asks the Rebbe to intercede with God on their behalf, seeking blessings, assistance, or prayers for themselves or others. The pan is addressed to the Lubavitcher Rebbe and is traditionally placed at his gravesite. This practice reflects the belief among Chabad followers that the Rebbe continues to have a spiritual connection with his followers after his death.

Chabad views Gimmel Tammuz as a holiday that commemorates Rabbi Schneerson rather than a sad day, in line with the traditional beliefs of the anniversary of death of a tzadik. Thousands gather each year to pay tribute to his legacy and leadership.

In addition to these pilgrimages, Chabad institutions and communities worldwide mark the occasion by organizing farbrengens (gatherings). These events focus on Rabbi Schneerson's teachings and contributions to Jewish thought, which continue to influence the Chabad movement.

In addition to its significance related to Rabbi Menachem Mendel Schneerson, 3 Tammuz holds historical importance due to the events surrounding Rabbi Yosef Yitzchak Schneersohn, the sixth Rebbe of Chabad-Lubavitch, known as the Frierdiker Rebbe. On 3 Tammuz 5687 (July 12, 1927), the Frierdiker Rebbe was released from Soviet imprisonment. However, this date is not widely recognized as his full liberation, since he was only sent into exile in Kostroma at that time, and it wasn't until 12–13 Tammuz that he received permission to return home.

== Origin ==
The observance of the holiday traces its origins to the anniversary of passing) of Rabbi Yosef Yitzchak Schneersohn, the sixth Lubavitcher Rebbe, who died on January 28, 1950 (10th of Shevat 5780). After his death, Rabbi Menachem Mendel Schneerson, who succeeded him, emphasized the importance of this date in commemorating the legacy.

Rabbi Menachem Mendel Schneerson regularly visited the grave of his father-in-law, Rabbi Yosef Yitzchak Schneersohn, to pray for people who had sent him requests for blessings and assistance. He would often visit several times a week, bringing with him thousands of letters containing people's troubles, joys, and requests for prayer, and would spend hours at the gravesite reading them.

== See also ==
- Tammuz (Hebrew month)
- 12-13 Tammuz
- Seventeenth of Tammuz
- Education and Sharing Day
- Chabad customs and holidays
- Maamarim (Chabad)
- Ohel (grave)
