= Chana Schneerson =

Wife of a Ukrainian rabbi (1880–1964)

Rebbetzin Chana Schneerson
- Born: Chana Yanovsky; December 30, 1880; Nikolayev, Kherson Governorate, Russian Empire
- Died: September 12, 1964 (aged 83); Brooklyn, New York
- Spouse: Levi Yitzchak Schneerson
- Children: 3, including Menachem Mendel Schneerson
- Parents: Meir Shlomo Yanovsky (father); Rachel Yanovsky (mother)

Chana Schneerson (née Yanovsky; December 30, 1880 – September 12, 1964) was the wife of Levi Yitzchak Schneerson, a Chabad Hasidic rabbi in Yekatrinoslav, Ukraine and the mother of the seventh Chabad-Lubavitch Rebbe, Rabbi Menachem Mendel Schneerson.

Chana Schneerson's great-grandfather was Abraham David Lavut, a composer of Jewish literature upon which Chabadic prayer books are based (including the Siddur Im Dach).

== Early life ==
She was born Chana Yanovsky in 1880, on the 28th of Tevet in the Jewish agricultural colony of Nikolayev (now Mykolaiv, Ukraine) to Rabbi Meir Shlomo Yanovsky and Rachel Yanovsky. She was the eldest of four children, having two sisters, Gittel and Ettel, and a younger brother, Yisrael Leib, who died in his youth. Rabbi Meir Shlomo was the chief rabbi of Nikolayev.

As a teenager, she was educated by her father, and when a maamar would arrive from Lubavitch, she would meticulously and faithfully transcribe it, making it available for other Chasidim.

== Marriage to Levi Yitzchak ==
In 1900, she married Levi Yitzchak, a great-great-grandson of the third Rebbe of Lubavitch, Rabbi Menachem Mendel Schneersohn, also known as the Tzemach Tzedek. The wedding took place on the 13th of Sivan, in Nikolayev. The couple produced three sons, Menachem Mendel, Dov-Ber, and Yisroel Aryeh Leib. Their eldest son, Menachem Mendel, was later to become the seventh Rebbe of Lubavitch.

Levi Yitzchak was arrested in 1939, and exiled in 1940 for his religious practice. Schneerson joined him in exile. Levi Yitzchak died in 1944.

== Later years ==
Widowed, Schneerson left the Soviet Union in 1947. She transported Levi Yitzchak's religious writings, considered illegal contraband under the communist soviet regime, focused around the Kabbalah, upon moving. That year she went to Paris, France, where she met with her son, Menachem Mendel. They both immigrated to the United States, and lived in Brooklyn, New York.

She held extensive interviews with journalist Nissan Gordon, which have been published in Di Yiddishe Heim.

== Death ==
She died on September 12, 1964 (6 Tishrei 5725). She is buried at The Ohel. A Chabad myth claims that on the day of her death, her chair at 770 Eastern Parkway lit on fire.

In 2002, her memoirs, which she penned during the years 1947 until 1963, were published by the Kehot Publication Society as Mother in Israel - The life & memoirs of R' Chana.

Multiple Chabad institutions bearing Chana's name have been founded in the Rebbetzin's honor, including Bais Chana Women International, Machon Chana Women's Institute, and the Beis Chana girls secondary school network.

== Vav Tishrei ==
Chana's yahrzeit (anniversary of death) 6 Tishrei a.k.a. Vav Tishrei is observed within Chabad communities with farbrengens, study sessions about her life, and charitable initiatives established in her memory.
