= Education and Sharing Day =

Federal observance in the USA

- Official name: Education and Sharing Day, U.S.A.
- Observed by: United States
- Type: National
- Significance: Celebration of Rabbi Menachem Mendel Schneerson, hard work, service, and commitment to learning
- Date: 11 Nissan
- 2025 date: 9 April
- 2026 date: 29 March
- 2027 date: 18 April
- 2028 date: 7 April
- Frequency: Annual

Education and Sharing Day is a day established by the United States Congress in honor of the Rebbe, Rabbi Menachem Mendel Schneerson. It calls for increased focus on education, and recognizes the lifelong efforts of the Rebbe for education. Since 1978, Education & Sharing Day, USA, has been proclaimed by the president each year on the Rebbe's birthday on the Jewish calendar, 11 Nissan, which is four days before Passover and thus generally can fall between March 21 and April 21 on the Gregorian calendar.

== History ==
In 1978, the U.S. Congress asked President Jimmy Carter to designate the Rebbe's birthday as the national Education and Sharing Day to recognize and pay tribute to his efforts for a better education for all American citizens.

The Rebbe was an advocate for children and spoke about the need for each child to be given an education that would offer them the opportunities to succeed. He spoke about the need for education to focus not only on academic achievements but also on character building. The Rebbe's emissaries established a network of several thousand Jewish schools and educational centers in the United States and across the globe.

The Rebbe often argued that the most important part of a child's education is instilling in him or her "[awareness of] a Supreme Being and a Law higher than man's" or "fear or love of a force greater than man".

To honor these accomplishments, his birth date has since been commemorated as Education & Sharing Day, U.S.A., by Congress and the President. Each year on that day, the President issues a proclamation which calls on American citizens to follow the example set by The Rebbe and focus on education and betterment of society.

The goal of Education and Sharing Day, in the Rebbe's words, is to: "Put greater emphasis on the promotion of fundamental human rights and obligations of justice and morality, which are the basis of any human society, if it is to be truly human and not turn into a jungle." It stresses the need for mindfulness in the general education system. The Rebbe called for local governing bodies and schools to join the call and attention given to this day, and to make a point out of it around the country and around the world, to the point, the Rebbe envisioned, it will become a nationally celebrated day, the same way Mother's Day and Father's day are celebrated.

There has been a recent movement to proclaim local Education and Sharing Days in States and Cities across the United States to correspond to the national occurrence. Education Day 2018 had the distinction of being proclaimed at the state level in all 50 States by the respective Governors or State Legislatures, in addition to the usual national proclamation by the President.

== Excerpts of texts of proclamations ==
President Ronald Reagan wrote in his proclamation of 1982:

One shining example for people of all faiths of what education ought to be is that provided by the Lubavitch movement, headed by Rabbi Menachem Schneerson, a worldwide spiritual leader who will celebrate his 80th birthday on April 4, 1982. The Lubavitcher Rebbe's work stands as a reminder that knowledge is an unworthy goal unless it is accompanied by moral and spiritual wisdom and understanding. He has provided a vivid example of the eternal validity of the Seven Noahide Laws, a moral code for all of us regardless of religious faith. May he go from strength to strength.

In recognition of the Lubavitcher Rebbe's 80th birthday, the Senate and the House of Representatives of the United States in Congress assembled have issued House Joint Resolution 447 to set aside April 4, 1982, as a "National Day of Reflection."

President George H. W. Bush wrote in his proclamation of 1989:

It is fitting that we honor Rabbi Schneerson and acknowledge his important contributions to society. Our great Nation takes just pride in its dedication to the principles of justice, equality, and truth. Americans also understand that we have a responsibility to inspire the same dedication in future generations. We owe a tremendous debt to Rabbi Schneerson and to all those who promote education that embraces moral and ethical values and emphasizes their importance.

In recognition of Rabbi Schneerson's vital efforts, and in celebration of his 87th birthday, the Congress, by House Joint Resolution 173, has designated April 16, 1989, and April 6, 1990, as "Education Day, U.S.A.

President Bill Clinton wrote in his proclamation of 1995:

"Rabbi Menachem Mendel Schneerson, the Lubavitcher Rebbe, well understood the importance of nurturing the heart along with the mind. Throughout his long and rich life, he believed that the education of our young people would only be successful if it sought to build character as well as intellect, if it taught the lessons of honesty, tolerance, and good citizenship, as well as language, math, and science.

This year, let us rededicate ourselves to teaching the love of learning that was championed by Rabbi Schneerson and is strengthened by caring leaders like him throughout our Nation. As we provide our students with the information and practical tools they need, let us also pass on to them the capacity for understanding that can help to give fuller meaning to their lives."

President George W. Bush wrote in his proclamation on Education and Sharing Day 2007:

"Education and Sharing Day honors The Rebbe and emphasizes our commitment to teach the next generation of Americans the values that make our country strong. The Lubavitcher Rabbi believes that society should 'make a new commitment to kindness,' and he helped to establish education and outreach centers offering social service programs and humanitarian aid around the world."

President Barack Obama wrote in his proclamation on Education & Sharing Day 2009:

"Few have better understood or more successfully promoted these ideas than Rabbi Menachem Mendel Schneerson, the Lubavitcher Rebbe, who emphasized the importance of education and good character. Through the establishment of educational and social service institutions across the country and the world, Rabbi Schneerson sought to empower young people and inspire individuals of all ages. On this day, we raise his call anew."

President Donald Trump wrote in his proclamation on Education & Sharing Day 2017:

"Education and Sharing Day recognizes the remarkable efforts of Rabbi Menachem Mendel Schneerson, the Lubavitcher Rebbe, to use values-based education to drive our Nation's children toward the American Dream. As an educator, Rabbi Schneerson understands that education is incomplete if it is devoid of moral development. Working through a spirit of optimism, he strived [sic] to teach children to be honest, civil, respectful of differences, and self-disciplined, in addition to being intellectually rigorous."

President Joe Biden wrote in his proclamation on Education and Sharing Day 2022:

"The Rebbe's work reminds us, in the words of the Prophet Amos, to "hate evil, love good, and establish justice in the gate." We each share a responsibility to live up to those words — in and out of the classroom — and to plant the seeds of love, kindness, and empathy in the hearts and minds of every child in America...Today — on what would have been the Rebbe's 120th birthday — let us celebrate all the educators, advocates, and pioneers who teach young people the lessons that create caring neighbors and closer communities."

The 1991 bill described the Noahide Laws as the "ethical values and principles which are the basis of civilized society and upon which our great Nation was founded".

In his 2006 proclamation, President George W. Bush called upon "government officials, educators, volunteers, and all the people of the United States to reach out to young people and work to create a better, brighter, and more hopeful future for all."

== See also ==
- Yud Aleph Nissan
- Seven Laws of Noah
- Chabad on Campus
