= Levi Yitzchak Schneerson =

Russian rabbi (1878–1944)

- Born: April 21, 1878; Poddobryanka, Mogilev Governorate, Russian Empire
- Died: August 9, 1944 (aged 66); Almaty, Kazakh SSR, USSR
- Occupations: Chief Rabbi of Yekaterinoslav, Russia
- Known for: Likkutei Levi Yitzchak on Kabbalah and Chabad philosophy
- Spouse: Chana Schneerson
- Children: Rabbi Menachem Mendel Schneerson; Yisroel Aryeh Leib Schneerson; Dovber Schneerson

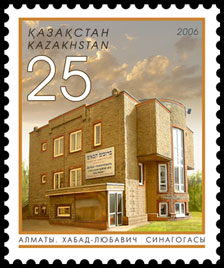
Chabad synagogue in Almaty, depicted on a Kazakh stamp

Levi Yitzchak Schneerson (April 21, 1878 – August 9, 1944) was a Russian Chabad-Lubavitch Hasidic rabbi in Yekaterinoslav, Russian Empire. He was the father of the seventh Chabad-Lubavitch Rebbe, Rabbi Menachem Mendel Schneerson.

== Early life ==
Schneerson was born on the 18th day of Nissan, 5638 (1878) in the town of Poddobryanka (near Gomel) to Rabbi Baruch Schneur and Zelda Rachel Schneerson (née Chaikin). His great-great-grandfather was the third Chabad rebbe, Menachem Mendel Schneersohn of Lubavitch.

In 1900, Schneerson married Chana Yanovsky, whose father, Rabbi Meir Shlomo Yanovsky, was the rabbi of Nikolaev. In 1902, their eldest son, Menachem Mendel, who become the rebbe of Lubavitch, was born.

== Chief rabbi of Yekaterinoslav and Soviet persecution ==
Schneerson lived in Nikolaev until 1909, when he was appointed to serve as the Rabbi of Yekaterinoslav.

In 1939 he was arrested by the communist regime for his fearless stance against the Party's efforts to eradicate Jewish learning and practice in the Soviet Union, and particularly for distributing Matzah to the Jews of Dnepropetrovsk (formerly Yekaterinoslav). After more than a year of torture and interrogations in Stalin's prisons, he was sentenced to exile to a remote village Chiali in Kazakhstan. Shortly before he died, Levi Yitzchak was able to move to Almaty, where he was warmly welcomed by the small Lubavitcher community.

== Death ==
On August 9, 1944, he died in Almaty. Schneerson was buried at a cemetery in Almaty. A Chabad Lubavitch synagogue named in his honor has been built near his gravesite. On August 10, 2020, his burial space was declared a Kazakh National Heritage site in cooperation with the U.S. Commission for the Preservation of America's Heritage Abroad.

== Legacy ==
Schneerson was a distinguished Kabbalist. Some of his writings, written on the margins of the scarce books available to him in exile, have been published in a five volume set under the name Likkutei Levi Yitschok. Most of it, however, was burned or confiscated by the Soviet authorities, and has yet to be returned to the Chabad movement.

After the fall of the Soviet Union, in 1991, the KGB admitted that Schneerson was framed.

In December 1999 the then President of Kazakhstan Nursultan Nazarbayev gave the complete KGB files on Schneerson to a group of Chabad Chassidim in New York City, and are now housed in the Library of Agudas Chassidei Chabad.
