= Chaya Mushka Schneerson =

Wife of Rebbe Menachem Mendel Schneerson (1901–1988)

Rebbetzin Chaya Mushka Schneerson
- Chaya Schneerson in the late 1950s
- Born: March 16, 1901; Babinovichi, Mogilev Governorate, Russian Empire
- Died: February 10, 1988 (aged 86); New York City, U.S.
- Resting place: Old Montefiore Cemetery, Queens, New York City, U.S.
- Spouse: Menachem Mendel Schneerson
- Father: Yosef Yitzchak Schneersohn

Chaya Mushka (Moussia) Schneerson (Yiddish: חיה מושקא שניאורסאן; March 16, 1901 – February 10, 1988), referred to by Lubavitchers as The Rebbetzin, was the wife of Menachem Mendel Schneerson, the seventh and last rebbe (spiritual leader) of the Chabad-Lubavitch branch of Hasidic Judaism. She was the second of three daughters of the sixth Lubavitcher rebbe, Yosef Yitzchok Schneersohn. She was named after the wife of the third Lubavitcher rebbe, Menachem Mendel Schneersohn.

== Biography ==
=== Early life ===
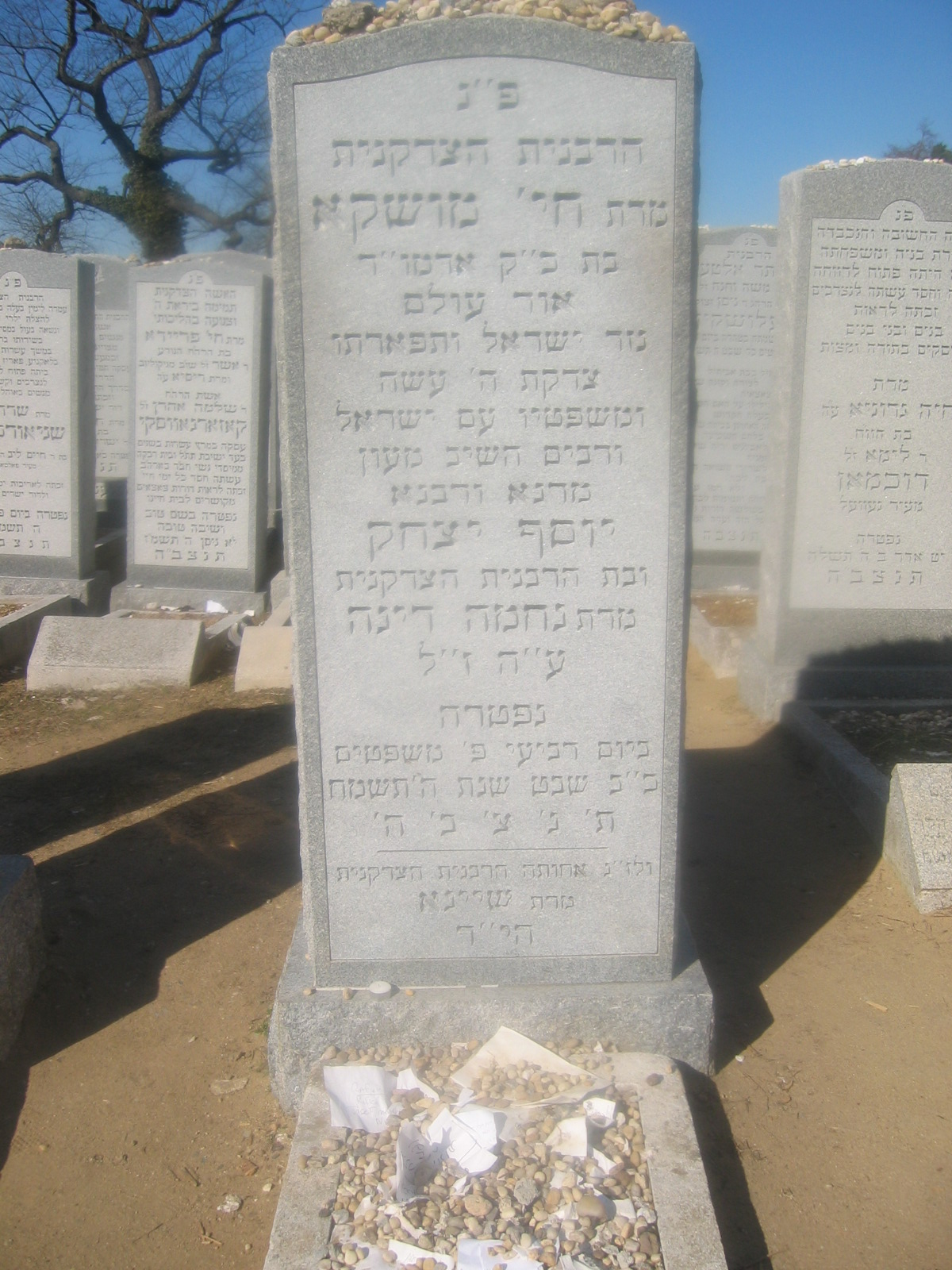
Chaya Mushka Schneerson's grave

She was born in Babinovichi, near the city of Lubavitch on Shabbat, the 25th of Adar of the year 5661 (16 March [O.S. 3 March] 1901). At the request of her grandfather, the fifth Lubavitcher rebbe Sholom Dovber Schneersohn, she was named Chaya Mushka after her great-great-grandmother, the wife of Menachem Mendel Schneersohn. She lived in Lubavitch until the autumn of 1915 when World War I forced her family to flee to Rostov. In 1920, on the death of her grandfather, her own father succeeded as the sixth Lubavitcher rebbe.

In May 1924, she moved with her family to Leningrad, where her father was forced to go after several years of being singled out for persecution by the local Jewish section of the Communist Party in Rostov. In the autumn of 1927, her father was imprisoned for disseminating Torah observance, and she participated in successful efforts to have him released. His sentence was commuted to exile, and Chaya Mushka accompanied her father to Kostroma. After his release, the Schneersohn family escaped the Soviet Union for Riga, Latvia.

=== Marriage ===
In 1928, she married her distant cousin, Menachem Mendel Schneerson in Warsaw, and they went to live in Berlin, where he studied at a local university. After the Nazis came to power in 1933, the couple fled to Paris. When Germany invaded France in 1940, they escaped on the Serpa Pinto – the last passenger ship to cross the Atlantic Ocean before a U-boat blockade began. They settled in the Crown Heights section of Brooklyn, New York, where many Lubavitcher Hasidim had preceded them. However, her younger sister Shaina Horenstein and Shaina's husband, Rabbi Menachem Mendel Horenstein, were trapped in occupied Poland and murdered by the Germans at Treblinka.

In 1950, her father died and her husband was formally appointed the seventh Lubavitcher rebbe.

In the court case over ownership of the Chabad Library, she testified according to the Chabad website: "My father, along with all his books, belong to the Chassidim."

=== Death ===
She died on February 10, 1988, 22nd of Shevat, 5748.

Soon after her death, her husband founded a charitable organization, Keren Ha'Chomesh (Chomesh is an acronym of Chaya Mushka Schneerson), primarily working in women's religious, social and educational programs. A campus of the Bais Rivka girls' school ("Campus Chomesh") was also named after her.

== Bibliography ==
- The Rebbetzin Chaya Mushka Schneersohn. A Brief Biography. Merkos L'Inyonei Chinuch: New York, 1999, 2004. ISBN 0-8266-0101-4
