= Ohel (Chabad-Lubavitch) =

Graves in New York City, United States

- אהל חב"ד ליובאוויטש
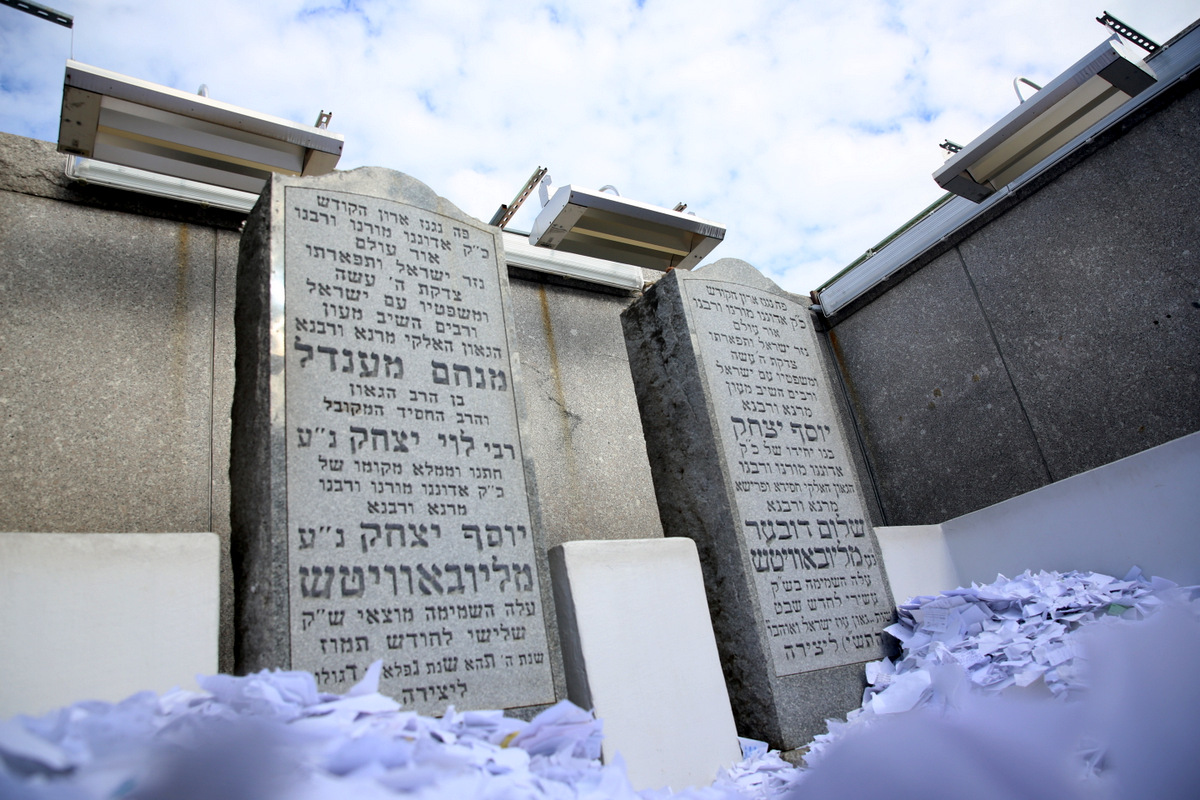
- Interior of the Ohel. The grave of Rabbi Yosef Yitzchak Schneersohn is at right; that of Rabbi Menachem Mendel Schneerson is at left
- Interactive map of Ohel (Chabad-Lubavitch)
- Location: 226-20 Francis Lewis Boulevard; Cambria Heights, New York
- Coordinates: 40.6860°N 73.7374°W
- Builder: Rabbi Chaim Boruch Halberstam
- Type: Tomb
- Visitors: 50,000 per year
- Website: Website

The Ohel (Hebrew: אהל, lit. 'tent') is an ohel (Jewish monumental tomb) in Cambria Heights, Queens, New York City, where Rabbi Menachem Mendel Schneerson and his father-in-law Rabbi Yosef Yitzchok Schneersohn, the two most recent rebbes of the Chabad-Lubavitch dynasty, are buried. Both Jews and non-Jews visit The Ohel for prayer, and approximately 50,000 people make an annual pilgrimage there on the anniversary of Schneerson's death.

== Description ==
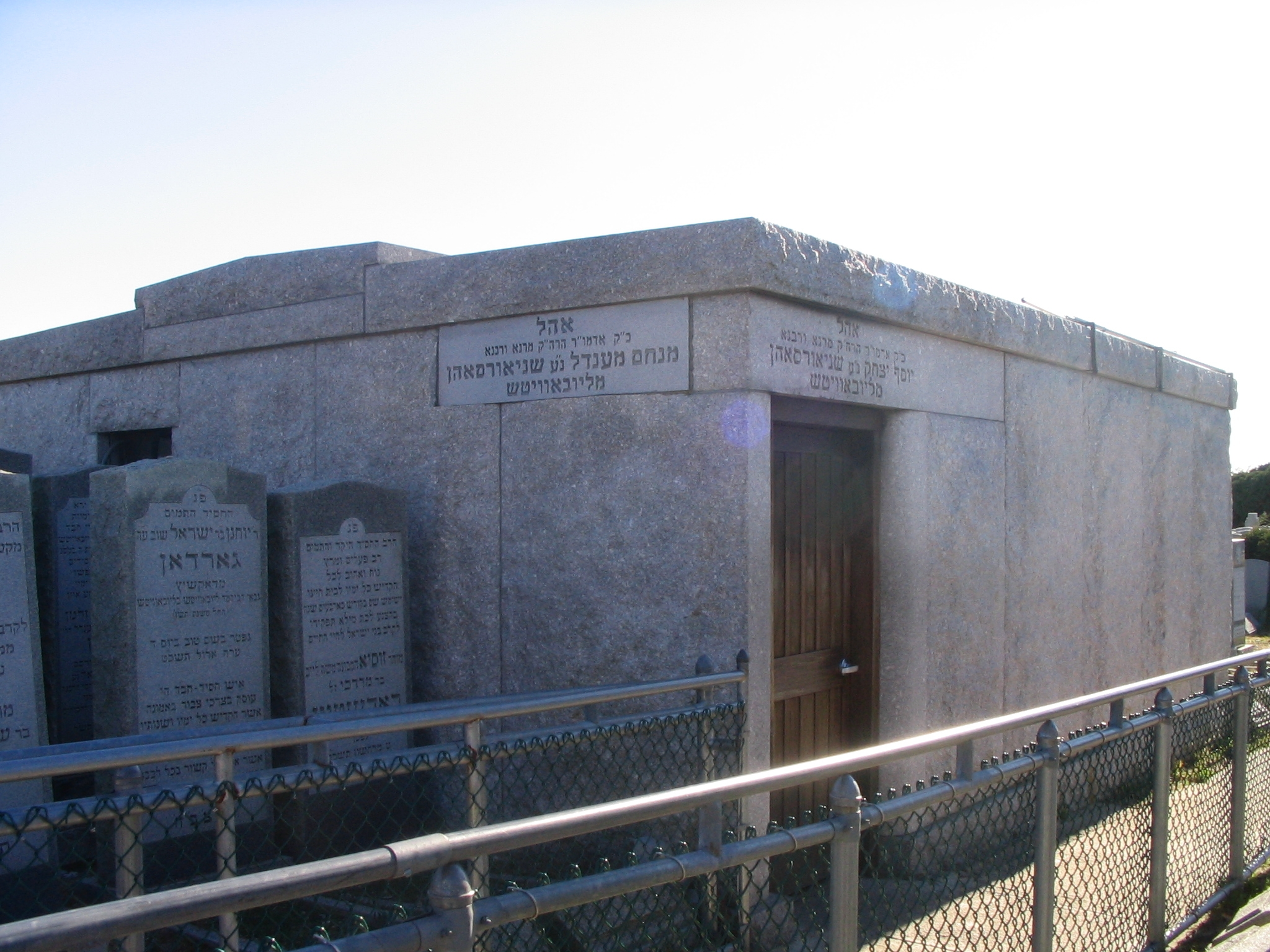
Exterior of the Ohel

The Ohel is located at Montefiore Cemetery (Old Springfield Cemetery) in Cambria Heights, Queens. The cemetery is a vestige of the large Jewish community that once inhabited Cambria Heights; the area is now largely African American.

The Ohel is situated at the northern edge of the cemetery, near the corner of Francis Lewis Boulevard and 121st Avenue, in a section designated for prominent Lubavitcher men and their wives. It is an open-air structure containing the side-by-side graves of Rabbi Yosef Yitzchak Schneersohn (1880–1950) and Rabbi Menachem Mendel Schneerson (1902–1994).

A row of small brick houses along Francis Lewis Boulevard abuts the cemetery. In 1995, Lubavitcher Hasidim bought one of these houses and turned it into a 24-hour visitors center. This center includes a video room, a library, a small synagogue, a quiet room for visitors to compose the prayers they will say in the Ohel, and refreshments. The entrance to the Ohel is through the back door of this house and down a pathway. Once inside the Ohel structure, men and women enter the actual gravesite through separate doors.

== History ==
Following the burial of Rabbi Yosef Yitzchak Schneersohn in the cemetery in 1950, his successor, Rabbi Menachem Mendel Schneerson, would visit his father-in-law's grave several times a week – as often as six days a week. He would read out the requests of people who had come to speak with him, then tear the notes and leave them at the gravesite. After the death of his wife in 1988, the Ohel was the only place Schneerson regularly visited outside Brooklyn. He suffered his first stroke at the Ohel in 1992.

Following Schneerson's death and burial at the Ohel in 1994, the number of visitors to the Ohel increased significantly. After Rabbi Schneerson's passing, Rabbi Chaim Boruch Halberstam founded and built the Chabad center near the tomb. The establishment of this visitors' center enabled people to write letters to Rabbi Schneerson and pray at the site. Today, tens of thousands of Jews visit the Ohel annually. It is also frequented by travelers going to or returning from nearby John F. Kennedy International Airport or 770 Eastern Parkway, the headquarters of Chabad in Crown Heights, Brooklyn.

The presence of large numbers of pilgrims, nighttime visitations, and the build-up of Chabad homes and facilities in the area has resulted in tension with the surrounding African-American community in the decades since Menachem Schneerson's death.

The Ohel has become a popular stop for politicians courting the hasidic vote including Donald Trump.

== Customs ==
At the Ohel, visitors have a tradition of writing kvitlach – prayers on small pieces of paper – which are then torn up and tossed onto the graves. In the visitor center, a fax machine receives more than 700 faxes a day, while a computer receives 400 e-mails daily. These kvitlach are printed, torn into shreds, and placed atop the graves. When the pile grows too high, the shredded notes are burned. The visitor center also receives many wedding invitations for Menachem Schneerson which are read at and/or placed on the graves. In addition to kvitlach, visitors are encouraged to light memorial candles at the Ohel.

Visitors to the Ohel customarily light candles on shelves in the antechamber. Visitors also write letters to Menachem Schneerson beforehand and read them beside the graves, then rip them up and leave them on the graves.

== Kohanim ==
According to Jewish law, a kohen (hereditary Jewish priest) is not allowed to ritually defile himself by entering a cemetery. Halacha mandates that the kohen be a distance of four cubits from a grave unless separated by a fence. The construction of fencing along the pathway leading to it makes it possible for kohanim to enter the Ohel.

At the Ohel itself, the graves are enclosed by 4 walls, but with an open roof to eliminate problems of tumas meis ("impurity from the dead"; see Tumah and taharah) in an enclosure, and a low wall surrounds the graves and keeps the kohen at least 12.59 inches (320 mm) away from a tombstone to maintain his ritual purity.

== Gallery ==
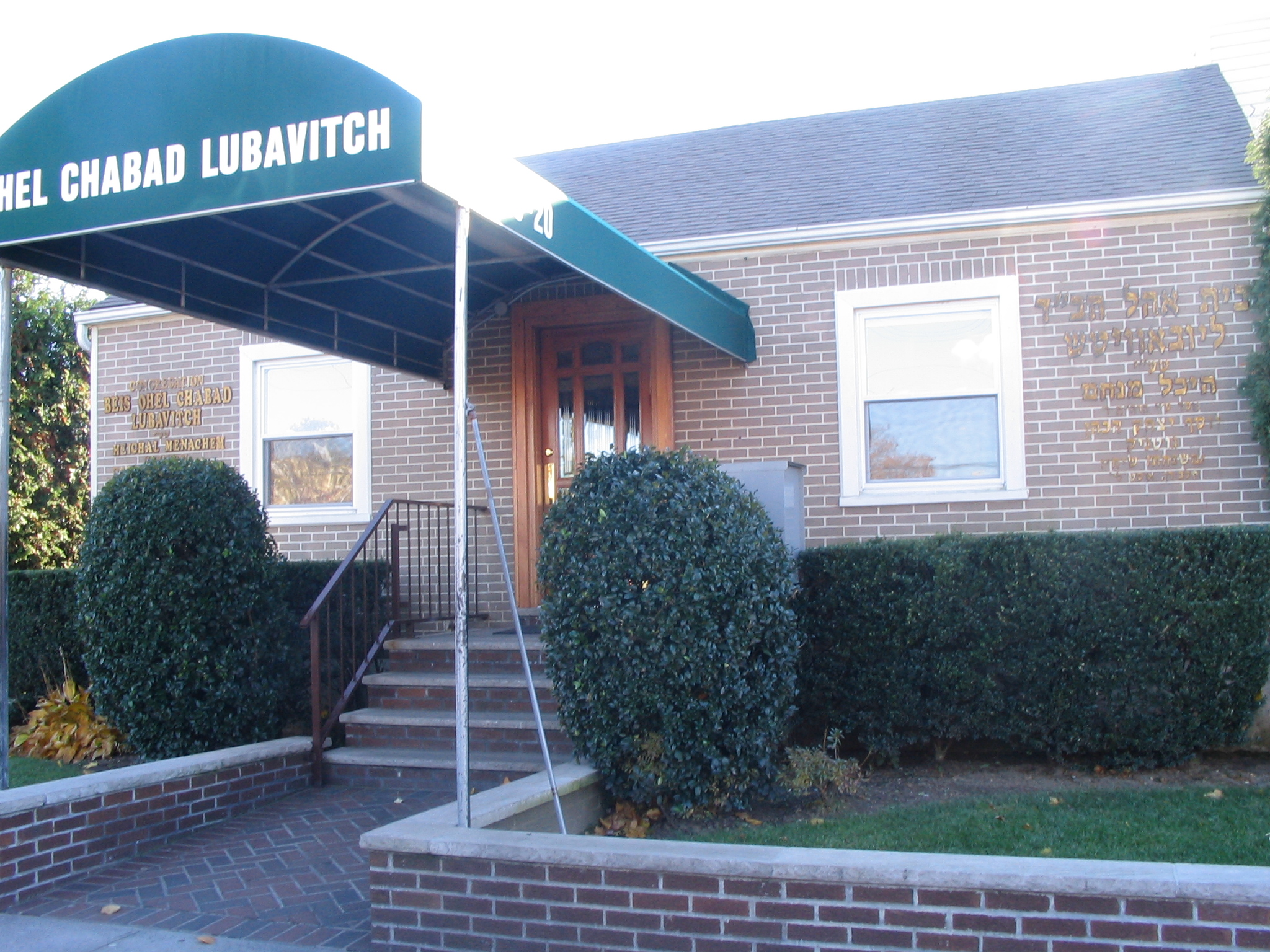
Welcome center

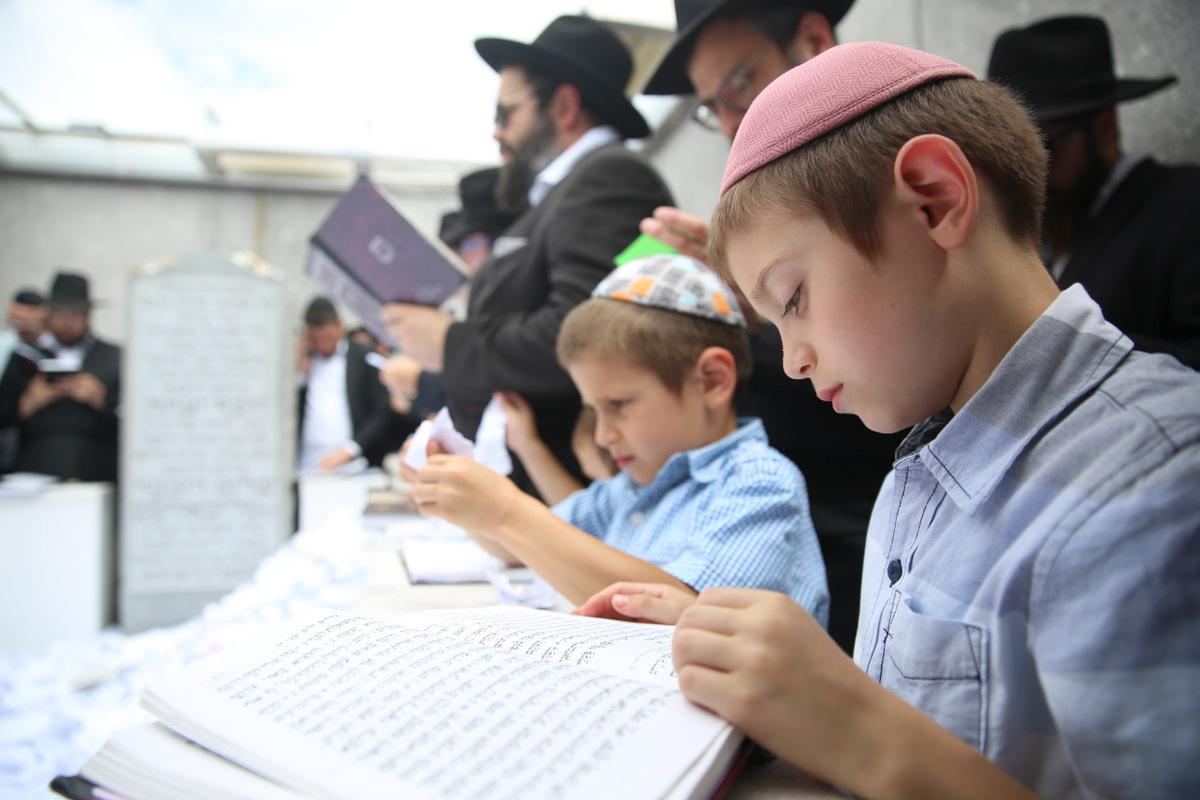
Children praying

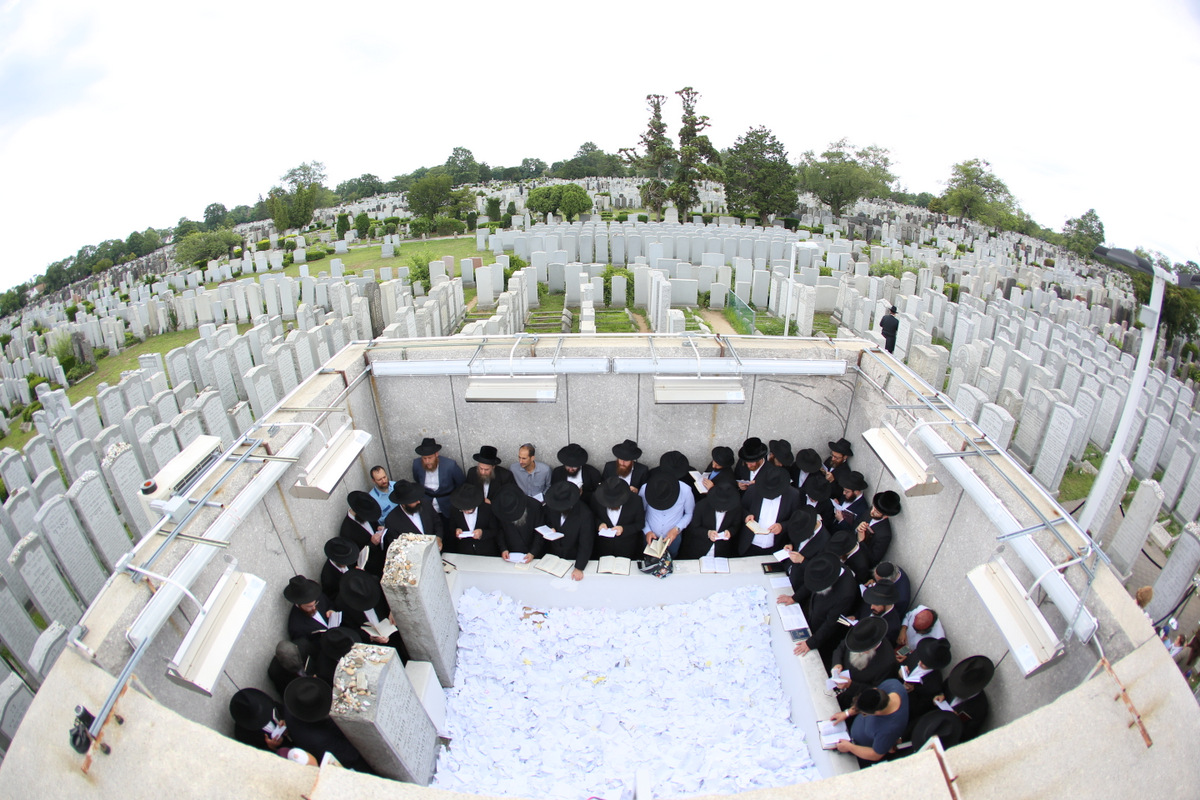
Aerial view

== See also ==
- Ohel (grave)
- Gimmel Tammuz
