= Menachem Mendel Schneerson =

Seventh Chabad Rebbe (1902–1994)

Rabbi Menachem Mendel Schneerson
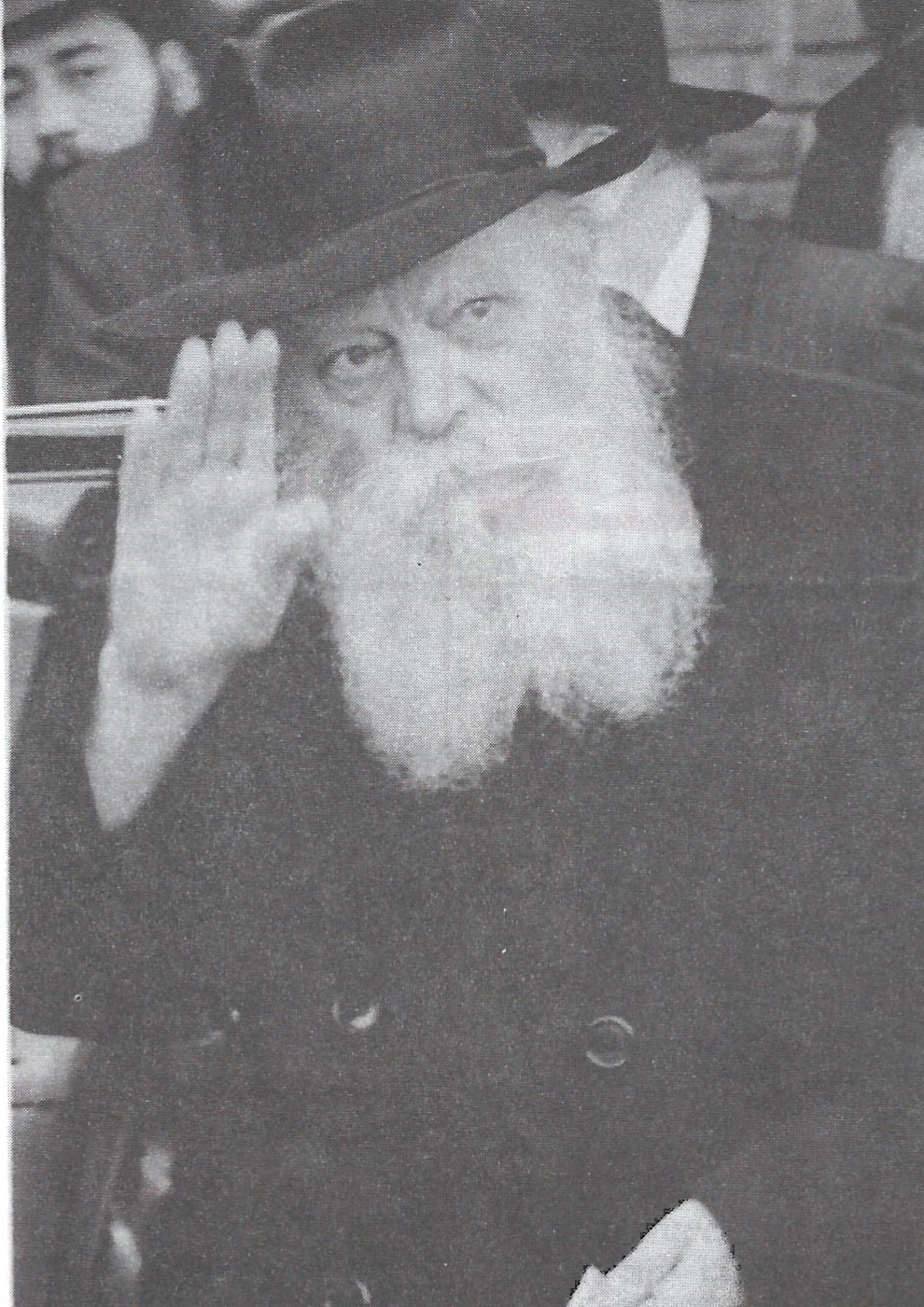
- Schneerson in 1992
- Title: Lubavitcher Rebbe

Personal life
- Born: April 18, 1902 Nikolaev, Kherson Governorate, Russian Empire
- Died: June 12, 1994 (aged 92) Manhattan, New York City, U.S.
- Buried: Queens, New York City, U.S.
- Spouse: Chaya Mushka Schneerson
- Parents: Levi Yitzchak Schneerson (father); Chana Yanovski Schneerson (mother)
- Dynasty: Chabad Lubavitch
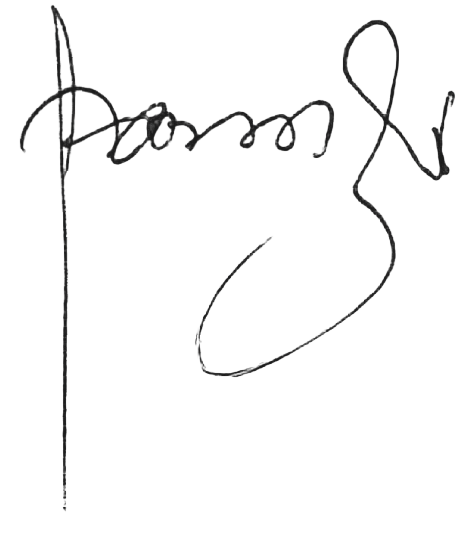
- Signature

Religious life
- Religion: Judaism

Jewish leader
- Predecessor: Yosef Yitzchak Schneersohn
- Synagogue: 770 Eastern Parkway, Brooklyn, New York City
- Began: January 17, 1951
- Yahrtzeit: 3 Tammuz 5754
- Residence: Brooklyn, New York City
- Dynasty: Chabad Lubavitch
- Semikhah: Joseph Rosen; Yechiel Yaakov Weinberg; Shmuel Schneerson

Menachem Mendel Schneerson (Note: Yiddish: מנחם מענדל שניאורסאָהן; Russian: Менахем-Мендл Шнеерсон, romanized: Menakhem-Mendl Shneyerson; Hebrew: מנחם מנדל שניאורסון) (April 18 [O.S. April 5] 1902 – June 12, 1994), known to adherents of the Chabad-Lubavitch movement as the Lubavitcher Rebbe or simply the Rebbe, was an Orthodox rabbi, alleged Messiah claimant, and the Rebbe of the Lubavitch Hasidic dynasty. He is considered one of the most influential Jewish leaders of the 20th century.

As leader of the Chabad-Lubavitch movement, he took an insular Hasidic group that almost came to an end with the Holocaust and transformed it into one of the most influential movements in religious Jewry, with an international network of over 5,000 educational and social centers. The institutions he established include kindergartens, schools, drug-rehabilitation centers, care homes for disabled people, and synagogues.

Schneerson's published teachings fill more than 400 volumes, and he is noted for his contributions to Jewish continuity and religious thought, as well as his wide-ranging contributions to traditional Torah scholarship. He is recognized as the pioneer of Jewish outreach. During his lifetime, many of his adherents believed that he was the Messiah, though not all Chabadniks subscribe to this belief. His own attitude to the subject, and whether he proclaimed it, is hotly debated among academics and scholars of Judaism. During Schneerson's lifetime, the messianic controversy and other issues elicited fierce criticism from many quarters in the Orthodox world, from Israel's Chief Rabbi Ovadia Yosef to Elazar Shach.

In 1978, the U.S. Congress asked President Jimmy Carter to designate Schneerson's birthday as the national Education Day in the U.S. It has been since commemorated as Education and Sharing Day. In 1994, Schneerson was posthumously awarded the Congressional Gold Medal for his "outstanding and lasting contributions toward improvements in world education, morality, and acts of charity". Schneerson's resting place attracts Jews for prayer.

== Biography ==
=== Early life and education ===
Menachem Mendel Schneerson was born on April 18, 1902 (April 5, 1902 OS; 11 Nisan, AM 5662), in the Black Sea port of Nikolaev in the Russian Empire (now Mykolaiv in Ukraine). His father was rabbi Levi Yitzchak Schneerson, a renowned Talmudic scholar and authority on Kabbalah and Jewish law. His mother was Rebbetzin Chana Schneerson (née Yanovski). He was named after the third Chabad rebbe Menachem Mendel Schneersohn, the Tzemach Tzedek, from whom he was a direct patrilineal descendant.

In 1907, when Schneerson was five years old, the family moved to Yekaterinoslav, where Levi Yitzchak was appointed Chief Rabbi of the city. He served until 1939, when he was exiled by the Soviets for five years to Kazakhstan for his activities on behalf of strengthening Judaism in the Soviet Union. Schneerson had two younger brothers: Dov Ber Schneerson, who was murdered in 1944 by Nazi collaborators, and Yisroel Aryeh Leib Schneerson, who died in 1952 while completing doctoral studies at Liverpool University.

During his youth, he received a private education and was tutored by Zalman Vilenkin from 1909 through 1913. When Schneerson was 11 years old, Vilenkin informed his father that he had nothing more to teach his son. At that point, Levi Yitzchak began teaching his son Talmud and rabbinic literature, as well as Kabbalah. Schneerson proved gifted in both Talmudic and Kabbalistic study and also took exams as an external student of the local Soviet school. He was considered an illui and genius, and by the time he was 17, he had mastered the entire Talmud, some 5,422 pages, as well as all its early commentaries.

Throughout his childhood, Schneerson was involved in the affairs of his father's office. He was also said to have acted as an interpreter between the Jewish community and the Russian authorities on a number of occasions. Levi Yitzchak's courage and principles guided his son for the rest of his life. Many years later, when he once reminisced about his youth, Schneerson said, "I have the education of the first-born son of the rabbi of Yekaterinoslav. When it comes to saving lives, I speak up whatever others may say."

Schneerson went on to receive separate rabbinical ordinations from the Rogatchover Gaon, Joseph Rosen, and Yechiel Yaakov Weinberg, author of Sridei Aish.

Ancestors of Menachem Mendel Schneerson

4. Rabbi Baruch Schneur
2. Rabbi Levi Yitzchak Schneerson
5. Zelda Rachel Chaikin
1. Rabbi Menachem Mendel Schneerson
12. Rabbi Yisrael Leib Yanovsky
6. Rabbi Meir Shlomo Yanovsky
13. Bella Rivka Lavut
3. Chana Schneerson
14. Rabbi Yitzchak Poshnitz
7. Rachel Poshnitz

=== Marriage and family life ===
In 1923, Schneerson visited the sixth Chabad-Lubavitch Rebbe, Yosef Yitzchak Schneersohn, for the first time. He met the rabbi's middle daughter Chaya Mushka, who was a distant cousin. Sometime later, they became engaged but were not married until 1928 in Warsaw, Poland. Taking great pride in his son-in-law's outstanding scholarship, Yosef Yitzchak asked him to engage in learned conversation with the great Torah scholars present at the wedding, such as Meir Shapiro and Menachem Ziemba. Menachem Mendel and Chaya Mushka were married for 60 years and were childless.

Menachem Mendel and Yosef Yitzchak were both descendants of Menachem Mendel Schneersohn, known as the Tzemach Tzedek, the third Rebbe of Chabad. Schneerson later commented that the day of his marriage bound the community to him and him to the community.

In 1947, Schneerson traveled to Paris to take his mother, Chana Schneerson, back to New York City with him. Schneerson would visit her every day and twice each Friday to also prepare her tea. In 1964, Chana Schneerson died.

On February 10, 1988, Schneerson's wife Chaya Mushka died. After the traditional year of Jewish mourning had passed on her Yahrzheit, the widowed Schneerson moved into his study above the central Lubavitch synagogue on Eastern Parkway.

=== Berlin ===
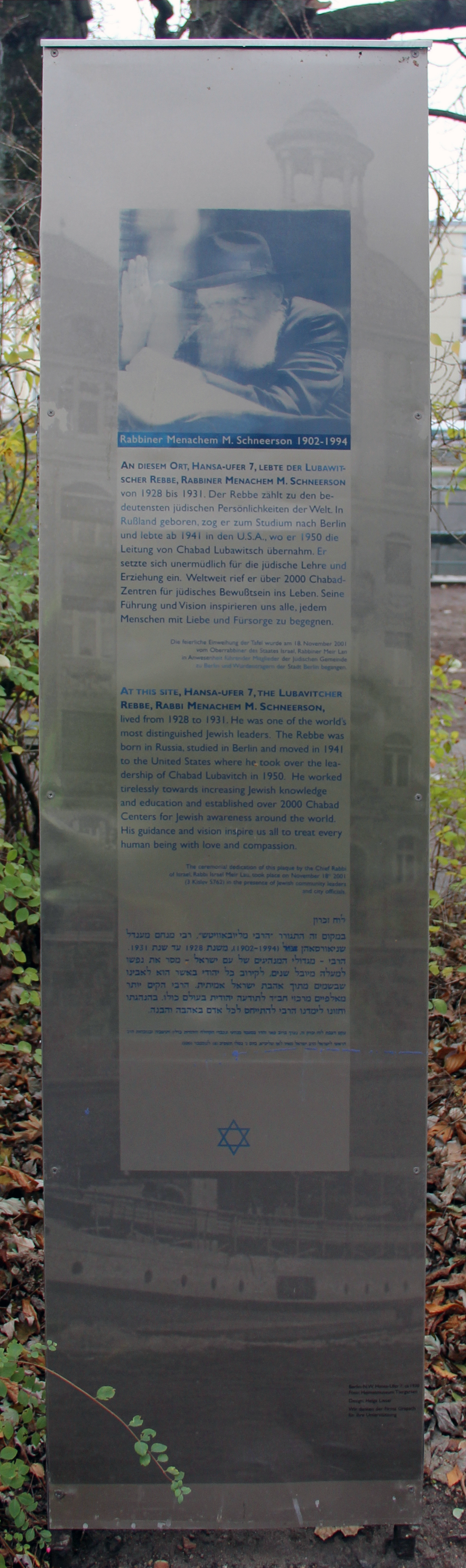
A monument for Schneerson in Berlin

After his wedding to Chaya Mushka in 1928, Schneerson and his wife moved to Berlin in the Weimar Republic (now part of Germany), where he was assigned specific communal tasks by his father-in-law, who also requested that he write scholarly annotations to the responsa (also known as teshuvot) and various Hasidic discourses of the earlier Rebbes of Chabad-Lubavitch. Schneerson studied higher mathematics, physics, and philosophy at the University of Berlin, and reportedly in his philosophy class he scored the highest grade in the history of the university. He would later recall that he enjoyed Erwin Schrödinger's lectures. His father-in-law facilitated his secular studies, including paying his tuition expenses. This proved useful later as HIAS advised him to emphasize his engineering background when immigrating To the United States in 1941.

During his stay in Berlin, his father-in-law encouraged him to become more of a public figure. However, Schneerson described himself as an introvert and was known to have pleaded with acquaintances not to make a fuss over the fact that he was the son-in-law of Yosef Yitzchak.

While in Berlin, Schneerson met Joseph B. Soloveitchik, and the two formed a friendship that remained between them years later when they emigrated to America. He wrote hundreds of pages of his own original Torah discourses, and conducted a serious interchange of halachic correspondence with many of Eastern Europe's leading rabbinic figures, including Joseph Rosen. In 1933, he also met with Chaim Elazar Spira, as well as with Talmudist Shimon Shkop. During this time, he kept a diary in which he would carefully document his private conversations with his father-in-law, as well as his kabbalistic correspondence with his father, Levi Yitzchak.

=== Paris ===
In 1933, after the Nazis took over Germany, the Schneersons left Berlin and moved to Paris, where Menachem Mendel (known as "RaMash" before accepting the leadership of Chabad) continued his religious and communal activities on behalf of his father-in-law.

While in Paris, he took a two-year course in mechanical and electrical engineering at a vocational college. After this, he studied mathematics at the prestigious Sorbonne University.

During that time, Yosef Yitzchak recommended that Professor Alexander Vasilyevitch Barchenko consult with Schneerson regarding various religious and mystical matters, and prominent rabbis, such as Yerachmiel Binyaminson and Eliyahu Eliezer Dessler, turned to Schneerson with their rabbinic and kabbalistic queries.

On June 11, 1940, three days before Paris fell to the Nazis, the Schneersons fled to Vichy and later to Nice, where they stayed until their final escape from Europe in 1941.

=== New York ===
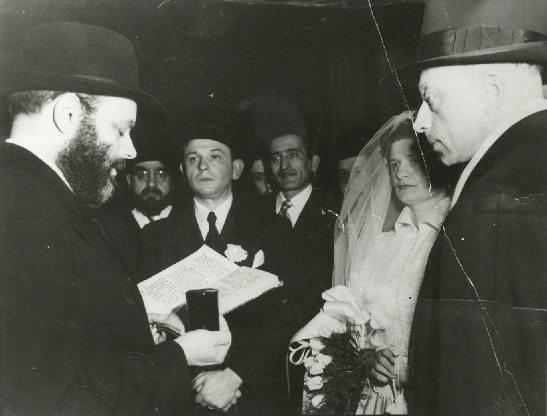
Menachem Mendel Schneerson officiating at a wedding ceremony

In 1941, Schneerson escaped from Europe via Lisbon, Portugal. On the eve of his departure, Schneerson penned a treatise where he revealed his vision for the future of world Jewry and humanity. He and his wife, Chaya Mushka, arrived in New York on June 23, 1941.

Shortly after his arrival, his father-in-law appointed him director and chairman of the three Chabad central organizations, Merkos L'Inyonei Chinuch, Machneh Israel and Kehot Publication Society, placing him at the helm of the movement's Jewish educational, social services, and publishing networks. Over the next decade, Yosef Yitzchak referred many of the scholarly questions that had been inquired of him to his son-in-law. He became increasingly known as a personal representative of Yosef Yitzchak.

During the 1940s, Schneerson became a naturalized US citizen and, seeking to contribute to the war effort, he volunteered at the Brooklyn Navy Yard, using his electrical engineering background to draw wiring diagrams for the battleship USS Missouri (BB-63), and was tasked with a highly responsible job of supervising and verifying the complex electrical work on military ships, among other classified military work.

In 1942, Schneerson launched the Merkos Shlichus program, where he would send pairs of yeshiva students to remote locations across the country during their summer vacations to teach Jews in isolated communities about their heritage and offer education to their children.

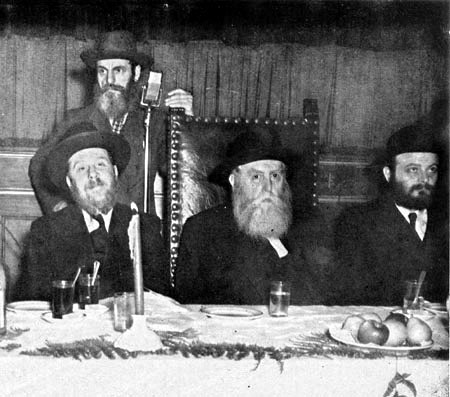
A dinner for the Tomchei Tmimim Yeshiva network in 1943, from right to left: Menachem Mendel Schneerson, his father-in-law Yosef Yitzchak Schneersohn, and his brother-in-law Shemaryahu Gurary

As chairman and editor-in-chief of Kehot, Schneerson published the works of the earlier Rebbes of Chabad. He also published his own works, including the Hayom Yom in 1943 and Hagadda in 1946.

On a visit to Paris in 1947, Schneerson established a school for girls and worked with local organizations to assist with housing for refugees and displaced persons. He often explained that his goal was to "make the world a better place" and to do what he could to eliminate all suffering. In a letter to Israeli President Yitzchak Ben Tzvi, Schneerson wrote that when he was a child the vision of the future redemption began to take form in his imagination "a redemption of such magnitude and grandeur through which the purpose of the suffering, the harsh decrees and annihilation of exile will be understood ..."

In 1991, a car in convoy with Schneerson's motorcade accidentally struck two Guyanese American children while running a red light. One of the children was killed. The incident triggered the Crown Heights riot.

=== Seventh Chabad Rebbe ===
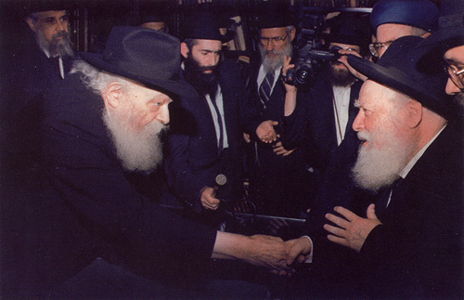
The Ashkenazi Chief Rabbis of Israel, Avraham Elkana Kahana Shapira and Mordechai Eliyahu at the Lubavitcher rebbe on the 11th of Iyar 5749 (May 16, 1989)

After the death of Yosef Yitzchak Schneersohn in 1950, Chabad followers began persuading Schneerson to succeed his father-in-law as Rebbe, citing his scholarship, piety, and dynasty. Schneerson was reluctant, and refused to accept leadership of the movement. He continued, however, with all the communal activities he had previously headed. It would take a full year for the elders to persuade him to join the movement in accepting the post.

On the first anniversary (yahrzeit) of his father-in-law's passing, 10 Shevat 5711 (January 17, 1951), Schneerson took on the role at a ceremony attended by several hundred rabbis and Jewish leaders from all parts of the United States and Canada. He delivered a Hasidic discourse (Ma'amar), the equivalent to a President-elect taking the oath of office, and formally became the Rebbe. In the ma’amar, known as "Bosi L'gani" (I have come into My garden), the Rebbe stated his mission: to bring the Messiah ("Moshiach"). On the night of his acceptance, members of the Israeli Cabinet and the Chief Rabbi of Israel, Yitzhak HaLevi Herzog, sent him congratulatory messages.

Reiterating a longstanding core Chabad principle at his inaugural talk, he demanded that each individual exert themselves in advancing spiritually and not rely on the Rebbe to do it for them, saying:

Now listen, Jews. Generally, in Chabad, it has been demanded that each work on themselves, and not rely on the Rebbes. One must, on their own, transform the folly of materialism and the passion of the 'animal soul' to holiness. I do not, God Forbid, recuse myself from assisting as much as possible, however; if one does not work on themselves, what good will submitting notes, singing songs, and saying lechayim do?

At the same talk, Schneerson said, "one must go to a place where nothing is known of Godliness, nothing is known of Judaism, nothing is even known of the Hebrew alphabet, and while there to put oneself aside and ensure that the other calls out to God." When he spoke to The Forward journalist Asher Penn that year, he said, "...we must stop insisting that Judaism is in danger, an assertion that does little but place Jewry on the defensive. We need to go on the offensive."

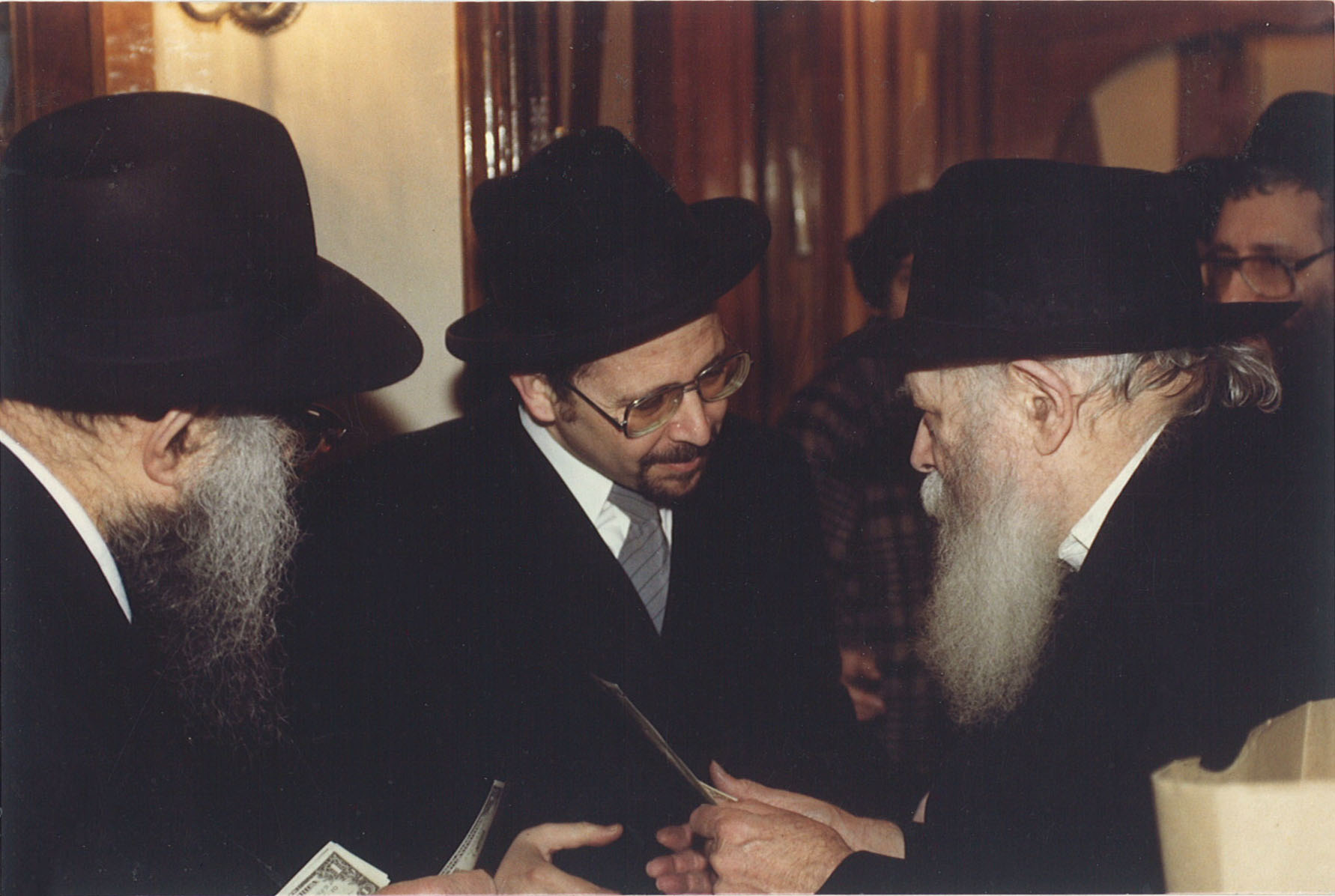
Aharon Daum (center) talks with the Rebbe (right) during the distribution of dollars for charity.

As Rebbe, Schneerson would receive visitors for private meetings, known as yechidus, on Sunday and Thursday evenings. Those meetings would begin at 8 pm and often continue until 5 or 6 in the morning, and were open to everyone. Schneerson, who spoke several languages including English, Yiddish, Hebrew, Aramaic, French, Russian, German, and Italian, would converse with people on all issues and offer his advice on both spiritual and mundane matters. Politicians and leaders from across the globe came to meet him, but Schneerson showed no preference for one person over another. His secretary once even declined to admit John F. Kennedy because Schneerson was already meeting people who had requested appointments months previously. Those meetings were discontinued in 1982, when it became impossible to accommodate many people. Meetings were then held only for those with a special occasion, such as a bride and groom for a wedding or a boy and his family for a bar mitzvah.

During his four decades as Rebbe, Schneerson would deliver regular addresses centered on the weekly Torah portion and on various tractates of the Talmud. These talks, delivered without text or notes, would last for several hours, and sometimes went for eight or nine hours without a break. During the talks, Schneerson demonstrated a unique approach to explaining seemingly different concepts by analyzing the fundamental principle common to the entire tractate. and referenced both classic and esoteric sources from all periods, citing entire sections by heart.

=== Outreach, spiritual campaigns ===
==== Women and girls ====
In 1951, Schneerson established a Chabad women's and girl's organization and a youth organization in Israel. Their mission was to engage in outreach exclusively directed at women and teens. In 1953, he opened branches of these organizations in New York, London, and Toronto. Schneerson equally addressed his teachings to both genders in a marked departure from an entrenched tendency to limit high-level Torah education to men and boys. He addressed meetings of the organizations and led gatherings exclusively for women. Schneerson would describe the increase in Torah study by women as one of the "positive innovations of the later generations".

==== International outreach ====
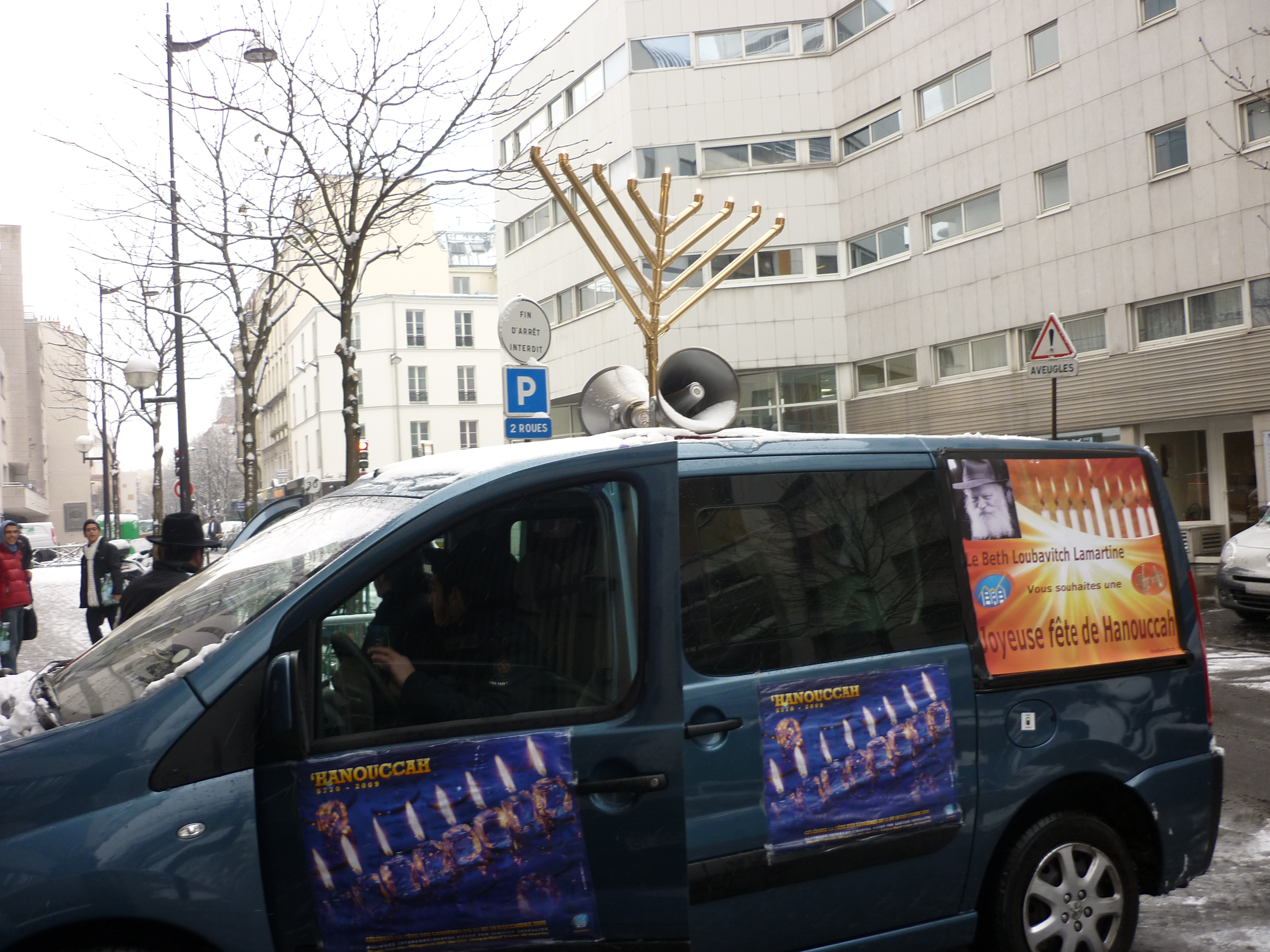
Local Chabad house drives around Paris promote interest in Hanukkah services

That same year, Schneerson sent his first emissary to Morocco and established schools and a synagogue for the Moroccan Jewish community. In 1958, Schneerson established schools and synagogues in Detroit, Michigan; Milan, Italy; and London. Beginning in the 1960s, Schneerson instituted a system of "mitzvah campaigns" to encourage Jews in the observance of ten basic Jewish practices, such as tefillin for men, Shabbat candles for women, and loving your fellow. Schneerson's campaign brought the concept of tefillin to Jewish men everywhere, and he has been referred to as "the great modern popularizer of tefillin". Until his campaign, tefillin was largely the domain of the meticulously observant.

Following the death of his mother, Chana Schneerson, in 1964, Schneerson began to offer an additional weekly sermon in her memory. These sermons consisted of original insights and unprecedented analysis of Rashi's Torah commentary, delivered at regular public gatherings. Schneerson delivered these sermons weekly until 1992.

==== Hanukkah campaign ====
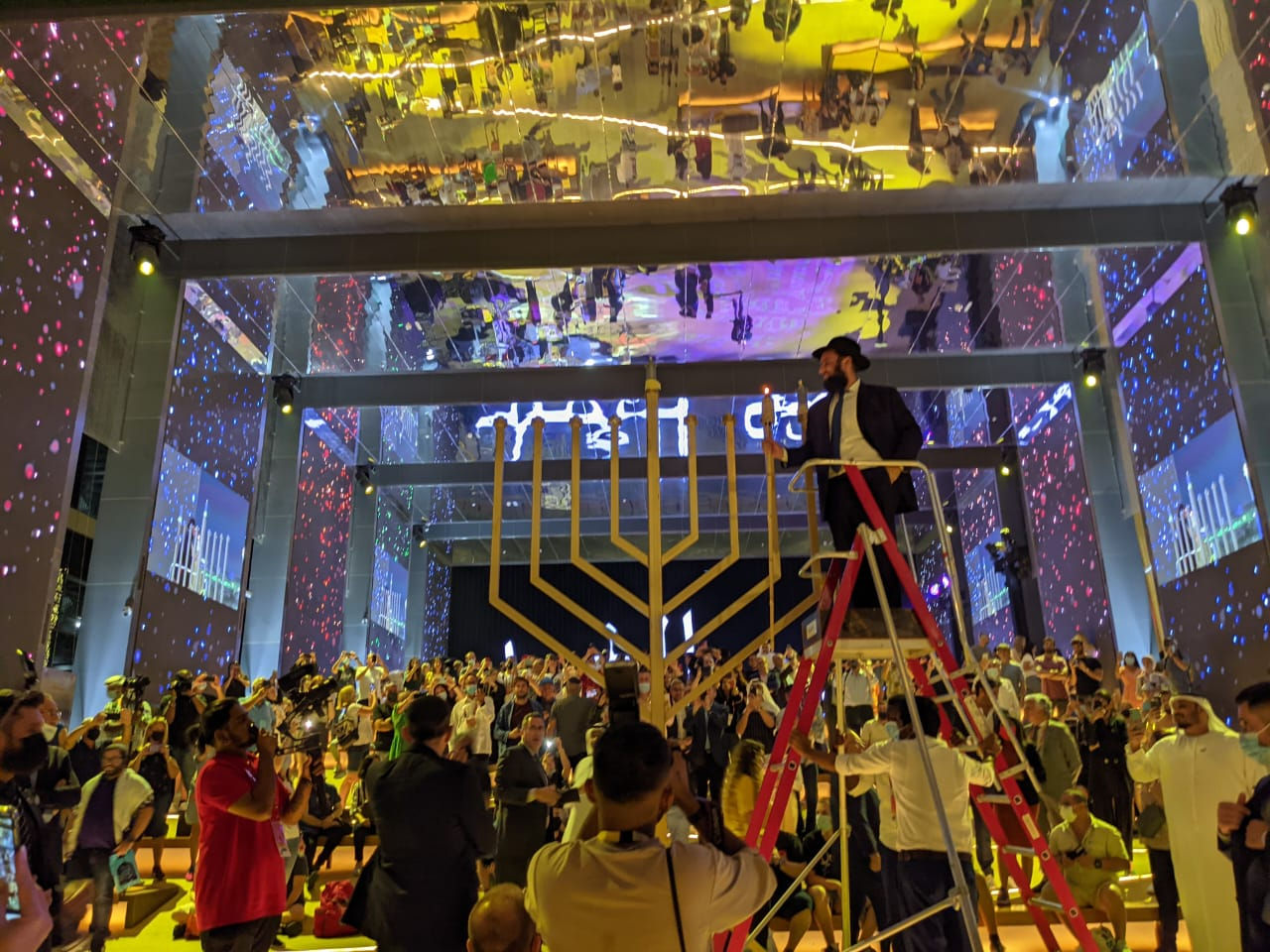
Public Menorah lighting in Dubai

In 1973, Schneerson started a Hanukkah campaign to encourage all Jews worldwide to light their own menorah. After all-tin menorahs were given out that year, a military manufacturer was commissioned to distribute tens of thousands of additional menorahs. In 1974, a public lighting of a Hanukkah menorah was held at the Liberty Bell in Philadelphia, Pennsylvania, and in the years that followed, menorah lightings on public grounds were held in cities worldwide. Legal challenges to the lighting on public grounds reached the Supreme Court of the United States, and it was ruled that public lighting did not violate the Constitution of the United States. Public lightings continue in thousands of cities today.

==== Lag BaOmer parade ====
Chabad established an annual Lag BaOmer parade at '770', one of the largest celebrations of its kind, where thousands of Jews celebrate the holiday.

==== Iran youth immigration ====
In 1979, during the Iranian Revolution and Iranian hostage crisis, Schneerson directed arrangements to rescue Jewish youth and teenagers from Iran and bring them to safety in the United States. Schneerson saw the Iranian government's hostility towards the United States as behavior that could threaten the country's status as an "untouchable" superpower, and that would cause it to try to appease Arab countries, thus "endanger[ing] the security of Israel". As a result of Schneerson's efforts, several thousand Iranian Jewish children were flown from Iran to the safety of New York.

==== Noahidism and Jewish outreach ====
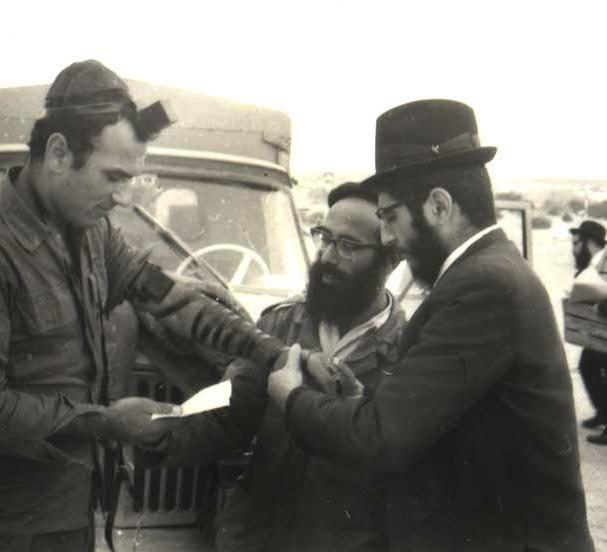
Chabad Chassidim wrapping Teffilin with Jewish strangers on the street

In 1983, Schneerson launched a global campaign to promote awareness of Monotheism and observance of the Noahide Laws among all people, arguing that this was the basis for human rights for all civilization, and stressing that they shouldn't be fulfilled because human logic compels one to do so, but rather because they are God's commands transmitted through Moses. Several times each year his addresses were broadcast on national television. On these occasions, Schneerson would address the public on general communal affairs.

In 1984, Schneerson initiated a campaign for the daily study of Maimonides's Mishneh Torah. Each year after the learning cycle there is Siyum celebration marking the end of the cycle and beginning of the new one. Many Jewish leaders have attended these events.

==== Sunday office hours for charity ====
In 1986, Schneerson began a custom where, each Sunday, he would stand outside his office, greet people briefly, give them a dollar bill, and encourage them to donate it to the charity of their choice. Explaining his reason for encouraging charitable giving among all people, Schneerson quoted his father-in-law, who said that "when two people meet, it should bring benefit to a third." People in line would often take this opportunity to ask Schneerson for advice or request a blessing. Thousands of people attended this event each week, which lasted up to six hours, and is often referred to as "Sunday Dollars".

Schneerson's wife, Chaya Mushka Schneerson, died in 1988. During the week of shiva, Schneerson wrote a will in which he bequeathed his entire estate to Agudas Chasidei Chabad, the Chabad umbrella organization.

During a talk in 1991, Schneerson spoke passionately about Moshiach (the Messiah) and told his followers that he had done all that he could bring world peace and redemption but that it was now up to them to continue this task: "I have done my part, from now on you do all that you can." A few months later, when a reporter from CNN came to meet him at a Sunday Dollars, he said, "Moshiach is ready to come now; it is only on our part to do something additional in the realm of goodness and kindness."

==== His message: become righteous ====
On Sunday, March 1, 1992, Gabriel Erem, the editor of Lifestyles Magazine, told Schneerson that on his ninetieth birthday, they would be publishing a special issue and wanted to know his message to the world. Schneerson replied that "'Ninety', in Hebrew, is tzaddik; which means 'righteous.' And that is a direct indication for every person to become a real tzaddik—a righteous person, and to do so for many years, until 120. This message applies equally to Jews and non-Jews".

=== Work habits ===
During his decades of leadership, Schneerson worked over 18 hours a day and never took a day of vacation. He rarely left Brooklyn except for visits to his father-in-law's gravesite in Queens, New York. Schneerson opposed retirement, seeing it as a waste of precious years. In 1972, on the occasion of his 70th birthday, instead of announcing a retirement plan, Schneerson proposed the establishment of 71 new institutions to mark the beginning of the 71st year of his life. The only other time he left Brooklyn was when he visited Camp Gan Israel Parksville, New York in 1956, 1957 and 1960.

=== Illness and death ===
In 1977, during the hakafot ceremony on Shemini Atzeret, Schneerson suffered a heart attack. At his request, rather than transporting him to a hospital, the doctors set up a mini-hospital at his office where he was treated for the next four weeks by doctors Bernard Lown, Ira Weiss, and Larry Resnick. He made a full recovery from the heart attack with few, if any, noticeable lasting effects or changes to his work habits. Fifteen years later, Schneerson suffered a serious stroke while praying at the grave of his father-in-law. The stroke left him unable to speak and paralyzed on the right side of his body. The hope that Schneerson could be revealed as the Messiah became more widespread during this time.

On the morning of June 12, 1994, Schneerson died at the Beth Israel Medical Center in New York city, and was buried at the Ohel next to his father-in-law, Yosef Yitzchak Schneersohn, at Montefiore Cemetery in Queens, New York. Shortly after Schneerson's death, the executors of his will discovered several notebooks in a drawer in his office, in which Schneerson had written his scholarly thoughts and religious musings from his earliest years. The majority of entries in these journals date between 1928 and 1950 and were subsequently published.

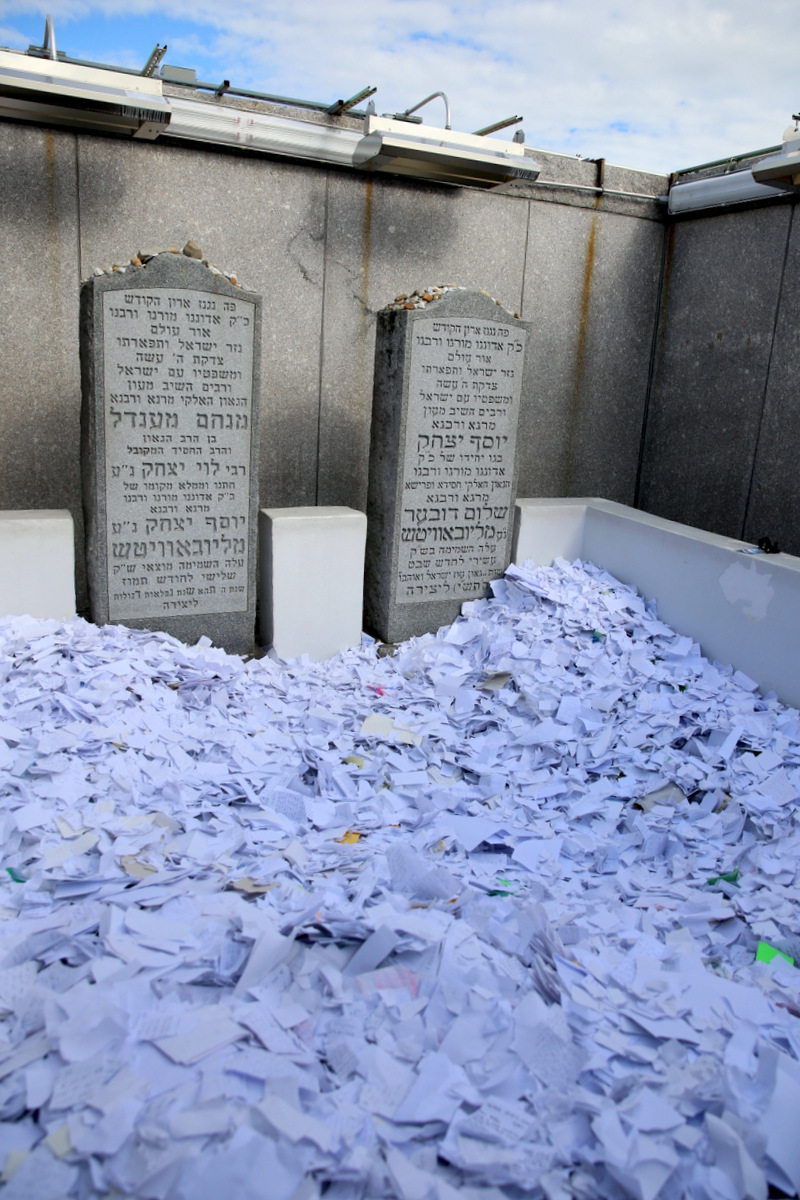
Schneerson's burial place next to his father-in-law and predecessor in Queens, New York

Following age-old Jewish tradition that the grave of a tzadik is holy, Schneerson's gravesite is viewed by many as a sacred site. It has been described by Yedioth Ahronoth as "the American Western Wall", where thousands of Jews go to pray each week. Many more send faxes and e-mails with requests for prayers to be read at the gravesite.

Many famous people have visited the Ohel of the Rebbe, notable among them are Argentina's president Javier Milei, Ben Shapiro, Eric Adams, Robert F. Kennedy, Lamar Odom, Naomi Campbell Kirsten Gillibrand, Jared Kushner, Ivanka Trump and president Donald Trump.

==== Wills ====
Schneerson died without naming a successor as leader of the Chabad-Lubavitch dynasty, causing controversy within Chabad about Schneerson's will. He did, however, write one legal will, which was signed before witnesses, whereby he transferred stewardship of all the major Chabad institutions as well as all his possessions to Agudas Chasidei Chabad.

Another will, no executed copies of which are known to be in existence, named three senior Chabad rabbis as directors of Agudas Chasidei Chabad.

==== Messianism ====
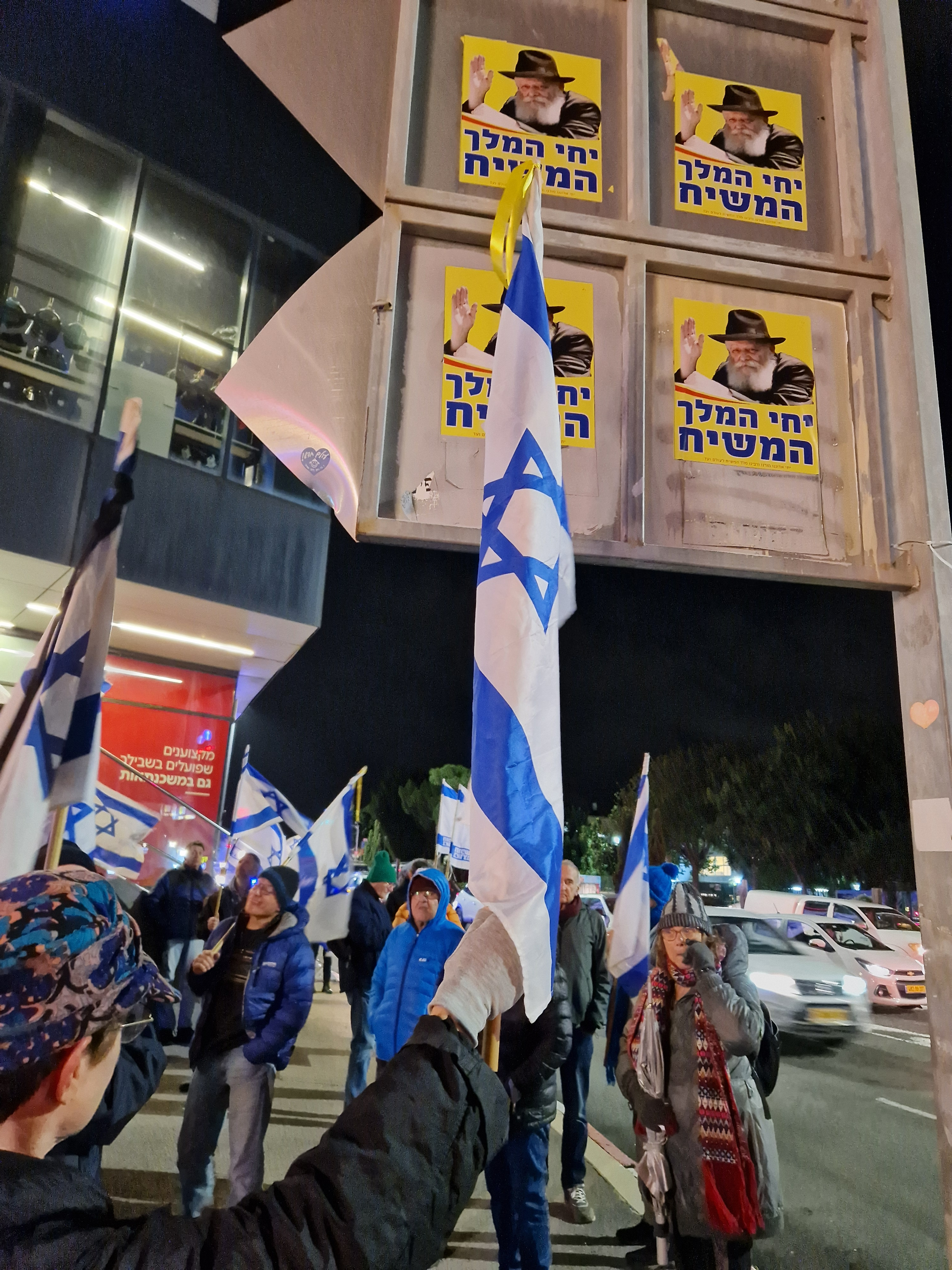
Posters calling Schneerson the Messiah in Haifa, 2024

Schneerson was passionate about raising awareness of the coming of the Messiah. Many of his admirers hoped he would be revealed as the Messiah during his life and many still believe he is alive. They pointed to traditional Jewish theology, which teaches that in every generation there is one person who is worthy of being the Messiah, and if God deems the time right, he will be revealed. Schneerson's supporters have claimed that many Jews felt that if there was indeed a person worthy of such stature, it was Schneerson.

Although Schneerson never explicitly said that he was the Messiah, he did hint to it in his talks, and throughout the years 1993-1994 he encouraged the singing of Yechi (which ascribes the status of Messiah to Schneerson) at almost every opportunity in which he appeared before the public, and according to Schneerson's longtime secretary, Rabbi Yehuda Leib Groner, Schneerson approved of the use of the title "Melech Hamoshiach" ("King Messiah") in connection with his name, this notion of Schneerson being Messiah, however, sparked controversy, particularly among those unfamiliar with these traditional teachings. Detractors criticized a children's song with the words "We want moshiach (the messiah) now / We don't want to wait", that Schneerson commended.

== Global positions ==
=== United States ===
Schneerson spoke of the position of the United States as a world superpower, and would praise what he considered its foundational values of '"E pluribus unum'—from many one", and "In God We Trust". He called on the government to develop independent energy, and not need to rely on totalitarian regimes whose country's national interests greatly differed from the U.S. Schneerson also called for the U.S. government to use its influence on countries who were receiving its foreign aid to do more for the educational and cultural needs of their deprived citizens.

Schneerson placed a strong emphasis on education and often spoke of the need of a moral educational system for all people. He was an advocate of a Department of Education as a separate cabinet position from the Department of Health, Education and Welfare. Schneerson proclaimed 1977 as a "Year of Education" and urged Congress to do the same. He stated that education "must think in terms of a 'better living' not only for the individual, but also for the society as a whole. The educational system must, therefore, pay more attention to the building of character, with emphasis on moral and ethical values. Education must put greater emphasis on the promotion of fundamental human rights and obligations of justice and morality, which are the basis of any human society".

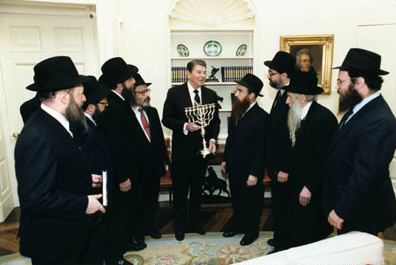
President Ronald Reagan receives menorah from the "American Friends of Lubavitch", White House, 1984

The Ninety-Fifth Congress of the United States issued a Joint Resolution proclaiming 1978 as a Year of Education and designating April 18, 1978, as "Education Day, U.S.A.". Each year since, the President of the United States has proclaimed Schneerson's birthday as "Education Day, U.S.A." in his honor.

During his life, Schneerson had great influence on numerous political leaders from across the aisle, many of whom would seek his advice. He was visited by presidents, prime ministers, governors, senators, congressmen and mayors. Notable among them are John F. Kennedy, Robert Kennedy, Franklin D. Roosevelt Jr., Ronald Reagan, Jimmy Carter, Jacob Javits, Ed Koch, Rudy Giuliani, David Dinkins and Joe Lieberman.

According to Howard Mortman's book, When Rabbis Bless Congress, Schneerson was the rabbi most mentioned in Congress.

=== Israel ===
Schneerson took great interest in the affairs of the state of Israel, and did whatever was in his power to support the infrastructure of the state and advance its success. He was concerned with the nation's agricultural, industrial and overall economic welfare, and sought to promote its scientific achievements, and enhance its standing in the international community. Schneerson consistently recognized the role of the Israel Defense Forces (IDF) and stated that those who serve in the Israeli army perform a great mitzvah, because they risk their lives to protect the physical safety and welfare of millions of Jews in Israel.

In 1950, Schneerson encouraged the establishment of Israel's first automobile company, Autocars Co. of Haifa. By 1956, the company was responsible for 28% of Israel's exports. Schneerson established a network of trade schools in Israel to train Israeli youth, new immigrants and Holocaust survivors. In 1954, Schneerson established a school for carpentry and woodwork. In 1955, he established an agriculture school. In 1956, he established a school for printing and publishing and, in 1957, a school for textiles.

Although he never visited Israel, many of Israel's top leadership made it a point to visit him. Israeli President Zalman Shazar would visit Schneerson whenever he came to New York and corresponded extensively with him, as would Prime Minister Menachem Begin who visited Schneerson numerous times, including a famous visit before going to Washington to meet President Carter. Ariel Sharon, who had a close relationship with Schneerson, often quoted his views on military matters and sought his advice when considering retirement from the military. Schneerson advised the general to remain at his post. Yitzhak Rabin, Shimon Peres and Benjamin Netanyahu also visited and sought Schneerson's advice. Israeli politicians and military experts who came to consult with him were surprised by his detailed knowledge of their country's local affairs and international situation. Despite his advisory meetings with American and Israeli political notables, Schneerson stated his nonpartisan policy many times, warning of his non-involvement in politics.

Schneerson publicly expressed his view that the safety and stability of Israel were in the best interests of the United States, calling Israel the front line against those who want the anti-Western nations to succeed. He was opposed to land for peace, which he called an "illusion of peace," saying that it would not save lives, but harm lives. Schneerson stated that this position was not based on nationalist or other religious reasons, but solely on concern for human life. Benjamin Netanyahu said that, while he was serving as the Permanent Representative of Israel to the United Nations in 1984, Schneerson told him: "You will be serving in a house of darkness, but remember that even in the darkest place, the light of a single candle can be seen far and wide." Netanyahu retold this episode in a speech at the United Nations General Assembly on September 23, 2011.

Just before the outbreak of the Six-Day War, Schneerson called for a global Tefillin campaign to see that Jews observe the mitzvah of wearing Tefillin as a means of ensuring divine protection against Israel's enemies. Speaking to a crowd of thousands of people on May 28, 1967, only a few days before the outbreak of the war, he assured the world that Israel would be victorious. He said Israel did not need to fear because God was with them, quoting the verse, "the Guardian of Israel neither slumbers nor sleeps". Within the Haredi community, criticism of the campaign was voiced at the Agudat Yisrael convention of 1968. However, following the incident, Yitzchok Hutner, a prominent Orthodox rabbi who had corresponded with Schneersohn in the past, wrote to Schneerson privately, distancing himself from the convention. Hutner wrote that he had not been at the convention and asked forgiveness for any pain his earlier letters (discussing halachic issues regarding the tefillin campaign) may have caused.

After the Entebbe raid, in a public talk on August 16, 1976, Schneerson applauded the courage and selflessness of the Israel Defense Forces, "who flew thousands of miles, putting their lives in danger for the sole purpose of possibly saving the lives of tens of Jews." He said: "their portion in the Hereafter is guaranteed." Haredi rabbis later vilified him for publicly praising the courage of the IDF and suggesting that God chose them as a medium through which he would send deliverance to the Jewish people. Schneerson protested vehemently against those elements within the ultra-Haredi society who sought to undermine the soldiers' motivations and actions.

Schneerson opposed Israel returning any territory captured in the Six-Day War, arguing that territorial concessions would endanger Jewish lives by making Israel more vulnerable to attack, and were therefore prohibited under Jewish law on the basis of pikuach nefesh (preservation of life).

=== Soviet Jewry ===
Schneerson greatly encouraged the Jews who lived in Communist states. He sent many emissaries on covert missions to sustain Judaism under Communist regimes and to provide them with their religious and material needs. Many Jews from behind the Iron Curtain corresponded with Schneerson, sending their letters to him via secret messenger and addressing Schneerson in code name as 'Grandfather'.

Schneerson opposed demonstrations on behalf of Soviet Jews, stating that he had evidence that they were harming Russia's Jews. Instead, he advocated quiet diplomacy, which he said would be more effective. Schneerson did whatever was in his power to push for the release of Jews from the former Soviet Union and established schools, communities and other humanitarian resources to assist with their absorption into Israel. On one known occasion he instructed Senator Chic Hecht to provide President Ronald Reagan with contact information of people who wished to leave so that he could lobby their release.

Following the Chernobyl disaster in 1986, Schneerson called for efforts to rescue Ukrainian Jewish children from Chernobyl and founded a special organization for this purpose. The first rescue flight occurred on August 3, 1990, when 196 Jewish children were flown to Israel and brought to a shelter campus. Since then, thousands of children have been rescued and brought to Israel, where they receive housing, education, and medical care in a supportive environment.

Natan Sharansky, the Chairman of the Jewish Agency, said that Chabad Lubavitch was an essential connector to Soviet Jewry during the Cold War, while Shimon Peres has stated that it's to Schneerson's credit that "Judaism in the Soviet Union has been preserved".

== Legacy ==
=== Impact ===
Schneerson initiated Jewish outreach in the post-Holocaust era. He believed that world Jewry was seeking to deepen its understanding of its heritage and to bring Judaism to Jews wherever they were. Jonathan Sacks, Chief Rabbi of the United Hebrew Congregations of the Commonwealth, said of Schneerson, "that if the Nazis searched out every Jew in hate, the Rebbe wished to search out every Jew in love". He oversaw the building of schools, community centers, and youth camps. He created a global network of emissaries known as Shluchim.

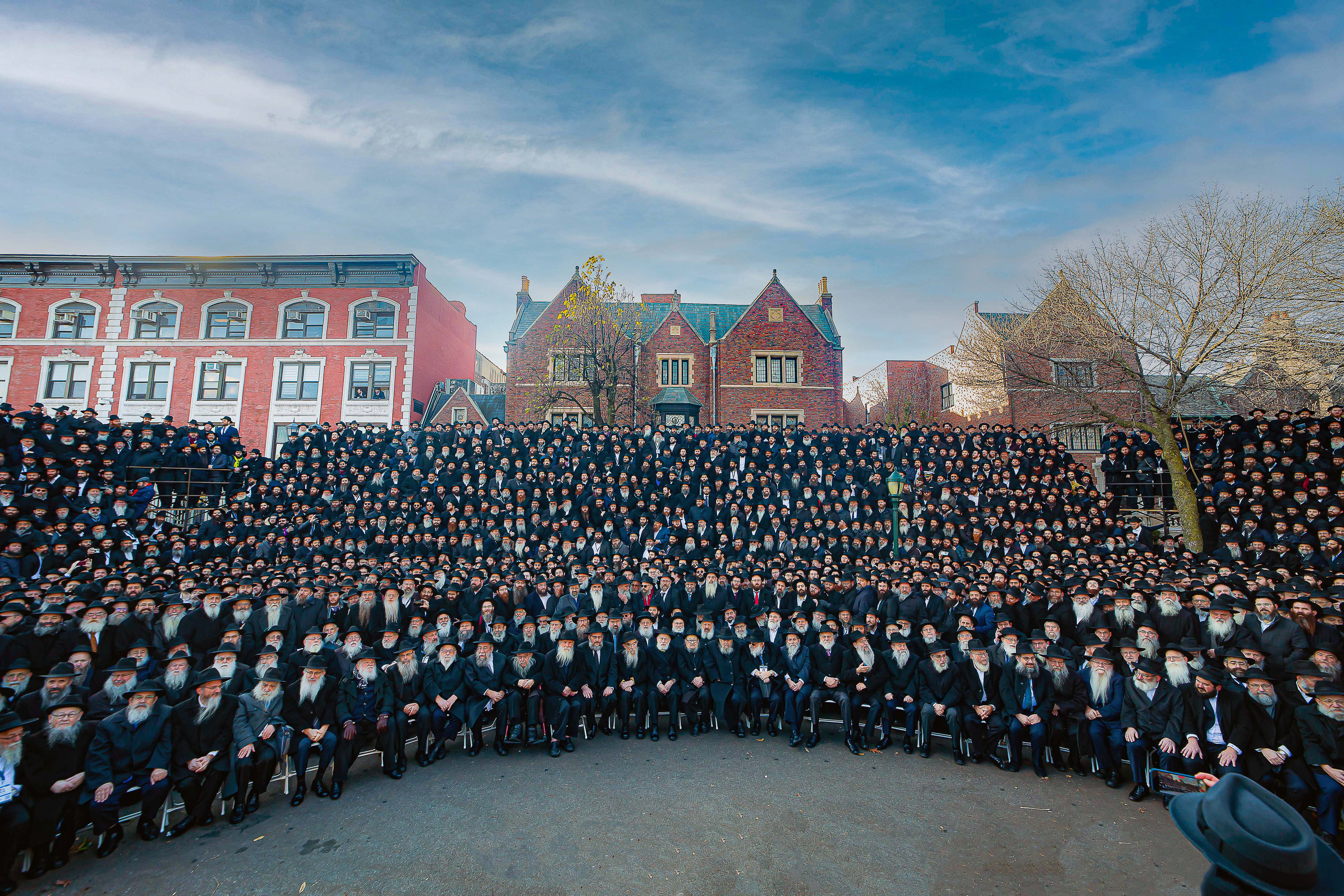
Thousands of Shluchim gathered in front of 770 Eastern Parkway in November 2022

Today, there are shluchim in all US states and in over 100 countries and 1000 cities worldwide, totalling more than 3,600 institutions, including over 500 in Israel. Chabad is very often the only Jewish presence in a given town or city and it has become the face of Jewish Orthodoxy for the Jewish and general world.

Schneerson's model of Jewish outreach has been imitated by all Jewish movements, including the Reform, Conservative, Orthodox and Haredi. His published works fill more than 250 volumes and are often used as source text for sermons of both Chabad and non-Chabad rabbis. Beyond the Jewish world, Peggy Noonan has written that moral issues would be better addressed by leaders such as Schneerson than by politicians, and since his death, Schneerson has been referred to as the Rebbe for all people.

=== Recognition ===
Schneerson's work was recognized by every US president from Richard Nixon to Donald Trump. In 1978, Schneerson became the first rabbi to have a U.S. national day proclaimed in his honor, when the U.S. Congress and President Jimmy Carter designated Schneerson's birthdate as "Education Day USA". Each year since, the President has called on all Americans to focus on education in honor of Schneerson. In 1982, Ronald Reagan proclaimed Schneerson's birthday as a "National Day of Reflection" and presented the "National Scroll of Honor" that was signed by the President, Vice-President and every member of Congress.

Many officials attended Schneerson's funeral, including New York Mayor Rudy Giuliani, Benjamin Netanyahu, and the entire staff of the Embassy of Israel, Washington, D.C..

President Bill Clinton penned a condolence letter "to the Chabad-Lubavitch community and to world Jewry" and spoke of Schneerson as "a monumental man who as much as any other individual, was responsible over the last half a century for advancing the instruction of ethics and morality to our young people". Israeli Prime Minister Yitzchak Rabin cited Schneerson's great scholarship and contribution to the entire Jewish people. He proclaimed, "The Rebbe's loss is a loss for all the Jewish people." Foreign Minister Shimon Peres cited words from the prophet Malachi as applying with particular force to Schneerson: "He brought back many from iniquity. For a priest's lips shall guard knowledge, and teaching should be sought from his mouth. For he is a messenger of the Lord."

Shortly after his death, Schneerson was posthumously awarded the Congressional Gold Medal, honoring Schneerson for his "outstanding and enduring contributions toward world education, morality, and acts of charity". President Bill Clinton spoke these words at the Congressional Gold Medal ceremony:

The late Rebbe's eminence as a moral leader for our country was recognized by every president since Richard Nixon. For over two decades, the Rabbi's movement now has some 2000 institutions; educational, social, medical, all across the globe. We (the United States Government) recognize the profound role that Rabbi Schneerson had in the expansion of those institutions.

In 2009, the Weitzman National Museum of American Jewish History selected Schneerson as one of eighteen American Jews to be included in their "Only in America" Hall of Fame.

Schneerson's contribution with respect to comprehension of human emotion is considered by many to be unparalleled; as Elie Wiesel said, "When the Rebbe was alone with anyone, it was an opening. He opened doors for his visitor, or his student or Chasid—secret doors that we all have. It wasn’t a break-in. It was just an invitation. And that was really the greatness of the Rebbe. I think the Rebbe had a great talent for that—one of the greatest and the best that Judaism has ever seen." Schneerson is often considered to be one of the most, if not the most, influential rabbis of the twentieth century.

=== Apotheosis ===
While considered the messiah by many of his followers following his death in 1994, one small group deified him. In the book The Rebbe, the Messiah, and the Scandal of Orthodox Indifference, it is mentioned that the small fringe group consider him the creator of the universe.

== Criticism ==
From the 1970s onwards, Elazar Shach of the Ponevezh Yeshiva in Bnei Brak was publicly critical of Schneerson, accusing him of creating a cult of crypto-messianism around himself. Shach objected to Schneerson's calling upon the Messiah to appear and eventually called for a boycott of Chabad and its institutions. Though Schneerson never responded publicly to Shach's attacks (at times he referred to Shach as "the man from bnei brak"), he did rebuke those who disparaged (religious and non-religious) Jews and for bringing division among them in apparent response to Shach, explaining that "every Jew, regardless of differences and levels of observances, is part of Am Echad", the unified Jewish people.

== Scholarship and works ==
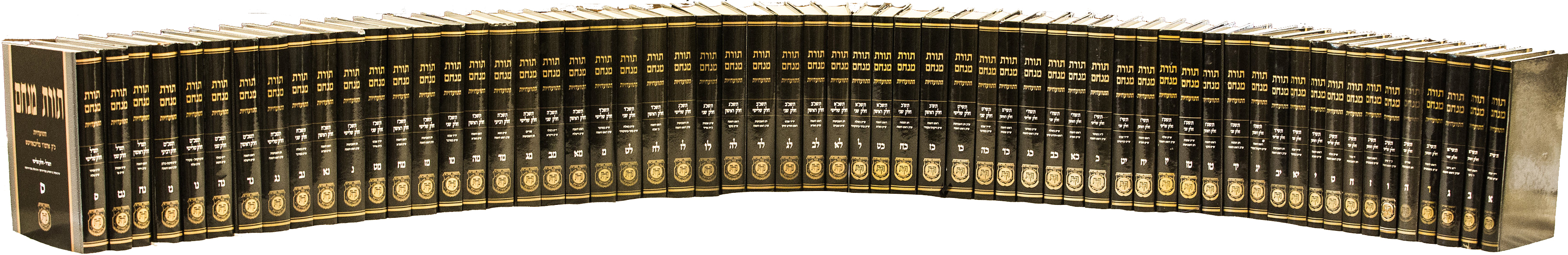
Set of Torat Menachem

Schneerson is recognized for his scholarship and contributions to Talmudic, Halachic, Kabalistic and Chasidic teachings. Joseph B. Soloveitchik, who knew Schneerson from their days in Berlin, and remained in contact once the two men came to America, told his students after visiting Schneerson "the Rebbe has a gevaldiker [tremendous] comprehension of the Torah", and "He is a gaon, he is a great one, he is a leader of Israel."

According to Mordechai Eliyahu, former Chief Rabbi of Israel, his meeting with Schneerson "covered all sections of the Torah". Eliyahu said, "The Rebbe jumped effortlessly from one Talmudic tractate to another, and from there to Kabbalah and then to Jewish law ... It was as if he had just finished studying these very topics from the holy books. The whole Torah was an open book in front of him".

Schneerson's teachings have been published in more than two hundred fifty volumes. Schneerson also penned tens of thousands of letters in reply to requests for blessings and advice. These detailed and personal letters offer advice and explanation on a wide variety of subjects, including spiritual matters as well as all aspects of life.

=== Books in Hebrew and Yiddish ===
- 1943: Hayom Yom – An anthology of Chabad aphorisms and customs arranged according to the days of the year
- 1944: Sefer HaToldot – Admor Moharash – Biography of the fourth Lubavitcher Rebbe, Shmuel Schneersohn
- 1946: Haggadah Im Likkutei Ta'amim U'minhagim – The Haggadah with a commentary written by Schneerson
- 1951–1992: Sefer HaMa'amarim Melukot – edited chassidic discourses (6 volumes, 4 volumes in the new print)
- 1951–2025: Sefer HaMa'amarim Hasidic discourses including 1951–1980 with plans to complete the rest (29 volumes)
- 1962–2021: Likkutei Sichot – Schneerson's edited talks on the weekly Torah portions, Jewish Holidays, and other topics (40 volumes)
- 1981–1992: Torat Menachem Hitvaduyot – transcripts of talks in Hebrew, 1982–1992 (63 volumes)
- 1985: Chidushim UBiurim B'Shas – novellae on the Talmud (3 volumes)
- 1985–1987: Sichot Kodesh – transcripts of talks in Yiddish from 1950 to 1981 (50 volumes)
- 1985–2026: Igrot Kodesh – Schneerson's Hebrew and Yiddish letters (42 volumes)
- 1987–1992: Sefer HaSichot – Schneerson's edited talks from 1987 to 1992. (12 volumes)
- 1988: Hilchot Beit Habechira LeHaRambam Im Chiddushim U'Beurim – Talks and novel insights on the Laws of the Holy Temple of the Mishneh Torah
- 1989: Biurim LePirkei Avot – talks on the Mishnaic tractate of "Ethics of the Fathers" (2 volumes)
- 1990–2010: Heichal Menachem – Shaarei – talks arranged by topic and holiday (34 volumes)
- 1991: Biurim LePeirush Rashi – talks on the commentary of Rashi to Torah (5 volume)
- 1991: Yein Malchut – talks on the Mishneh Torah (2 volumes).
- 1992: Torat Menachem – Tiferet Levi Yitzchok – talks on the works of his father, Levi Yitzchak Schneerson on the Zohar (3 volumes)
- 1993–2025: Torat Menachem transcripts of talks in Hebrew, 1950–1976. (Planned to encompass 1950–1992, with a projected final count of around 160 to 180 volumes) (83 volumes)
- 1994–2001: Reshimot – Schneerson's personal journal discovered after his death. Includes notes for his public talks before 1950, letters to Jewish scholars, notes on the Tanya, and thoughts on a wide range of Jewish subjects penned between 1928 and 1950 (10 volumes)

=== Books in English (original and translated) ===
- The Teachings of The Rebbe – The Chassidic Discourses of The Rebbe in English
- Letters from the Rebbe – eight volume set of Schneerson's English letters
- Path to Selflessness – work discussing the bond between the individual soul and God
- Garments of the Soul – discussing the sublime importance of mundane activities, and their effect on the soul
- The Letter and the Spirit – six volumes so far published of the Rebbe's English letters
- Sichos in English – fifty-one volumes published of the Rebbe's talks in English

== Sources ==
- Ehrlich, Avrum M. The Messiah of Brooklyn: understanding Lubavitch Hasidism past and present. Jersey City: KTAV Publishing, 2004. ISBN 0-88125-836-9.
- Fishkoff, Sue. The Rebbe's Army: Inside the World of Chabad-Lubavitch. Schocken, 2005. ISBN 978-0805211382
- Heilman, Samuel C.; Friedman, Menachem M. The Rebbe. The Life and Afterlife of Menachem Mendel Schneerson. Princeton and Oxford: Princeton University Press, 2010. ISBN 978-0-691-13888-6
- Hoffman, Edward. Despite all odds: the story of Lubavitch. New York: Simon & Schuster, 1991. ISBN 0-671-67703-9
- Rapoport, Chaim. The Afterlife of Scholarship. Oporto Press, 2011. ISBN 0615538975
- Steinsaltz, Adin. My Rebbe. Maggid Books, 2014. ISBN 978-159-264-381-3
- Telushkin, Joseph. Rebbe: The Life and Teachings of Menachem M. Schneerson, the Most Influential Rabbi in Modern History. HarperWave, 2014. ISBN 978-0062318985

Preceded by Yosef Yitzchak Schneersohn	Rebbe of Lubavitch; 1951–1994	Succeeded by N/A
