= Chabad affiliated organizations =

Organizations affiliated with the Chabad movement within Hasidic Judaism

Chabad affiliated organizations and institutions number in the thousands. Chabad is a Hasidic movement, a branch of Orthodox Judaism. The organizations and institutions associated with the movement provide social, educational and religious services to Jews worldwide. Local Chabad centers and institutions are often incorporated as separate legal entities.

== Chabad organizational structure ==
Chabad organizations encompass a range of different entities, including individual organizations, central and umbrella organizations, and independent organizations in the US, Israel, and around the world. Many of the central organizations in the US have parallel sister organizations in Israel, headquartered in Kfar Chabad Israel.

Chabad's central organization, representing the movement at large, Agudas Chasidei Chabad, is headed by Rabbi Avraham Shemtov. The educational and outreach arm, Merkos L'Inyonei Chinuch, is headed by Rabbi Yehuda Krinsky. Other central organizations include and Mahane Israel.

=== Agudas Chasidei Chabad ===
Agudas Chassidei Chabad (English: Association of Chabad Chassidim), also known by its initials "Aguch" is the primary umbrella organization for the worldwide Chabad-Lubavitch movement. It was founded in 1923 sixth Lubavitcher Rebbe, Rabbi Yosef Yitzchok Schneersohn. Aguch oversees the other Chabad central organizations, such as and Merkos L'Inyonei Chinuch. The chairman of the executive committee is Rabbi Abraham Shemtov.

The organization's divisions are:

- Library of Agudas Chassidei Chabad – Chabad's main library, housing its book and manuscript collection and historical archives.
- Lubavitch Youth Organization –
- Machne Israel – Founded in 1942, Mahane Israel acts as Chabad's social service agency, with several divisions:
  - Tzivos Hashem – Tzivot Hashem provides educational activities for Jewish children under Bar/Bat Mitzvah.
    - Panasaim
    - The Great Parade
  - N'shei Chabad – The movement's central women's organization.
  - Colel Chabad – Originally established by Rabbi Shneur Zalman of Liadi, Collel Chabad is one of the oldest Jewish charities currently operating.
  - Taharas Hamishpocho International – Founded in 1975, the organization provides educational resources related to Jewish family purity.

=== Merkos L'Inyonei Chinuch ===
Merkos L'Inyonei Chinuch – Founded in 1942 by the sixth Rebbe, Rabbi Yosef Yitzchok Schneersohn, Merkos, as it is commonly known, is Chabad's primary educational arm and institution, with several divisions:

- Kehot Publication Society – Chabad's main publishing house.
- Central Chabad Lubavitch Library – The movement's main library, which houses its manuscript collection and other Jewish works.
- Chabad.org – Chabad's main website; it includes thousands of articles and Jewish multimedia.
- Office of Education (Chabad) – A center for educators and parents.
- National Committee for the Furtherance of Jewish Education (NCFJE) – The NCFJE operates several summer camps and other Jewish educational programs, including released time.
- Jewish Learning Institute (JLI) – JLI provides Jewish education classes for adults and teens.
- Jewish Learning Network ("jnet") – "jnet" provides a service matching Jewish adults who wish to study Jewish topics with volunteers who offer tutoring over the phone.
- The Shluchim Office – A resource center for Shluchim, Chabad's emissaries.
- Jewish Educational Media (JEM) – JEM houses the movement's audio and video collection.
- The Shluchim Exchange – An online social network for Shluchim, Chabad's emissaries.

=== Affiliated organizations ===
Other organizations affiliated with the movement include:

- Tomchei Temimim – The central organization administering Chabad yeshivas. Founded in 1897, Tomchei Temimim is older than Agudas Chasidei Chabad, but it is nevertheless overseen by it, as are all central chabad institutions.
- Vaad Talmidei Hatmimim Haolami – The central student organization serving the worldwide Chabad Lubavitch Yeshiva network. Founded in 2001, the Vaad is under the auspices of the Yeshiva faculty.
- Federation of Jewish Communities of Russia and Federation of Jewish Communities of the CIS – The central organizations representing Russian Jewry. These organizations are run by Chabad emissaries and their supporters; however, they are not overseen by Agudas Chasidei Chabad.
- Menachem Education Foundation (MEF)
- Friendship Circle - charity for children and young people with special needs
- Chabad Teen Network, or CTeen, is a global family of Jewish teens dedicated to changing the world through acts of goodness and kindness. Through a fusion of fun, friendship building events, humanitarian outreach, mitzvah observance, and engaging Torah study, teens are empowered to actualize their inner potential, while cultivating a strong sense of Jewish identity, pride, mission, and love of G‑d.

== Chabad institutions ==
As of 2025, there are over 6,000 Chabad institutions worldwide. As of 2023, there were 5000 Chabad centers in 100 countries.

This number of Chabad institutions includes schools and other Chabad-affiliated establishments. The number of Chabad centers varies by country; the majority are located in the United States and Israel (see table). There are over 40 countries which have a small Chabad presence (not listed in the table). In total, according to its directory, Chabad maintains a presence in 950 cities around the world: 178 in Europe, 14 in Africa, 200 in Israel, 400 in North America, 38 in South America, and about 70 in Asia (excluding Israel, and Russia).

== Chabad institutions by geographic region ==
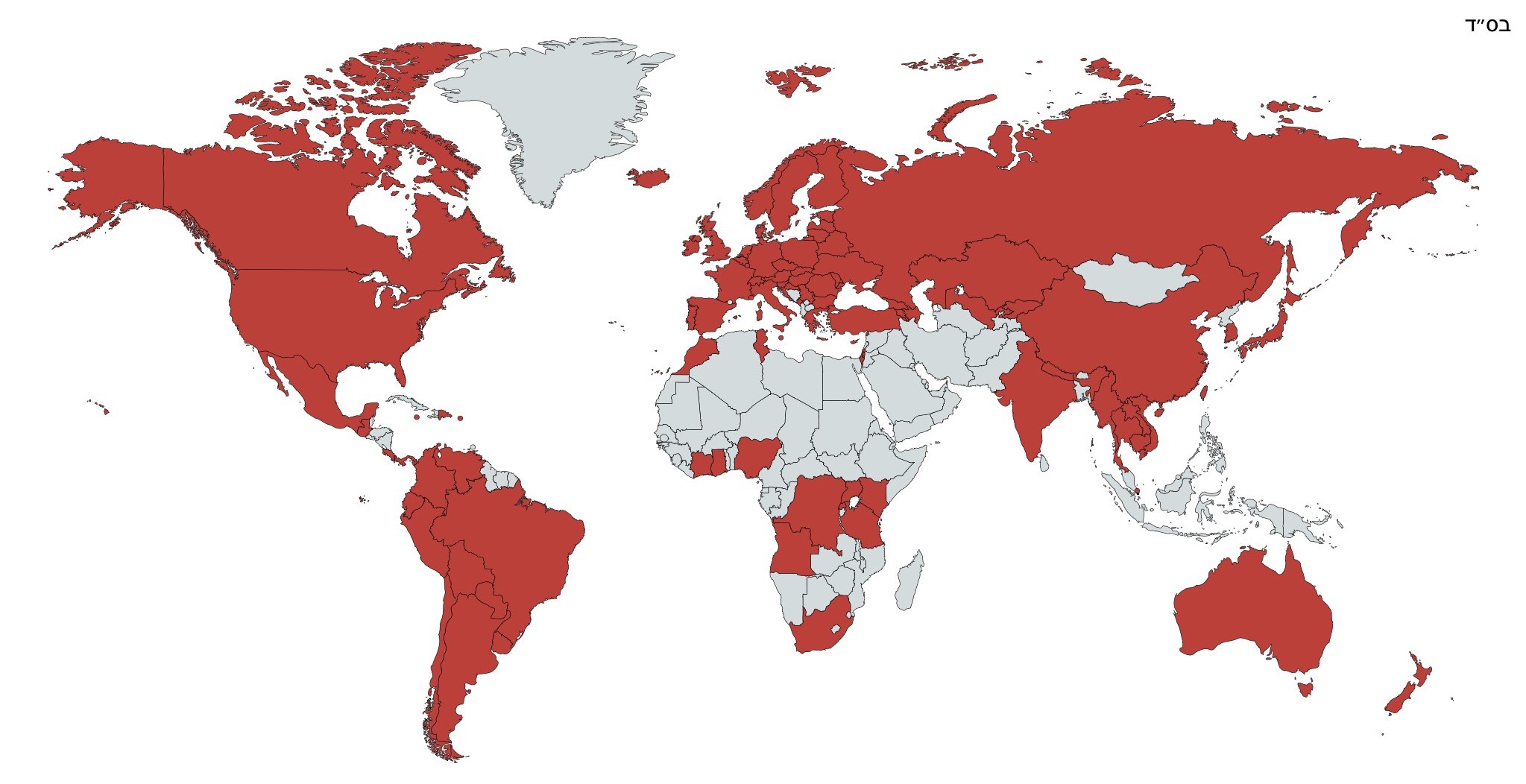
Map of Countries with Chabad-Lubavitch as of 2020.

Chabad institutions are spread throughout the globe, with the largest concentration being in the United States.

=== Chabad institutions in Europe ===
There are 465 Chabad institutions in Europe. The majority are in France, Russia, Ukraine and the United Kingdom.

Country	Chabad institutions
Armenia	3
Austria	14
Azerbaijan	3
Belarus	8
Belgium	7
Bulgaria	3
Croatia	1
Czech Republic	3
Denmark	1
Estonia	1
France	125
Finland	1
Georgia	1
Germany	14
Greece	3
Hungary	3
Ireland	1
Italy	19
Latvia	1
Lithuania	2
Luxembourg	1
Malta	1
Moldova	1
Netherlands	14
Norway	1
Poland	2
Romania	1
Russia	91
Serbia	1
Slovakia	2
Spain	4
Sweden	3
Switzerland	9
Ukraine	62
United Kingdom	51
Total	457

=== Chabad institutions in Asia ===
There are 616 Chabad institutions in Asia. The majority are in Israel.

Country	Chabad institutions
Cambodia	1
China	8
Cyprus	5
India	3
Israel	573
Japan	2
Kazakhstan	5
Korea	1
Kyrgyzstan	1
Laos	1
Nepal	1
North Cyprus	1
Singapore	1
Taiwan	1
Thailand	8
Turkey	2
Uzbekistan	5
Total	619

=== Chabad institutions in Oceania ===
There are 67 Chabad institutions in Oceania. The majority are in Australia.

Country	Chabad institutions
Australia	65
New Zealand	2
Total	67

=== Chabad institutions in Africa ===
There are 27 Chabad institutions in Africa. The majority are in South Africa.

Country	Chabad institutions
Democratic Republic of Congo	1
Angola	1
Ghana	1
Morocco	3
Nigeria	2
South Africa	19
Tunisia	1
Zambia	1
Total	27

=== Chabad institutions in North America ===
There are 1,174 Chabad institutions in North America. The majority are in Canada and the United States.

Country	Chabad institutions
Canada	110
Costa Rica	2
Dominican Republic	2
Guatemala	4
Cayman Islands	1
United States	1,060
Total	1,174

=== Chabad institutions in South America ===
There are 81 Chabad institutions in South America. The majority are in Brazil and Argentina.

Country	Chabad institutions
Argentina	35
Bolivia	1
Brazil	35
Chile	2
Colombia	2
Ecuador	1
Paraguay	1
Peru	2
Uruguay	1
Venezuela	1
Total	81

== Chabad houses ==
A Chabad house is a form of Jewish community center, primarily serving both educational and observance purposes. Often, until the community can support its own center, the Chabad house is located in the shaliach's home, with the living room being used as the "synagogue." Effort is made to provide an atmosphere in which the nonobservant will not feel intimidated by any perceived contrast between their lack of knowledge of Jewish practice and the advanced knowledge of some of the people they meet there. The term "Chabad house" originated with the creation of the first such outreach center on the campus of UCLA by Rabbi Shlomo Cunin.

In the 2008 Mumbai attacks, the local Chabad house was targeted. The local Chabad emissaries, Rabbi Gavriel Holtzberg and his wife Rivka, and four other Jews were brutally murdered. Chabad received condolences from around the world.
