= Moshe Kotlarsky =

American rabbi (1949–2024)

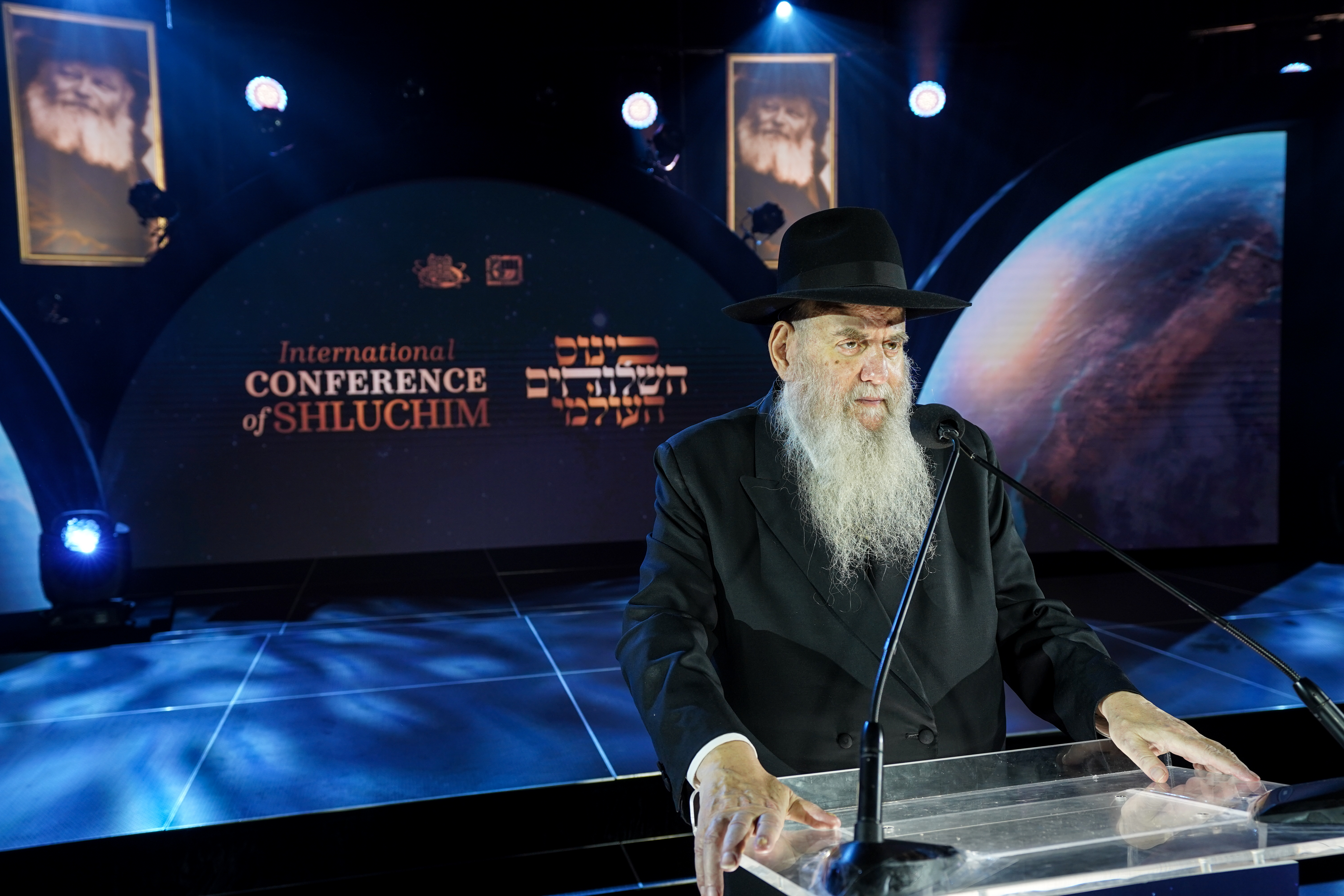
- Kotlarsky addresses the Kinus Hashluchim in 2020.
- Born: June 8, 1949; New York City, New York
- Died: June 4, 2024 (aged 74); New York City
- Occupation: Vice Chairman of Merkos L'Inyonei Chinuch

Moshe Yehuda Kotlarsky (June 8, 1949 – June 4, 2024) was an American Orthodox Hasidic rabbi who served as Vice Chairman of Merkos L'Inyonei Chinuch, the educational arm of the Chabad-Lubavitch movement which in turn oversees over 5,000 religious and educational institutions worldwide. Kotlarsky was a movement fundraiser and participant in the outreach operation. He also headed the Chabad on Campus International Foundation which is active on over two hundred and thirty campuses worldwide, and served as chairman of the Rohr Jewish Learning Institute.

== Early life ==
Kotlarsky was born and raised in the Crown Heights section of Brooklyn, New York, on June 8, 1949. His father, Rabbi Tzvi Yosef (Hershel) Kotlarsky (d. 2008), was a native of Otwosk, Poland who spent the World War II years in Shanghai. The elder Rabbi Kotlarsky was a member of the administration of Yeshivas Tomchei Temimim, the main Lubavitch yeshiva in Crown Heights, Brooklyn, for over 40 years.

== Activities ==
=== Global ambassador ===
Shortly after his marriage, Kotlarsky began working for Merkos, the Chabad division responsible for outreach, on the cusp of an explosion in the number of volunteer Chabad emissaries around the world. He traveled to outlying Jewish communities in 1968, identifying their needs and working with local community leaders to plan future Chabad centers. He became a crucial resource connecting field operatives with Chabad headquarters.

He oversaw about four thousand institutions in a hundred countries. He presided over the Kinus Hashluchim, the annual international conference of Chabad emissaries that takes place in New York City. He served as director of the conference, where more than 4,000 emissaries and their families participated in workshops, social events, a shared Shabbat and a banquet. He also served as one of Chabad's spokespersons, and oversaw religious and educational institutions in over a hundred countries.

Kotlarsky had also been named in various published rankings of Jewish leaders, including the Algemeiner Journals 'Jewish 100' and the Forward 50.

=== Fundraiser ===
Kotlarsky cultivated Chabad's relationship with many philanthropists worldwide, including the Sami Rohr and his son George. His office had administered the 'Bogolubov Simcha Fund' which disbursed grants to Chabad representatives worldwide for family related expenses. He had also facilitated grants for individual emissaries and their community projects through his contacts with philanthropists.

== Personal life ==
Kotlarsky was married to Rivka Kazen, one of six daughters of Rabbi Shlomo Schneur Zalman Kazen.

His brother-in-law was Rabbi Yosef Yitzchak Kazen.

Kotlarsky's son, Rabbi Mendy Kotlarsky, is the director of Merkos 302 and president of Chabad's international Cteen program.

Kotlarsky died in New York City on June 4, 2024, at the age of 74, from pancreatic cancer.
