= Mendy Kotlarsky =

American Chabad-Lubavitch rabbi

Rabbi Mendy Kotlarsky
- Title: Executive director of Merkos 302

Personal life
- Born: February 11, 1982 (age 44) Brooklyn, New York, United States
- Parent: Moshe Kotlarsky (father)
- Occupation: Rabbi, Jewish communal leader

Religious life
- Religion: Judaism
- Denomination: Hasidic Judaism
- Movement: Chabad-Lubavitch

Jewish leader
- Organization: Merkos L'Inyonei Chinuch
- Residence: Crown Heights, Brooklyn, New York

Mendy Kotlarsky (born February 11, 1982) is an American Chabad-Lubavitch rabbi and Jewish communal leader. He is the executive director of Merkos 302, a division of Merkos L'Inyonei Chinuch, the educational arm of the Chabad-Lubavitch movement, and is involved in supporting and coordinating the movement's international network of emissaries (shluchim) operating in more than 110 countries. He leads Chabad's international expansion efforts from the movement's headquarters in Brooklyn.

Kotlarsky has overseen the development of Chabad programs including CTeen, CKids, Chabad Young Professionals (CYP), and Chabad on Call. Following the death of his father, Rabbi Moshe Kotlarsky, in 2024, he assumed a leading role as director of the annual International Conference of Shluchim.

== Early life and family ==
Kotlarsky was born on February 11, 1982, into a prominent Chabad-Lubavitch family in Crown Heights, Brooklyn. His father, Moshe Kotlarsky, served as vice chairman of Merkos L'Inyonei Chinuch and played a major role in the international expansion of Chabad's network of emissaries and institutions.

His paternal grandfather, Rabbi Tzvi Yosef "Hershel" Kotlarsky, was a Polish-born Chabad rabbi who spent the Second World War years in Shanghai and later worked at Tomchei Temimim in Crown Heights.

== Chabad activities ==
=== Merkos 302 ===
Kotlarsky established Merkos 302 in 2004 as a division of Merkos L'Inyonei Chinuch designed to provide programs, infrastructure and organizational support to Chabad emissaries and communities worldwide.

Under Kotlarsky, Merkos 302 developed and coordinated programs aimed at different demographic groups within Jewish communities. These included the Chabad Teen Network (CTeen), the Chabad Children's Network (CKids), Chabad Young Professionals (CYP), the Jewish Learning Network (JNet), Chabad on Call, MyShliach and other initiatives.

In 2010, Merkos 302 launched a global youth initiative that subsequently developed into networks serving Jewish children, teenagers and young adults.

Kotlarsky has also participated in regional conferences of Chabad emissaries, including gatherings organized for rabbis serving geographically isolated Jewish communities.

=== CTeen ===
Kotlarsky is chairman of CTeen International, Chabad's youth network. The organization holds an annual conference in New York that includes a gathering in Times Square. Kotlarsky was involved in the development of CTeen, Chabad's international youth organization. The network developed chapters in Jewish communities in North America, Europe, Latin America and other regions.

As part of his work with CTeen, Kotlarsky has participated in the organization's annual international Shabbaton in New York. The event the largest gathering of Jewish teens, brings together thousands of Jewish teenagers from Chabad House communities worldwide and includes an annual gathering in Times Square.

In December 2022, Kotlarsky was involved in organizing a public Hanukkah menorah lighting connected with an NFL Sunday Night Football game at FedExField. The event was described as the first Hanukkah menorah lighting held as part of a Sunday Night Football game.

=== International Conference of Shluchim ===
Kotlarsky has been involved in the organization of the International Conference of Chabad-Lubavitch Emissaries (Kinus Hashluchim), an annual gathering of Chabad emissaries held in New York.

His father, Moshe Kotlarsky, directed the conference for decades and became closely associated with its annual gala banquet. At Moshe Kotlarsky's funeral in June 2024, a letter was read in which he asked his son Mendy to take over his responsibilities. Mendy Kotlarsky subsequently succeeded his father as head of the International Conference of Shluchim.

In this capacity, Kotlarsky has promoted an expansion strategy within the international Chabad network focused on establishing new emissary positions and increasing institutional support for existing Chabad centers.

== Programs and initiatives ==
Kotlarsky's work through Merkos 302 has included programs supporting the establishment of mikvaot in Jewish communities, educational programs for children and teenagers, professional support for Chabad emissaries, and programs serving Jewish patients and their families.

The Global Mikvah Project, established through Merkos 302, provides financial and organizational support to Chabad communities seeking to construct mikvaot.

Kotlarsky has also been associated with Chabad on Call, a network intended to provide support to Jewish patients and families receiving medical treatment away from their home communities.

In the years following the October 7, 2023 attacks in Israel and amid an increase in reported antisemitic incidents in Jewish communities internationally, Kotlarsky participated in efforts to provide additional resources to Chabad emissaries and expand outreach, including on university campuses.

== Leadership ==
In 2026, The Jerusalem Post described Kotlarsky as being at the "operational center" of Chabad's international network, which operates in more than 110 countries. His work has included fundraising for new Chabad emissaries, support for the construction of mikvaot and expansion of Torah study programs.

Kotlarsky has described his approach to Chabad's international expansion as "Judaism on the offense", emphasizing public Jewish identity, education and the establishment of new Jewish institutions.

== Recognition ==
In August 2022, Kotlarsky represented Chabad's Shluchim Network when it received the Katz Prize at a ceremony attended by Israeli president Isaac Herzog.

In 2024, The Algemeiner Journal included Kotlarsky in its J100 list of people it considered influential in Jewish life, citing his work with Merkos 302 and the development of CTeen, CKids and Chabad Young Professionals.

He was included again in The Algemeiner's J100 list in 2025, which cited his role in supporting Chabad communities and expanding outreach following the October 7 attacks and amid increased antisemitism.

In September 2026, The Jerusalem Post included Kotlarsky, together with rabbis Sholom Duchman, Dov Landau, Ephraim Mirvis and Rick Jacobs, at number 28 in its annual list of the 50 most influential Jews.
