= 12–13 Tammuz =

Chabad-Lubavitch holiday

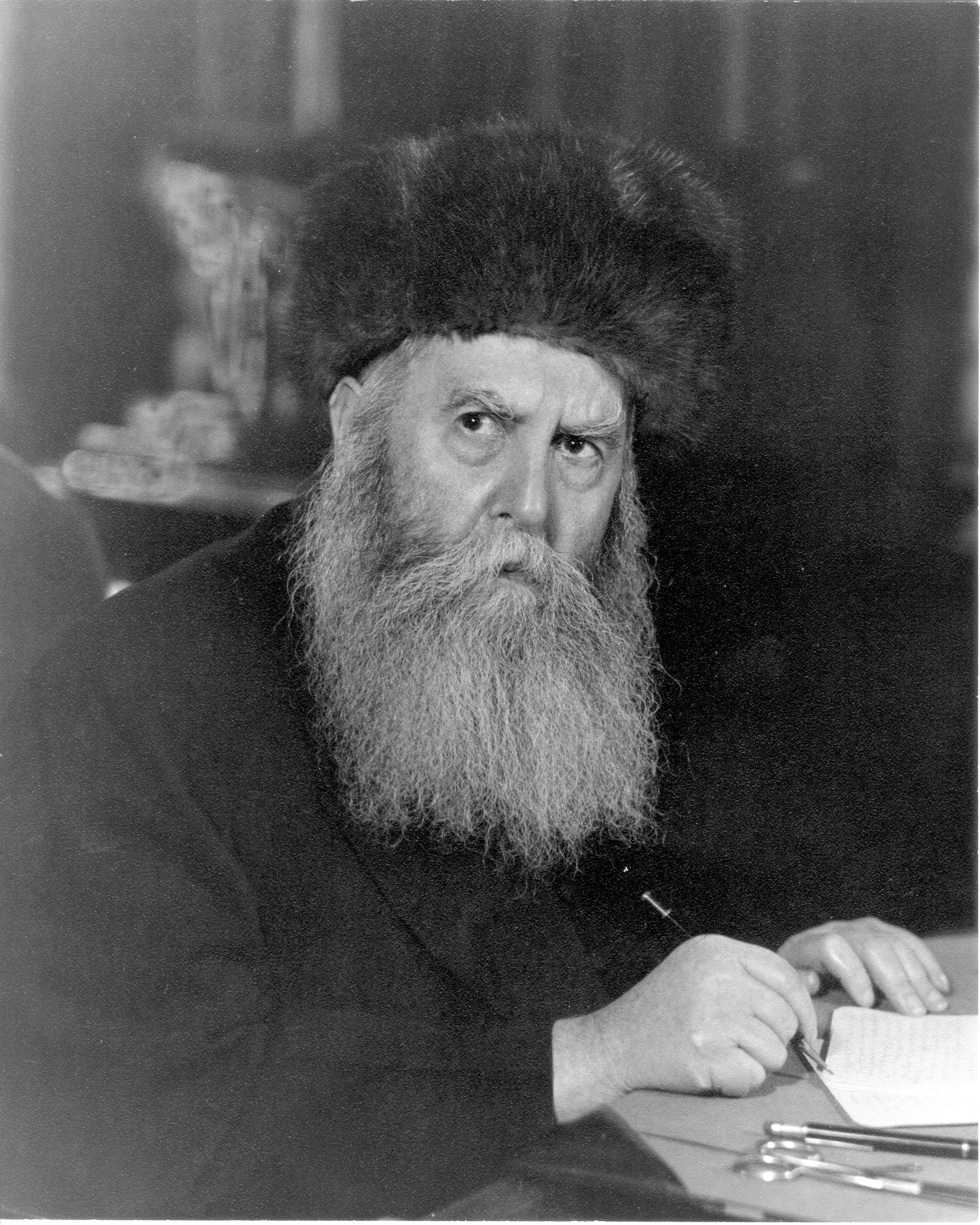
- Rabbi Yosef Yitzchak Schneersohn
- Observed by: Chabad-Lubavich community
- Type: Commemoration
- Significance: Birthday and release day of Rabbi Yosef Yitzchak Schneersohn from Soviet Prison
- Begins: Night of 12 Tammuz
- Ends: Night of 13 Tammuz
- Date: 12–13 Tammuz
- 2025 date: July 18–19
- 2026 date: July 8–9
- 2027 date: June 27–28
- 2028 date: July 17–18
- Duration: 2 days
- Frequency: Annual
- First time: July 3, 1927 (12 Tammuz, 5687)

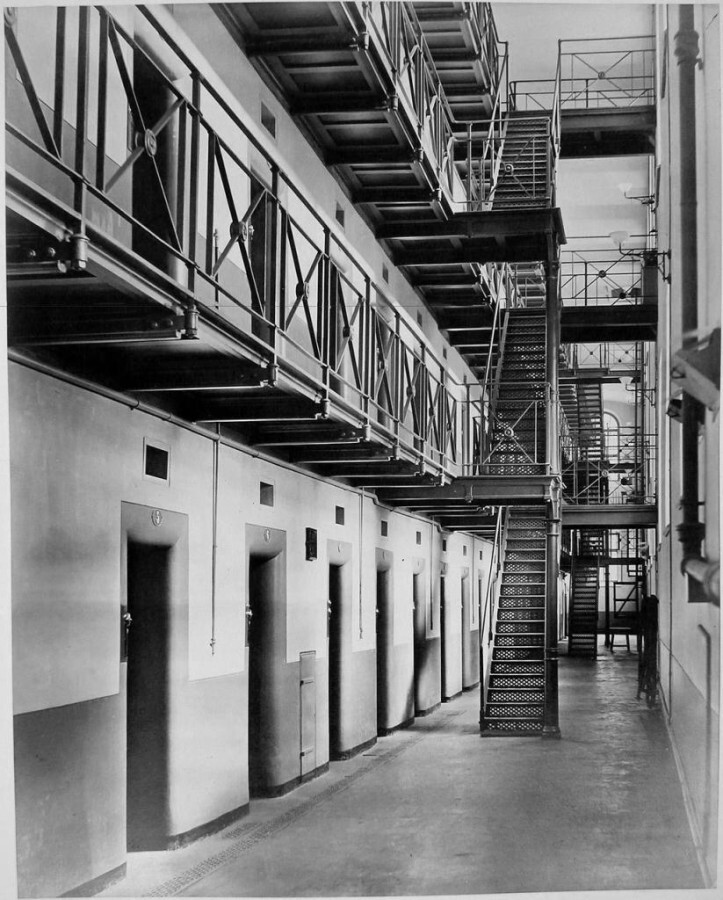
Inside of the Shpalernaya Prison, the prison Rabbi Yosef Yitzchak Schneerson was held in

12–13 Tammuz or Yud beis v' yud gimel Tammuz (Hebrew: י"ב וי"ג תמוז /jud bˈeɪz vi jud ˈɡɪmɛl ˈtɑ muːz/ lit. 'The twelfth and thirteenth of Tammuz') is a holiday on the Chabad-Lubavitch calendar that commemorates the liberation of Rabbi Yosef Yitzchak Schneerson, the sixth Rebbe of the Chabad-Lubavitch dynasty, from Soviet imprisonment. The holiday also marks his birthday. It is one of the three holidays named "day of liberation" by Chabad-Lubavitch

== History ==
Rabbi Yosef Yitzchak Schneerson was arrested on June 15, 1927 (15 Sivan, 5687) in Leningrad, USSR (now St. Petersburg, Russia) by the Soviet secret police also known as the Joint State Political Directorate (OGPU). His arrest occurred during a period of increased repression against religious leaders and institutions, as the Soviet government sought to suppress religious practices and organizations. The Rebbe was charged with conducting Counter-Revolutionary activities, which were seen as counter to the state's efforts to eliminate religion from public life and he was sentenced to death by Soviet authorities.

Rabbi Yosef Yitzchak Schneerson was held in the Shpalernaya Prison (now the Bolshoy Dom) in Leningrad. During his imprisonment, Rabbi Yosef Yitzchak Schneerson experienced severe conditions, including isolation and harsh interrogation. His interrogators attempted to pressure him into confessing to various charges, but he maintained his composure and refused to cooperate. He endured significant physical hardship during this time, including deprivation of food and water, particularly during the first days of his captivity.

Rabbi Yosef Yitzchak Schneerson's situation garnered international attention, prompting various Jewish communities and leaders worldwide to intervene on his behalf. Notably, Rabbi Abraham Isaac Kook, first Ashkenazi Chief Rabbi of Mandatory Palestine (now Israel), sent urgent telegrams to Soviet officials, urging them to reconsider the charges against him.

The involvement of influential individuals, such as Yekaterina Peshkova, President of the Political Red Cross of the Soviet Union, was pivotal in advocating for his release. In the United States, Justice Louis Brandeis of the U.S. Supreme Court lobbied for Schneerson's release which led to US President Calvin Coolidge also making appeals to Soviet authorities, adding diplomatic pressure to the international advocacy efforts, which ultimately contributed to the commutation of the Rabbi's sentence from a death sentence to exile.

On July 3, 1927 (3 Tammuz, 5687), Rabbi Yosef Yitzchak Schneerson was exiled to Kostroma, a town in the Volga region of Russia. His exile was still under strict surveillance and control by the Soviet authorities. It was not until nine days later on July 12, 1927 (12 Tammuz 5687), that he was finally permitted to return to his home in Leningrad.

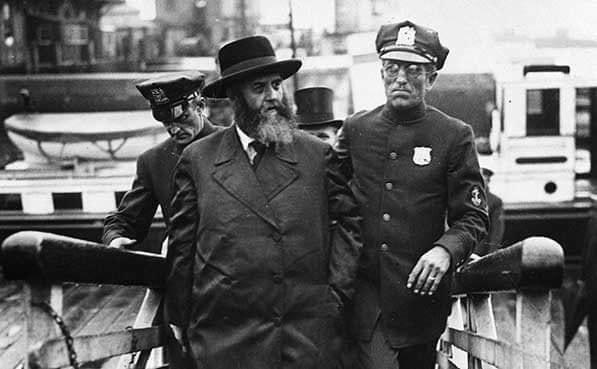
The Frierdiker Rebbe arriving in the United States on May 4, 1930

On the following day on July 13, 1927 (13 Tammuz 5687), he was actually fully liberated and returned home to Leningrad and was greeted by thousands of followers. Later on in late 1928, after navigating the complexities of Soviet bureaucracy, Rabbi Schneerson managed to get permission to leave Russia with the help of international pressure. He traveled to Riga, Latvia, where he stayed until 1929 before traveling to Mandatory Palestine. Later he would finally settle in the United States.

== Commemoration ==
The commemoration of the 12th and 13th of Tammuz was celebrated and observed by Rabbi Menachem Mendel Schneerson, the seventh Rebbe of Chabad-Lubavitch, who emphasized their importance in his teachings and leadership.

The Rebbe also would hold a magbis (fundraising campaign) on Yud Beis Tammuz for Reshet Oholei Yosef Yitzchok, the Chabad education network in Israel.

Communal gatherings known as Farbrengens are organized in Chabad centers, Yeshivas and Synagogues, where followers come together, where many hear speeches, sing niggunim (melodic tunes), and share inspiring stories about Rabbi Yosef Yitzchak's life and contributions.

This day is one of the three holidays named by Chabad-Lubavitch as the "Festival of Liberation" (Hebrew: חג הגאולה hag ha ge ula), The other two are the 10th of Kislev, marking the release of Rabbi Dovber Schneuri, the second Rebbe of Chabad-Lubavitch, from prison, and the 19th of Kislev, marking the release of Rabbi Shneur Zalman of Liadi, the first Rebbe of Chabad-Lubavitch, from prison during the Russian Empire.

Today the holiday is primarily celebrated by the Chabad-Lubavitch community. On these dates, it is customary in Chabad-Lubavitch to omit Tachanun, a penitential prayer recited on regular days.
