= N'shei Chabad =

Hasidic women's organization

- Nickname: Lubavitch Women's Organization
- Headquarters: Crown Heights, Kfar Chabad
- Publication: N'shei Chabad Newsletter
- Parent organization: Machne Israel
- Formerly called: Agudas N'Shei U'Bnos Chabad

N'shei Chabad, also known as the Lubavitch Women's Organization, is the official women's organization of the Chabad community. The organization was initially titled Agudas N'shei U'bnos Chabad (Council of the Women and Daughters of Chabad). It was founded at 770 Eastern Parkway in Crown Heights, New York City in 1955 by Rabbi Menachem Mendel Schneerson (1902–1994), the 7th Rebbe of Chabad. The organization offers Chabad women the opportunity to take an active role in community life. The group publishes a N'shei Chabad Newsletter, and organizes conventions to promote Hasidic outreach work.

== Chapters ==
In 1980, the N'shei Chabad had chapters in over 160 cities around the world, including close to 50 in Israel and close to 90 in the United States. N'shei Chabad of Crown Heights is the original branch established by the Rebbe, it is referred to as N'shei Chabad Central.

== N'shei Chabad Newsletter ==
Established in1974, N'shei Chabad puts out a newsletter 5 times a year. It was founded by Brana Shaina Deitsch, it's senior editor is Rishe Deitsch. It is published by and for Chabad women.

Senior Editor: Rishe Deitsch Providing religious content aimed at Jewish women based on the teachings of Torah and Chassidus. Each newsletter is 100 pages long. Topics include Chasidus, Chinuch (Jewish education), Chabad biographies, Jewish art, shlichus (emissaryship), health, housekeeping, and marriage among others. In 2025 the newsletter published a four-part series titled Tznius Saves Lives: The Rebbe’s talks on tznius.

== See also ==
- Chabad organizations
