= Panasaim =

- HaPanasaim
- ארגון הפנסאים
- Merged into: Tzeirei Agudat Chabad
- Formation: 2009
- Founded at: Kfar Chabad
- Merger of: Tzivot Hashem Kfar Chabad, Ogen
- Purpose: Chassidic Youth Programming
- Chairman: Rabbi Shimon Rabinowitz
- Secretary: Rabbi Shmarla Kubichek

Panasaim (Hebrew: הפנסאים) (transl. The Lamplighters) is a Chabad-Lubavitch Chassidic youth organization based in Kfar Chabad Israel.

The organization holds conferences, Shabbatons, and runs a publishing department. The Camp Gan Yisroel Eretz HaKodesh network is run in partnership with Panasaim. A publishing branch produces Chassidic educational booklets and weekly newsletters. It also hosts national conventions for Chabad children. The organization is affiliated with the Tzeirei Agudat Chabad of Israel. The name of the organization is derived from a saying by the fifth Chabad Rebbe Sholom Dovber Schneersohn, "A Chasid is a pansai (lamplighter) whose job is to illuminate the world". The organization maintains contact with the children of the Chabad Shluchim (emissaries) around the world and holds virtual conferences for them. The organization’s offices are located adjacent to the Chabad HQ, 770 Eastern Parkway, in The Shluchim Office Building in Brooklyn, New York, and in Israel in Kfar Chabad near the Tzeirei Agudat Chabad building. The organization also operates the Panasaim Choir.

Chairman of the Pansaim organization is Shimon Rabinowitz, and the organization's educational committee is headed by Rabbi Zalman Gopin The organization operates in collaboration with the global Tzivos Hashem organization in New York, Chabad Youth, and The Shluchim Office. The organization is recognized as an official youth movement and receives funding from the Ministry of Education.

== History ==
In 2009, a Chabad youth organization, called Ogen was established and operated among the children of Kfar Chabad and aligned with Chabad messianism theology, the belief that the Lubavitcher Rebbe is the Jewish moshiach. In response, six months later, an organization named at the time Tzivos Hashem Kfar Chabad was established by students of the Tomchei Temimim Yeshiva in Kfar Chabad. It was established with the goal of providing children with Chabad activities without the messianic Chabad content. The establishment of the two competing organizations sparked controversy and quarrels among children in Kfar Chabad. As a result of the tension, Rabbi of Kfar Chabad at the time, Rabbi Mordechai Shmuel Ashkenazi ordered the closure of both organizations and the establishment of a unified Chabad organization for the children of Kfar Chabad managed by the Kfar Chabad Committee. As a result, the organization Tzivot Hashem Kfar Chabad changed its name to Panasaim, and in 2012 began operating outside the boundaries of Kfar Chabad.

In 2011 the organization ran a campaign in honor of the Rebbe

In 2014, the organization was joined with Bat Melech and operates under the Chabad Youth Organization (Hebrew: ארגון נוער חב"ד) aka (ארגון נוער חב"ד, בת מלך, הפנסאים – צבאות ה', מועדון המעשים הטובים), a nonprofit body that administers several Chabad youth initiatives in Israel.

In 2016 , the organization inaugurated a permanent building in central Kfar Chabad.

2023 marked the end of a 5 year legal battle between Nei’dot Chabad Ltd. (Public Benefit Company) (Hebrew: ניידות חב"ד בע"מ (חל"צ) together with Rabbi David Nachshon against Chabad Youth Organization over use of the Tzivos Hashem logo and branding. The Israeli Trademark Registrar accepted all of the claims presented by the Chabad Youth Organization and ordered the deletion of the symbol as a private registration.

In September 2024, promotional Panasaim posters were ripped up in the Chabad neighborhood of Lod. The incident was reported by COL, following the incident, local rabbi of Lod, Rabbi Baruch Boaz Yurkovich, publicly condemned the act, describing it as violence directed against children and calling for unity among the community. The article did not identify a or attribute the vandalism to a specific motive.

== Camp Gan Yisroel Eretz HaKodesh ==
Panasaim is a partner in operating the Gan Yisroel Eretz HaKodesh network of summer camps in Israel. Educational seminars and training sessions for bochurs selected to serve as counselors and staff have been held at Panasaim Hall in central Kfar Chabad. in 2024, three hundred Tamimim (students of the Tomchei Temimim yeshiva system) participated in an educational seminar together before working at the 5 camps in the network.

== Publications ==
- Panasaim Tze'irim (Hebrew: פנסאים צעירים)
- Avokot Shel Or (Hebrew: אבוקות של אור)
- Hilchos Shabbos for Youth
