= Lubavitch Cheder Day School =

Location
- 1758 Ford Pkwy St. Paul, MN 55116
- Coordinates: 44°55′04″N 93°10′29″W

Information
- Other name: Chabad Lubavitch Jewish Educational Center
- School type: Chabad-Lubavitch
- Founded: 1977
- Founders: Rabbi Moshe and Mindelle Feller
- Director: Rabbi Shlomo Bendet
- Director of Development: Rabbi Yossi Bendet
- Grades: Preschool - 8th
- Gender: Co-ed
- Enrollment: 43 (2021)
- Student to teacher ratio: 4:1
- Affiliation: Merkos L'Inyonei Chinuch
- Gan Preschool: Preschool
- Website: https://www.cljec.com/}

Lubavitch Cheder Day School a.k.a. Chabad Lubavitch Jewish Educational Center is a Kindergarten through 8th grade Chabad Jewish day school with an attached 16 months through 5 year old preschool in Saint Paul, Minnesota United States.

The school was founded in 1977 by shaliach couple Rabbi Moshe and Mindelle Feller, Mrs. Feller served as founding principal. The couple began the Upper Midwest Merkos-Lubavitch House in 1961. They used the basement of the Chabad house in the first years of the school before upgrading to a trailer and then the modern school building. A duplex was added on the property to house the day care and preschool, and a playground added between them. In the 2017–2018 school year, 100 children from ages 16 months through eighth grade attend the preschool and school.

Enrollment has been steadily dropping, and as of 2021, was made up of 43 students. Today Rabbi Shlomo Bendet serves as executive director, Rabbi Yossi Bendet as director of development. The school runs intergenerational programming at a local senior center. The school is Co-ed with mixed classes in the younger grades, and separated classes for the older grades. Uniforms are required. The school is a member of JEM Foundation as well as Tzivos Hashem.

The preschool and daycare, known as Gan Preschool has a maximum capacity of 37 children and license number 1112282 During the summer, the preschool runs a Junior Gan Izzy summer program.
