= Gur Aryeh =

Gur Aryeh or variant may refer to:

- Gur Aryeh al haTorah, a rabbinic commentary by Rabbi Judah Loew ben Bezalel
- Kollel Gur Aryeh, the graduate rabbinical school of Yeshiva Rabbi Chaim Berlin in Brooklyn, New York

== People with the surname ==
- Shemaryahu Gurary or Shemaryahu Gur-Aryeh (1898–1989), Orthodox Rabbi
- Barry Gurary or Sholom Dovber Gur-Aryeh (1923–2005), Orthodox Rabbi and Physicist

== See also ==
- Anna Gourari (born 1972), classical pianist
