= Greystone Hotel =

Greystone Hotel may refer to:

- Greystone Miami Beach, 1939 art deco hotel in Miami Beach, Florida, known also as "Greystone Hotel"
- The Greystone, building in Upper West Side, Manhattan, New York, known also as "Greystone Hotel"
- Greystone Hotels, a hotel and hospitality company based in California, or its line of 10 hotels
- Greystone Lodge, hotel in Gatlinburg, Tennessee
