= Reshet Oholei Yosef Yitzchok =

- Named after: Yosef Yitzchak Schneersohn
- Formation: 1950
- Founder: Menachem Mendel Schneerson
- Location: Israel
- Director: Rabbi Eliyahu Krichevsky
- Parent organization: Merkos L'Inyonei Chinuch
- Subsidiaries: Beit Chinuch Chabad, Talmud Torah Chabad, Shalhavot Chabad, Gan Chabad
- Affiliations: Chabad
- Website: https://reshetchabad.com/

Reshet Oholei Yosef Yitzchok (Hebrew :רשת אהלי יוסף יצחק ליובאוויטש בארץ הקודש) is the national education network of Chabad Lubavich in Israel. It has four main branches, Talmud Torah for Lubavitcher boys, Beit Chinuch for Chabad and religious families, the Shalhavot network for the broader Israeli public, and Gan Chabad preschools for children from every background. The network claims roughly 600 schools, 40,000 students, and 4,000 staff. The system is supervised by the Israeli Ministry of Education. Reshet runs a publishing branch which publishes Chabad educational materials. It operates under Merkos L'Inyonei Chinuch.

== History ==
In 1950, the Lubavitcher Rebbe, Rabbi Menachem Mendel Schneerson, approached Chabad Shluchim in Israel and requested that they establish a new educational network in honor of his father in law, the 6th rebbe; Yosef Yitzchak Schneersohn. The network was intended to provide an option for new immigrants who settled in places where there were no religious schools. The Rebbe also requested that this network be state-owned. The first schools of the network were established in Jaffa, Rehovot, Kfar Saba and Jerusalem, over the years the network expanded across Israel.

In 2000 Reshet launched the first online Chabad educational resource center, which includes tens of thousands of worksheets, tests, presentations, and learning materials, produced by the teachers and staff of the network. The database is actively updated and in use across the network.

In 2026, the Reshet network's national enrollment headquarters reported that enrollment and institutional expansion had reached an all-time high. A centralized call center staffed by telephone operators assists parents in identifying the preschool or school nearest to their home. Preparations for the school year began months in advance and included coordination meetings between shluchim and school administrators across Israel.

The growth prompted a network-wide effort encompassing organizational, rebranding, advertising initiatives, and the use of surveys and focus groups. The resulting campaign features advertisements, promotional videos, and informational content for parents, with more than 70 targeted social-media advertising campaigns currently operating across Israeli cities and directed at diverse demographics. Reshet notes that the outbreak of the October 7th IDF operation, has led many parents to seek a Haredi educational framework.

Since its establishment, Reshet has held an annual national convention for all students in the network. In recent years the convention has been hosted through livestream.

== Beit Chinuch Chabad ==
Beit Chinuch Chabad is the sub-organization which operates boys and girls schools throughout Israel aimed at the general Israeli population including Masortim, Datim, and Haredim, as opposed to schools for Lubavitcher families. The schools incorporate Chabad philosophy together with secular education.

Olim L'Aleph is a program to welcome students who will be entering first grade at Beit Chinuch schools. The program includes introductory and readiness meetings. It offers an online readiness course for first-grade immigrants. The children are educated on what to expect at school.

== Shalhavot Chabad ==
Shalhavot school's serve the broader Jewish population in Israel. Six new schools opened in 2023. According to Anash.org, 10% of all new schools opening in Israel are Shalhavot Chabad schools. The site also claims the strong growth is attributed to a trend of state run schools shifting towards pluralistic curriculums.

== Gan Chabad ==
Gan Chabad is a preschool/kindergarten network part of Reshet Oholei Yosef Yitzchok. The network runs 466 preschools, serving 15,033 students with 1,186 staff members. Gan Chabad is the fastest growing system under the Reshet umbrella, opening 36 new pre-schools in a single year.

== Publications ==
- Shofra (magazine) - part of the training program for educational missionaries of the Oheli Yosef Yitzhak Lubavitch network, Historical reviews and revelations, fascinating opinion columns, an in-depth look at the educational challenges and news on the agenda of educational missionaries
