= Sami Rohr =

American philanthropist.(1926–2012)

Sami Rohr (April 4, 1926 – August 5, 2012) was a German-born American real estate developer and philanthropist. Over his life, he donated at least $250 million to various Jewish causes, particularly the Chabad movement.

== Early life ==
Sami Rohr was born on April 4, 1926, in Berlin, Germany. He was the only child Oskar and Perla Gelbard Rohr. His father was a real estate investor, once described as one of Berlin's "leading real estate men".

Thirteen days after Kristallnacht, the Nazi pogrom in November 1938 that terrorized Jews across Germany, the Rohr family fled Germany to Antwerp, Belgium. They then traveled through Lyon, France, to Switzerland. Rohr's parents were sent to a refugee camp in Morgins, and Sami went to a children's home near Basel. Most of the Rohrs' extended family were murdered in the Holocaust. After World War II, the Rohrs moved to Paris.

Sami's father sent him to an aunt in Bogotá, Colombia, in 1950, fearing that the outbreak of the Korean War presaged another world war. In Colombia, Sami began the real estate career that would make him a fortune. He is credited with "almost singlehandedly developing the west side of Bogotá.

The Rohrs moved from South America to Bal Harbour, Florida, in 1982 due to rising crime.

== Philanthropy ==
Rohr donated at least $250 million to various Jewish causes in the course of his lifetime. He was a major benefactor of the Chabad-Lubavitch movement, especially its work in the former Soviet Union.

After meeting with a Chabad representative, Ephraim Wolff, in the 1970s, Rohr increased his support, donating tens of millions of dollars to Chabad Houses and other Jewish institutions. Rohr's children also supported the Chabad movement. His daughter Lilian provided financial support for Chabad.org.

According to the Forward, Rohr viewed his philanthropy as an investment in the Jewish people. According to Moshe Kotlarsky of Chabad, Rohr invested in Kiruv, Chabad's outreach efforts, towards the same end.

Rohr had a specific interest in restoring synagogues in the former Soviet Union which had been seized or nationalized by the government. He contributed to building campaigns and underwrote the salaries of Chabad emissaries. By 2006, Rohr and his family were paying the salaries of more than 500 Chabad emissaries across the world.

== Personal ==
Rohr met his wife Charlotte Kastner in 1952 in Santiago, Chile. Kastner was born in Czechoslovakia, and had lost both of her parents at the Auschwitz concentration camp. The couple married in Buenos Aires, Argentina, in 1953 and had three children, including George Rohr. Charlotte died in 2007. Rohr died from heart failure on August 5, 2012, in Miami.

== Legacy ==
On the occasion of Rohr's 80th birthday in 2006, his children created in Sami Rohr Prize for Jewish Literature for emerging writers about Jewish topics. At its inception, the $100,000 prize was the largest literary prize in North America.
