= David Masinter =

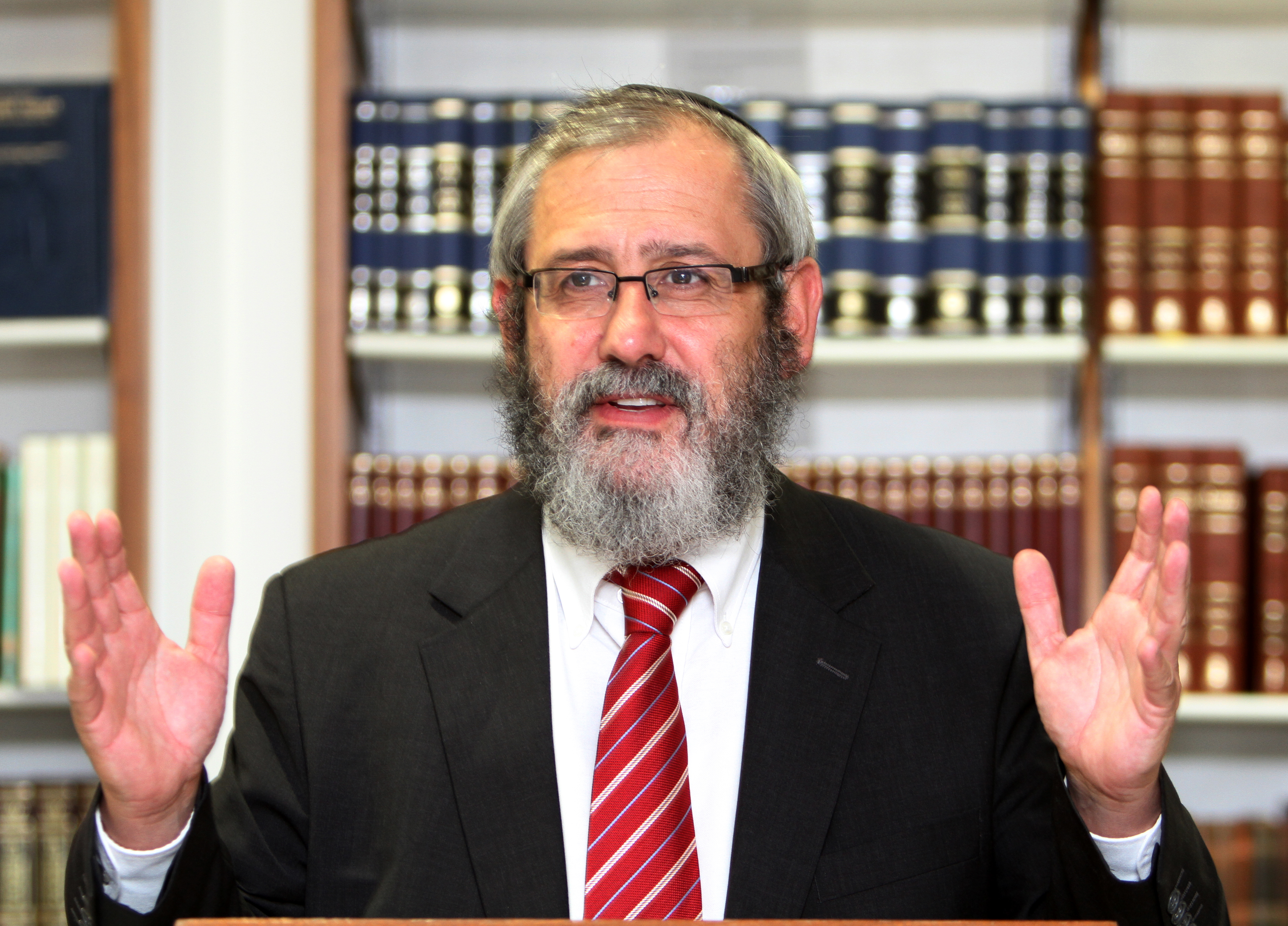

Rabbi David Masinter (born 25 November 1959) is a Rabbi, Founder and Director of the Miracle Drivers annual charity drive, and Director of Chabad House in Johannesburg.

== Early life ==
Rabbi David Masinter was born in the small town of Parys, Orange Free State, South Africa to a family of Lithuanian Jewish descent. He was schooled in Johannesburg and went on to study in Yeshivas Tomchei Tmimim at Kfar Chabad, Israel. He received his Bachelor of Religious Education degree from the Rabbinical College of America, and Rabbinical Ordination in 1982 from Central Yeshivas Tomchei Tmimim, Brooklyn, New York.

== Career ==
Upon Ordination, Rabbi Masinter worked for Chabad's newly founded children's organization, Tzivos Hashem (The Army of God) and was tasked with revitalizing its children's magazine – Moshiach Times. It was at this stage that he met Al Jaffee, the artist for Mad Magazine and convinced him to develop the Shpy character (pronounced Spy with a Sh..) for Mashiach Times. This liaison has lasted over a quarter of a century. Other contributors included Dave Berg and Joe Kubert from DC Comics. Additionally, Alison Leigh Cowan from The New York Times wrote an article referencing Rabbi Masinter for his role in involving artist Al Jaffee in the children's organization.

In 1985 the Rabbi returned to South Africa to work for Chabad Lubavitch South Africa and was appointed Director of Chabad House Johannesburg in 1989.

In the years that followed, together with his colleague Rabbi Michael Katz, Rabbi Masinter introduced a variety of outreach and educational programmes. In the late 1990s he teamed up with Mike Schalit of the Net#work BBDO advertising agency to develop advertising campaigns aimed at creating and enhancing Jewish awareness.

=== Miracle Drive ===
The Miracle Drive Trust was instituted to fund Chabad House in Johannesburg and its spectrum of programmes for all age groups. It was launched in 1989, with the support of John Newbury, Chairman of Nissan South Africa ('Nissan' means 'miracle' in Hebrew), and the late Meyer Kahn of SA Breweries. Nissan donated a car every year, which was raffled, and the tradition continued for over 30 years. Today the Miracle Drive is claimed to be one of the biggest charity events in the southern hemisphere, drawing up to 1800 people to its annual gala dinner.

=== 1. Grow Your Life Book Series ===
Because of challenges facing South Africa's previously disadvantaged children, the Rabbi co-authored the Grow Your Life series of books aimed at giving children an aspiration for their future.

This project is aimed at educating the disadvantaged youth in South Africa on the importance of entrepreneurial skills, whilst simultaneously improving their reading skills. With less than 6% of public schools in South Africa having libraries, it is imperative to aid in the mission to give children the gift of literacy.

Over 400,000 copies have been printed. Grow Your Life has also led to the development of job creation programs.

=== 2. Grow Your Life Library Project ===
The overall goal of Miracle Drive is to offer assistance and welfare to the greater South African community, and therefore, in continuing with this vision statement, Rabbi Masinter decided to focus some of Miracle Drive's resources on creating mobile libraries throughout a number of informal settlements in Gauteng.

Thus, 21 libraries have been installed in various schools and townships in Gauteng.

The vision is to instil in each child a sense of literacy, responsibility and entrepreneurship and in turn teach learners how they can better themselves and the lives of those around them no matter what background they come from. The goal is to address illiteracy and provide invaluable opportunities to the youth, one library at a time.

The libraries are built from 12-meter containers with doors and windows installed. The buildings are then transformed into a workspace with tables, chairs, shelves and a collection of the ‘Grow Your Life’ book series.

=== ARK Campaign - Acts of Random Kindness ===
ARK is an acronym for Acts of Random Kindness. The goal of the campaign is to get people to fill up the yellow ARK with spare change, and when full, donate it to someone less fortunate.

The ARK project is a part of Rabbi Masinter's the Change Our World for Good Campaign.

The success of the ARK project has seen over 800 000 ARK's distributed by May 2024, and has subsequently inspired Rabbi Masinter to launch new innovative initiatives.

=== Chabad's Goodness and Kindness Centre ===
With the help of Natie Kirsh, Rabbi Masinter purchased a small building in Sandton, the heart of South Africa's business capital. Chabad's Goodness and Kindness Centre will be used to bring people from all backgrounds, including those from previously disadvantaged homes, in order to teach them about the value of "goodness and kindness" in this world.

This is an ongoing project.

== Personal life ==
The Rabbi is married to Chaya née Tanzer, daughter of Marcia and Rabbi Avraham Tanzer (Rosh Yeshiva, Yeshiva College, South Africa). They have six children and twelve grandchildren.
