= Nissan Mindel =

Latvian-born American rabbi, author and editor (1912–1999)

Rabbi Dr. Nissan Mindel
- Born: 1912; Riga
- Died: 1999 (aged 86–87); Brooklyn, NY
- Occupations: Rabbi, author, editor
- Organization: Chabad-Lubavitch
- Notable work: Chabad Philosophy
- Title: Dr. Rabbi
- Parent(s): Yaakov Yitzchak and Bunia Mindel

Nissan Mindel was a Chabad Hasidic rabbi, author, editor, and served on the administrative staff of Menachem Mendel Schneerson, the seventh Lubavitcher Rebbe.

== Background ==
Nissan Mindel was born in Riga, Latvia in March, 1912, one of nine children, to Yaakov Yitzchak and Bunia Mindel. His connection with Chabad started in 1928 when the sixth Lubavitcher Rebbe, Yosef Yitzchak Schneersohn, lived in Riga. In 1930, He traveled to England where he stayed for a few years and where he got married in 1937, after which he returned to Riga. He left Riga for America by way of Sweden together with Yosef Yitzchak and his entourage, arriving at New York in March 1940, and settled at Long Beach where he was one of the founders of the Young Israel of Long Beach. He died in Crown Heights, Brooklyn in 1999.

In the United States, Yosef Yitzchak suggested that Mindel translate Schneur Zalman of Liadi's Tanya into English, an effort that had been attempted numerous times before without success.

Yosef Yitzchak also requested that Mindel write a monthly magazine for children. The first issue of the children's magazine, Shmuessen Mit Kinder (in Yiddish), was published for Hanukkah 1942. A second monthly, Talks and Tales (in English), was added shortly afterward. These two magazines were published every month for the next 47 years. Menachem Mendel Schneerson checked every issue of Talks and Tales before it went to print, continuing to do so after he became Rebbe, and Chaim Mordechai Aizik Hodakov checked the Shmuessen Mit Kinder.

After the war ended, his wife was able to join him in the United States. She helped with translating and proofreading the children's magazines and other works.

In 1942, He accompanied Yosef Yitzchak on his trip to Chicago, and in 1947, he sent him to France, England, and Germany on several fact-finding social and educational missions.

In the 1950s and 1960s, Menachem Mendel sent him numerous times to Russia, to retrieve manuscripts and to strengthen the spirits of the Jews behind the Iron Curtain; to South Africa for Jewish communal matters; to the Suez Canal for the printing of the Tanya; and to Israel for communal matters and meetings with dignitaries and political figures. In the 1970s and 1980s, he sent him to Washington, D.C., and to Albany, New York, for conferences on education and aging, as well as on missions to Russia to retrieve manuscripts and books and to Israel for educational purposes.

Mindel recorded a great deal of Chabad history and helped edit the memoirs of the sixth Lubavitcher Rebbe, Yosef Yitzchak.

== Education ==
While in Riga, Mindel attended Yeshivah Torah Im Derech Eretz, which incorporated both Torah and secular studies, as espoused by Samson Raphael Hirsch. While in England, he received his B.A. and M.A. from University of Manchester, where he studied economics and Semitic languages. His dissertation was a comparative study of the economics of Latvia and England. In 1962 he earned a PhD in philosophy from Columbia University in New York.

== Family ==
Mindel was married to Necha (Nettie), the daughter of his uncle, Avraham Sender Nemtzov.

== Published works ==
Mindel authored works published by Chabad's Kehot Publication Society including the first official translation of the Tanya in English. His works include:

- The Tanya – the official Chabad English translation of the Tanya
- Rabbi Schneur Zalman of Liadi – a biography of the Chabad movement's founder
- The Philosophy of Chabad – a work exploring the central topics of Chabad philosophy
- The Lubavitcher Rebbe’s Memoirs – a three-volume work tracing the roots of the Chabad movement
- The Letter and the Spirit – a compilation of the English correspondence of Menachem Mendel Schneerson, covering a range of Jewish topics
- Talks and Tales a monthly magazine for children
- My Prayer – a two-volume work on Jewish prayer
- Our People – a multi-volume work on Jewish history
- The Storyteller – a collection of Jewish children stories
- The Call of the Shofar – a book of Jewish children stories
- The Complete Festival Series – a multi-volume work on the Jewish holidays
- The Commandments – a short philosophical treatise on the Commandments
