= Army of God =

Army of God may refer to:

== Christianity ==
In worldview and social life:

- The biblical heavenly host
- Militia Christi of Western, Roman Catholic world
- Army of God (terrorist organization), a Christian anti-abortion organization in the United States

In art and literature:

- Army of God, which fought against King John in the First Barons' War, led by the "Marshal of the Army of God" Robert Fitzwalter
- Army of God (Bonekickers), an episode of the BBC archaeology drama, Bonekickers

== Islam ==
- Jundallah (Iran), Arabic for "The Army of Allah", a terrorist Sunni (sic) Muslim Islamist organization
- Jundallah (Pakistan), as above but with separate leadership and orientation

== Judaism ==
- Tzivos Hashem, Hebrew (with Ashkenazi pronunciation) for "Army of God", a youth group created by the Chabad Lubavitch movement

== See also ==
- God's Army (disambiguation)
