= Friendship Circle =

Friendship circle may refer to:

- Friendship Circle (organization), a children's charity run by the Chabad Hasidic movement
- Friendship Circle (sculpture), a collaborative art installation in Portland, Oregon in the U.S.
- Friendship circles, a type of cookie sold by the Girl Scouts of the USA
