= Yehuda Krinsky =

American Hasidic rabbi and Chabad administrator

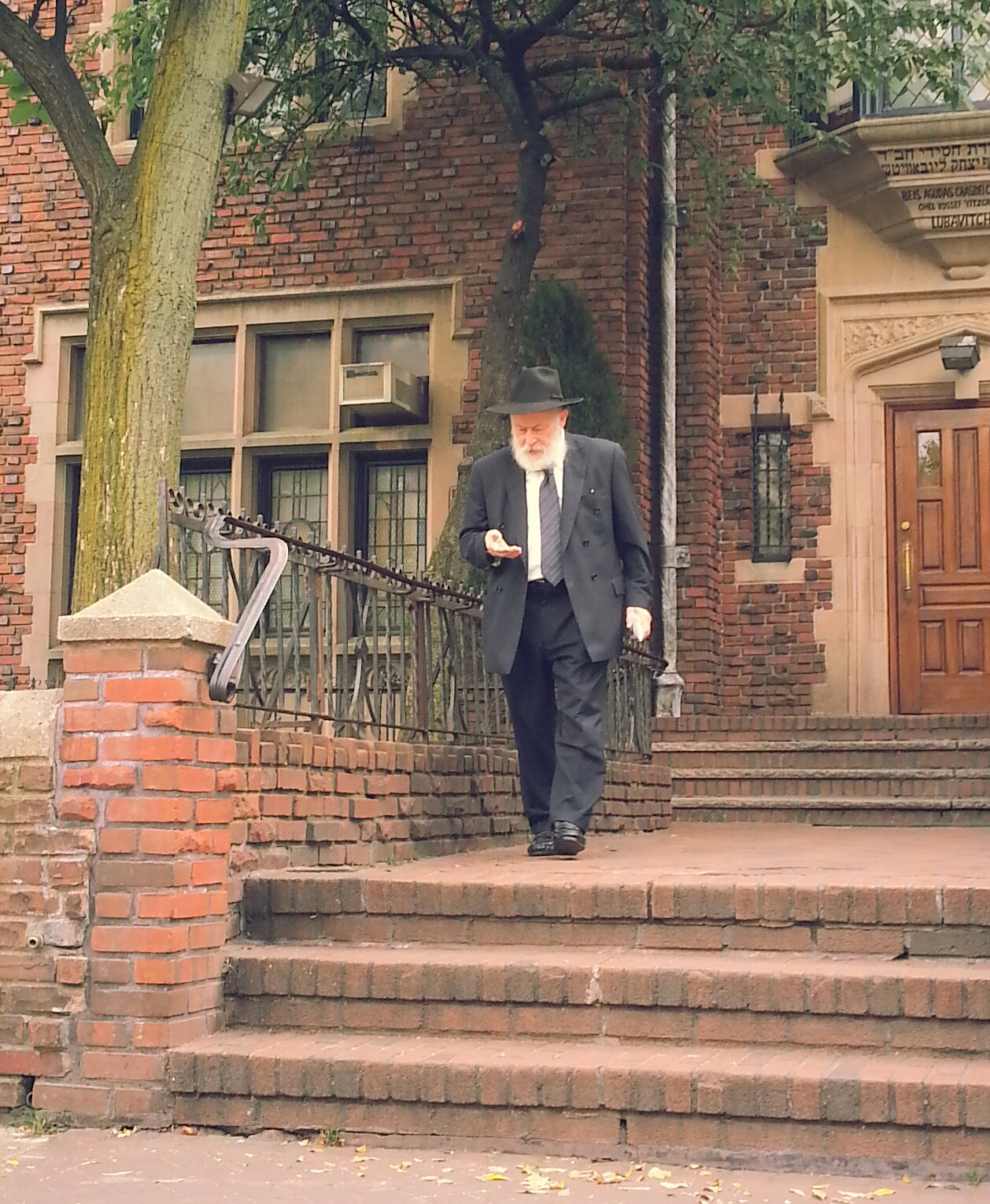
- Rabbi Yehuda Krinsky outside 770 Eastern Parkway
- Born: Chaim Yehuda Krinsky; December 3, 1933 (age 92); Boston, Massachusetts
- Occupation: Chabad administrator
- Years active: 1954 - Present

Chaim Yehuda ("Yudel") Krinsky (born December 3, 1933, in Boston, Massachusetts) is a rabbi and a leader in the Chabad-Lubavitch movement. He has served in various positions of the movement's administrative staff since 1954, and as a personal secretary to its chief rabbi, Menachem Mendel Schneerson, and is chairman of the movement's main institutions.

In 1988, after Schneerson's wife died, he named Krinsky sole executor of his will, later probated and recorded in New York.

As of 2004, some consider Rabbi Krinsky as one of the most influential figures within the Chabad movement.

== Biography ==
Krinsky grew up in Dorchester, Massachusetts and was educated at the Boston Latin School. At the age of 12, he was sent by his parents to study at the Central Lubavitch Yeshiva in Brooklyn, where he received his rabbinic ordination. He joined the Lubavitcher Rebbe's staff in 1952 as a driver.

== Activities ==
In 1956 Krinsky was invited by Schneerson to join his secretariat, headed by Chaim Mordechai Aizik Hodakov. Krinsky's position included work on behalf of the Merkos L'Inyonei Chinuch, the educational arm of the Chabad-Lubavitch movement. At that time, Schneerson also appointed Krinsky as his spokesperson and that of the movement. In 1961, Krinsky founded the Lubavitch News Service, which included disseminating Schneerson's talks around the world via satellite.

In 1970, Schneerson appointed Krinsky to the administrative boards of the movement's umbrella organization, Agudas Chasidei Chabad, its educational arm, Merkos L'Inyonei Chinuch and its social-services arm, Machne Israel.

Schneerson selected Krinsky to serve as the official secretary of the movement's three central organizations, Agudas Chasidei Chabad, Merkos L'Inyonei Chinuch, and Machne Israel, the movement's social services arm.

In 1985, Krinsky initiated and led the legal battle on behalf of Agudas Chasidei Chabad to reclaim the books stolen by Barry Gurary in the historic case of Agudas Chasidei Chabad v. Gourary.

In 1988, Schneerson founded the Keren Hachomesh Charitable Foundation in memory of his Wife Rebbetzin Chaya Mushka Schneerson, and appointed Krinsky as vice president and treasurer.

In 1989, Krinsky founded the Lubavitch International Magazine.

== Family ==
Krinsky married Devorah Kasinetz, daughter of Rabbi Zev and Ethel Kasinetz. Their children are:

- Rabbi Levi Krinsky, director of Chabad of New Hampshire
- Rabbi Hillel David Krinsky, who is married to Shterna Sarah Garelik, daughter of Rabbi Gershon Mendel Garelik, Chief Chabad Emissary of Milan, Italy. And is the founder of Jewish Educational Media.
- Menachem Mendel Krinsky, who is married to Miriam Turner of Chicago
- Rabbi Shmaya Krinsky, who is married to Rivkah Gutnick, daughter of Australian commodities magnate Joseph Gutnick
- Sheine B. Krinsky, who is married to Rabbi Yosef B. Friedman, associate director of the Kehot Publication Society
- Chana Krinsky, who is married to Rabbi Joseph Futerfas, director of Camp Gan Israel, New York

== Recognition ==
Krinsky appeared in several lists of influential American Jews, including the Forward 50 in 2005.

From 2007 to 2013, Newsweek magazine compiled an annual list of the fifty most influential rabbis in the United States. Krinsky was in the top five every year.
