= Chaim Mordechai Aizik Hodakov =

Latvian rabbi (1902–1993)

Rabbi Chaim Mordechai Aizik Hodakov (12 January 1902 – 23 April 1993) was the chief of staff of the secretariat of the Lubavitcher Rebbe, Rabbi Menachem Mendel Schneerson for more than 40 years. From 1950, until his death, Hodakov served as chairman of Agudas Chasidei Chabad, the umbrella organization of the Chabad-Lubavitch movement.

== Early life ==
Chaim Mordechai Aizik was born in the Russian town of Beshenkowitz on January 12, 1902 to Sholom Yisroel and Chaya Treina Hodakov. In 1904 he moved to Riga, Latvia with his parents, where he studied in the Navahrudak Mussar movement.

He was appointed principal of the Torah V'Derech Eretz school in Riga at the age of 18. In 1934 he was appointed the inspector of Jewish schools by the Latvian Ministry of Education. His close ties (through Mordehai Dubin) with the dictatorial regime of Karlis Ulmanis, and his strict orthodoxy, accompanied by the radical antisocialism and mass lock-outs of left-orientated teachers caused him to be unpopular with the secular circles of Latvian Jewry.

== Involvement in Lubavitch ==
When the sixth Lubavitcher Rebbe, Rabbi Yosef Yitzchok Schneersohn, moved to Riga (from Russia) in 1928, Hodakov joined his staff.

In 1940, when the Schneersohn escaped from Nazi-occupied Poland, he asked Hodakov and his wife to accompany him to the United States as part of his official entourage. In 1942, Schneersohn appointed him director of Merkos L'Inyonei Chinuch (the educational arm of the Lubavitch movement), Mahane Israel (Chabad) (the social service arm), and Kehot Publication Society.

== Role as secretary ==
In 1950, when Menachem Mendel Schneerson succeeded his father-in-law as rebbe, Hodakov became his Chief-of-Staff and head of his secretariat. He was later appointed chairman of Agudas Chasidei Chabad, the umbrella organization that oversees the worldwide network of Chabad-Lubavitch organizations and institutions.

== Death ==
He died on April 23, 1993, after a brief illness.
