= Roving Rabbis =

- Formation: 1943
- Parent organization: Merkos L'Inyonei Chinuch

Roving Rabbis is a division of Merkos L'Inyonei Chinuch, which dispatches pairs of young Chabad rabbinical students, colloquially known as Roving Rabbis, to small and isolated Jewish communities around the world. Hundreds of rabbinical students participate in Passover and summer visitation programs, building Jewish awareness and spreading Torah knowledge. To date, the program has sent students to more than 150 countries.

The Rabbinical Student Visitation Program began in 1943, when Rabbi Schneerson dispatched the first pairs of students to ten cities in Upstate New York. Cities in California were added to the program in 1944, as were cities in the Southern United States in 1945. By 1948, the summer program numbered 20 students and 100 American cities. Students were also sent to Jewish farmers residing throughout the Northeastern United States, many of whom were European immigrants. The students were sent in pairs, usually one American student and one European-immigrant student.

In the early 1950s, the Rebbe added international destinations to the summer program, personally consulting maps and planning the itineraries.

Currently, 400 Roving Rabbis participate in the annual summer program. They distribute thousands of mezuzot, other religious articles such as tefillin and kosher food, and tens of thousands of Jewish information packets each year.

The students interact with both individuals and families. They often go door to door, teaching women how to light Shabbat candles and showing men how to put on tefillin for the first time. They speak about Jewish education, answer questions, and give bar mitzvah lessons.

Their visits are often anticipated by the local population. On their 2010 swing through the islands of Aruba, Bonaire and Curaçao, for example, the two Roving Rabbis were summoned to the office of Aruba Prime Minister Mike Eman, who is Jewish. Eman spoke with them about Jewish heritage, listened as they blew the shofar (it was the Hebrew month of Elul, when the shofar is blown daily in synagogues), and donned a pair of tefillin. After completing their visit to the islands, the students returned to the Prime Minister's office so he could put on tefillin again, and he asked them to arrange for him to have his own pair of tefillin.

The Roving Rabbis share their experiences and communicate with each other on their own blog site.
