= God's Army =

God's Army may refer to:

- God's Army (film), a motion picture involving missionaries of The Church of Jesus Christ of Latter-day Saints
- God's Army (revolutionary group), an armed Christian terrorist group in rebellion against the military government of Myanmar
- The Prophecy, a horror film known in Europe as God's Army
- The biblical heavenly host

== See also ==
- Army of God (disambiguation)
