= George Rohr =

American businessman and philanthropist

George Rohr is an American businessman and philanthropist. He is the co-founder and President of NCH Capital Inc, a private equity firm.

== Education and personal life ==
Rohr was born in 1954 in Bogota, Colombia to Sami Rohr and Charlotte Rohr. He graduated from Harvard College and received his MBA from Harvard Business School. As an undergraduate he was President of the Harvard Lampoon during its 100th anniversary year in 1976. He and his wife Pamela L. Rohr live in New York City and Bal Harbour, Florida. They have four children.

== NCH Capital ==
Since 1993 the NCH group of funds has been investing across asset classes in Eastern Europe and the former Soviet Union on behalf of their institutional clients. Rohr began investing in the region shortly after the collapse of the Soviet Union, and was among the earliest Western participants in the privatization opportunities offered by several of the region's markets. In addition to its investments in real-estate, private equity and public securities, NCH is among the largest agribusiness investors in the Black Sea region. In 2010 NCH extended its investment operations to Latin America.

== Philanthropy ==
Rohr's principal philanthropic focus has been on Jewish education and literacy, particularly through initiatives such as the Rohr Jewish Learning Institute, the world's largest Jewish adult education network; the establishment of more than 150 Chabad Houses across college campuses in North America, and on the revival of Jewish communal life in Eastern Europe and the former Soviet Union in partnership with Chabad. He serves as chairman and principal benefactor of Chabad on Campus International Foundation, the Rohr Jewish Learning Institute (JLI),

In 2006, Rohr and his sisters established the Sami Rohr Prize for Jewish Literature to honor, on the occasion of his 80th birthday, their father's lifelong love of Jewish writing. The annual award recognizes the unique role of contemporary writers in the transmission and examination of the Jewish experience. The $100,000 prize is intended to encourage emerging writers whose work demonstrates a fresh vision and the promise of further growth. In conjunction with this award, Rohr established the Sami Rohr Jewish Literary Institute, a forum devoted to the continuity of Jewish literature. In 2022 the Sami Rohr Prize entered into an operating collaboration agreement with the National Library of Israel. Additionally, Rohr is a member of the Board of Trustees of the Avi Chai Foundation.
