= The Greystone =

Building in Manhattan, New York

Coordinates: 40°47′28″N 73°58′25″W

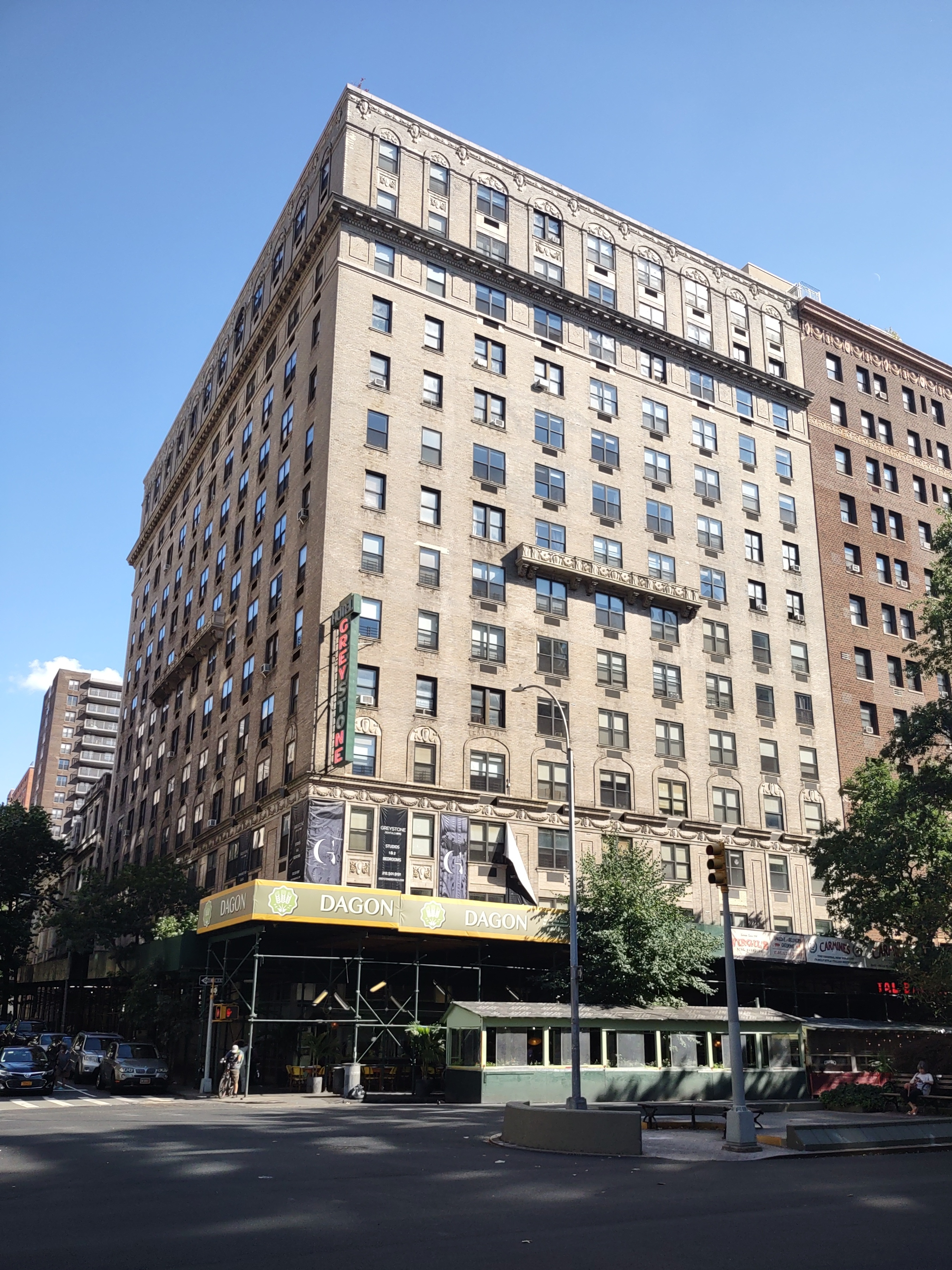
The Greystone in 2022

The Greystone, also known as the Greystone Hotel, is a fourteen-story building at 212-218 West 91st Street on the Upper West Side of Manhattan in New York City, United States. Samuel and Henry A. Blumenthal bought the property from the Astor estate in 1922 with marketing beginning two years later. It was designed by the architectural firm of Schwartz & Gross.

The building is currently in residential use and the former ballroom has since been a series of restaurants including Polistina's and Big Daddy's.

Among its notable residents was

- Alberto Arroyo.
- The sixth Rebbe of Chabad-Lubavitch, Rabbi Yosef Yitzchak Schneersohn.
