= Shemaryahu Gurary =

Rabbi Shemaryahu Gurary
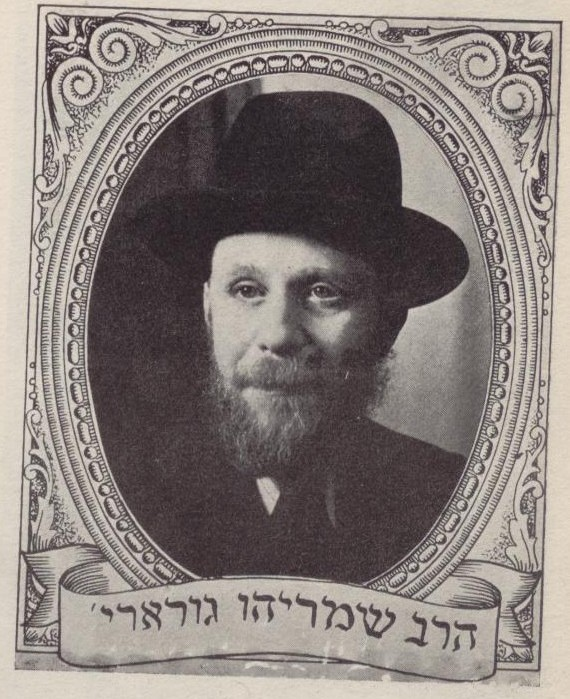
- 1942 photo of RaShaG

Personal life
- Born: 1897
- Died: 1989
- Buried: Queens, New York
- Spouse: Chana
- Children: Barry Gurary

Religious life
- Religion: Judaism
- Denomination: Chabad

Shemaryahu Gurary, also known by his Hebrew initials as Rashag, (1897–1989) was a rabbi following the Chabad-Lubavitch dynasty of Hasidism. His father was Menachem Mendel Gurary. He was a son-in-law of Yosef Yitzchok Schneersohn, the sixth Chabad-Lubavitch rebbe, and the brother-in-law of Menachem Mendel Schneerson, the seventh. He worked with his father-in-law in Russia and Poland and moved to the U.S. in 1940.

== Biography ==
He was the director in Warsaw of the Tomchei Temimim yeshiva network.

Upon the death of his father-in-law in 1950, he was considered as a possible successor to him but soon ceded his position to his brother-in-law Menachem Mendel Scheerson.

Gurary's son Barry Gurary had disputes with the Chabad-Lubavitch dynasty.
