= Machne Israel =

Social service organization of the Chabad-Lubavitch movement

- MACHNE ISRAEL INC
- מחנה ישראל
- Founder: Yosef Yitzchok Schneersohn
- Headquarters: 770 Eastern Parkway
- Location: Crown Heights, United States
- Chairman: Rabbi Yehuda Krinsky
- Comptroller: Rabbi Zalman Feldman
- Parent organization: Agudas Chasidei Chabad
- Subsidiaries: Tzivos Hashem N'shei Chabad Colel Chabad Taharas Hamishpocho International
- Website: https://machne.org/

Machne Israel (Hebrew: מחנה ישראל) is the social service organization of the Chabad-Lubavitch movement. Its parent organization is Agudas Chasidei Chabad, the central Chabad organization.

== Founding ==
Machne Israel was founded by the 6th Chabad Rebbe, Yosef Yitzchok Schneersohn in May 1941, he remained at the head of the organization until his death in 1950 and appointed his son in-law Rabbi Menachem Mendel Schneersohn as the chairman of the executive committee. Rabbi Yehuda Krinsky serves as chairman. The Machne Israel Development Fund was later founded in 1984 in order to help fund and expand Chabad institutions.

== Mission ==
The organization's stated mission is to encourage Torah observance, performance of Mitzvot and bring people back to Teshuva. Additionally, the organization's stated goal is to spread the previous Lubavitcher Rebbe's message of "The quicker to Teshuva, the quicker the redemption (Moshiach) will arrive".

== Religious initiatives ==
Machne Israel has initiated a number of religious initiatives among members of the community.

- Mishnayos Baal Peh (Memorization of the Mishnah) – The six orders of the Mishnah are divided among the participants via a raffle, with the whole Mishna being completed once a year. At its completion a Siyum celebration takes place.
- Tehillim Societies – Mahane Israel creates Tehillim societies for the daily saying of psalms as well as enhancing and encouraging the existing ones. These societies work with the Universal Tehillim Society founded in the Old City of Jerusalem.
- Chalukat Hashas – The whole Talmud is split amongst the members of Mahane Israel, with each member taking upon himself one tractate to complete by year's end.

== Charity Funds ==
- Machne Israel Development Fund –
- Kupas Rabeinu (the Fund of our Rebbe) – A fund originally instituted by the fifth Rebbe, Sholom Dovber Schneersohn, it serves general purposes.
- Keren Mamosh – A fund established in honor of the Rebbe during the week of Gimmel Tammuz, Keren means fund, and MaMoSh is in reference to the name Menachem Mendel Schneerson. The fund's stated goal is to strengthen Chabad-Lubavitch institutions around the globe. The fund offers grants for the creation of Mitzvah Tanks.
- Keren Hachomesh
- Keren Hashana – A yearly fundraiser for the needy taking place during the High Holidays.
- Keren Mamosh – A fund established in honor of the Rebbe during the week of Gimmel Tammuz, Keren means fund, and MaMoSh is in reference to the name Menachem Mendel Schneerson. The fund's stated goal is to strengthen Chabad-Lubavitch institutions around the globe. The fund offers grants for the creation of Mitzvah Tanks.
- Tishrei Fund
- Keren Chana
- Ata Horeisa
- Yud Tes Kislev-Chanukah
- Keren Torah
- Passover Fund
- Keren Oholei Yosef Yitzchak
- DollarDaily.org – A daily-giving fund that encourages donors to contribute one dollar a day to provide financial assistance to Chabad shluchim and Chabad Houses worldwide. The fund allows shluchim to request support for personal, family, and community needs.

== Elections ==
Machne Israel board members are elected. Rabbi Yossi New, Rabbi Berl Goldman, and Rabbi Levi Gansburg and Rabbi Yitzchok Wolf are named as new board members in 2022.
