= Hasidut =

Hasidut (from the Hebrew: חסידות, Sephardic pronunciation: [ħasiˈdut] [ḥasidut]; Ashkenazic pronunciation: [χasiˈdus] [chasidus]; "piety" or "loving-kindness"), alternatively transliterated as hasiduth, may refer to:

- Hasidic Judaism - a branch of Orthodox Judaism, founded in 18th-century Eastern Europe by Rabbi Yisroel ben Eliezer (Baal Shem Tov)
- Hasidic philosophy - the teachings, interpretations, and various practices of Judaism as articulated by the Hasidic movement
- List of Hasidic dynasties

== See also ==
- Hasid (term)
- Hasideans
- Ashkenazi Hasidim
