= Chabad on Campus International Foundation =

Jewish college organization

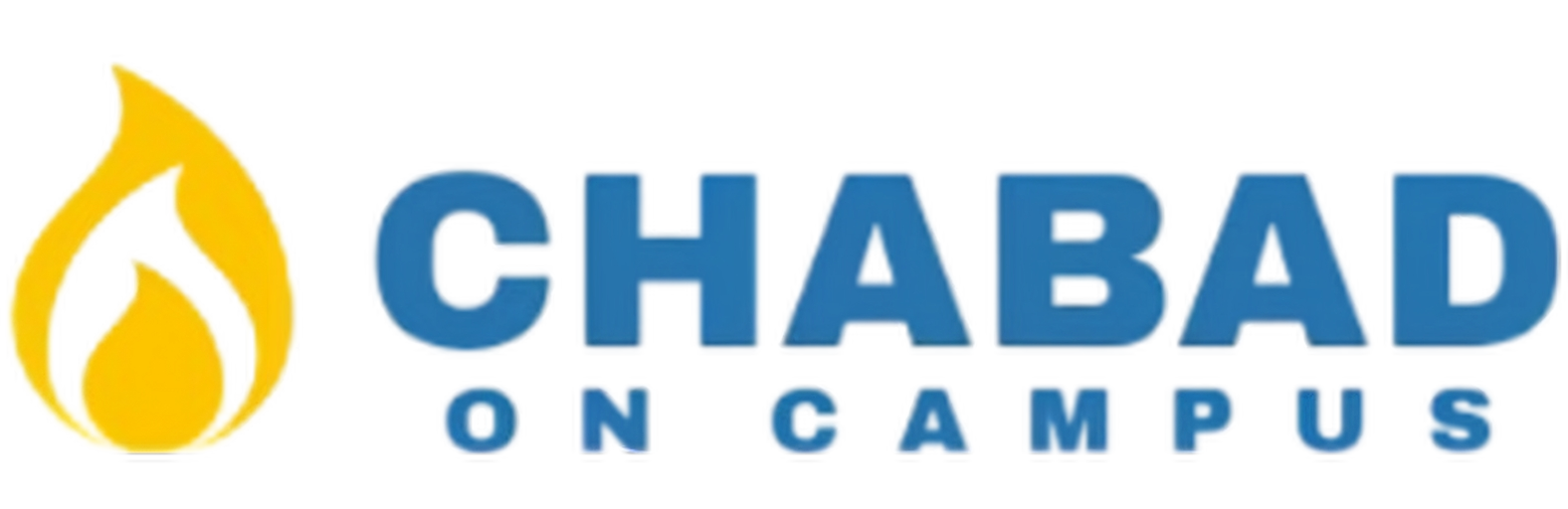
- Formation: 1969
- Founder: Menachem Mendel Schneerson
- Founded at: University of California, Los Angeles
- Type: Nonprofit organization
- Legal status: foundation
- Purpose: Jewish outreach
- Headquarters: 719 Eastern Parkway, Suite 1 Brooklyn, NY 11213
- Region served: global
- Secretary General: Rabbi Eitan Webb
- CEO: Rabbi Yossy Gordon
- President: Rabbi Menachem Schmidt
- Chairman: George Rohr
- Parent organization: Merkos L'Inyonei Chinuch
- Subsidiaries: Chabad Lubavitch
- Website: https://chabadoncampus.org

Chabad on Campus International is a division of Merkos L'Inyonei Chinuch, the educational arm of the Chabad Lubavitch movement. It is the umbrella organization for the Chabad on Campus network one of the largest Jewish organizations serving college campuses, with over 482 permanent branches on North American campuses, and an additional 468 globally.

== Mission ==
The Chabad on Campus International assists local Chabad Student Centers worldwide. This includes logistical support and staff training, as well as centralized programming such as national Shabbatons and student leadership retreats. The foundation provides grants to encourage creative local programming.

== History ==
The first campus Chabad House, UCLA Chabad House, was established under the Lubavitcher Rebbe's direction by Rabbi Shlomo Cunin on the UCLA campus in 1969. Since 2001 the Chabad campus presence has tripled (78 new centers).

In August 2015, Chabad on Campus announced that 19 "emissary couples" would be sent to schools across the United States to open up Jewish cultural centers. Target campuses include "the University of South Carolina, Louisiana State University, the University of Utah, Tulane University, Caltech, and the University of Alabama.” Chabad mentioned increasing anti-semitism as a partial motive for its expansion. Chabad is generally more known for its outreach to non-religious Jews than for pro-Israel activism.

According to a report by Inside Higher Ed, the number of Chabad on Campus centers grew from 36 in 2000 to 258 in 2021. Chabad claims that it serves Jewish students on over 950 colleges internationally.

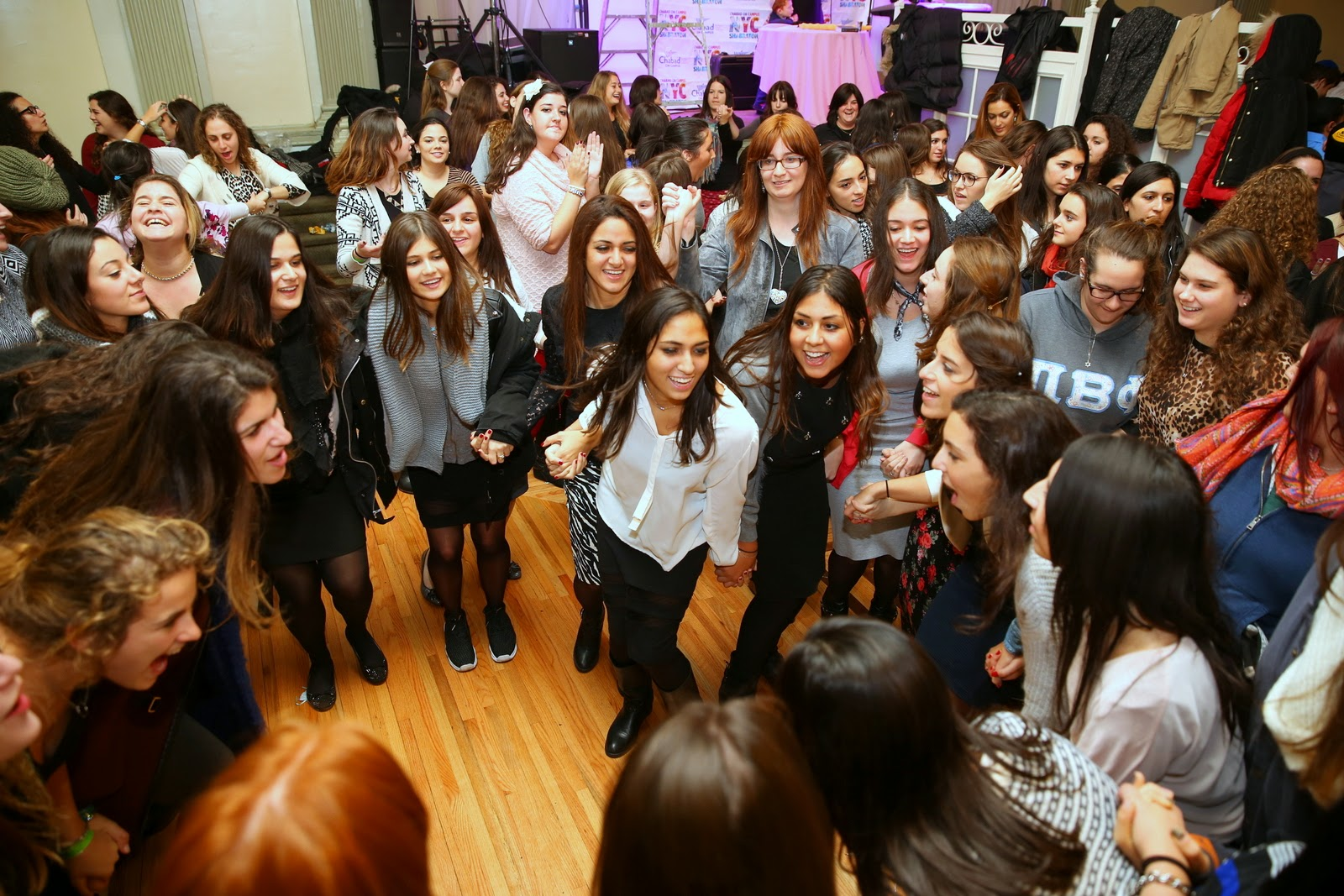
Students dance at the Chabad in Crown Heights, Brooklyn on Campus Shabbaton in 2014.

== See also ==
- Hillel International
- Jewish fundamentalism
- Orthodox Judaism outreach
