= Friendship Circle (organization) =

Jewish nonprofit organization

Friendship Circle International
- Formation: 1994
- Founder: Rabbi Levi Shemtov, Bassie Shemtov
- Founded at: West Bloomfield, Michigan
- Website: https://www.friendshipcircle.com/

Friendship Circle a.k.a. Friendship Circle International is a charity for children and young people with special needs. The organization is run by the Chabad Hasidic movement under the direction of Merkos L'Inyonei Chinuch. The organization pairs Jewish high school student volunteers with children with disabilities. The first Friendship Circle center opened in West Bloomfield Township, Michigan; now there are many chapters across the United States and Canada, and in the United Kingdom.

== Activities ==
Friendship Circle organizes walkathons to raise funds for children with disabilities. Other initiatives include art auctions.

A New Jersey chapter of Friendship Circle opened a "LifeTown" center in Livingston, a multi-faceted center where young people with disabilities can learn life skills in a supportive environment. The center includes therapy and health facilities as well as an aquatics center. LifeTown Shoppes have stores and businesses where young people can learn life skills with the help of volunteers and professional staff. The center provides services to 30,000 young people each year. The center is modeled after a Michigan center.

The Friendship Circle of Pittsburgh was established in 2006 to build a more inclusive community. The Friendship Circle is a community-based program that brings together people of diverse abilities and interests. Members of The Friendship Circle participate in a diverse range of activities and experiences tailored to each age group.

Some Friendship Circle chapters have turned to founding social enterprise programs employing young people with disabilities, such as bakeries and thrift shops.
