= Barry Gurary =

US-based rabbi

Barry Gurary (also: Gourary, Sholom Dovber or Berke) (b. in Rostov-on-Don, Russia February 10, 1923, d. Montclair, New Jersey, United States March 14, 2005) was a rabbi. He was the nephew of Rabbi Menachem Mendel Schneerson, the seventh Lubavitcher rebbe.

== Biography ==
Barry Gurary was the only son of Rabbi Shemaryahu Gurary and the nephew of Rabbi Menachem Mendel Schneerson. He married Mina Haskind.

Gurary's relationship with Schneerson was a source of friction within the family and the Chabad-Lubavitch Hasidic community.

One year after the death of his grandfather, Yosef Yitzchak Schneersohn, Menachem Mendel Schneerson became the seventh rebbe of the movement, while Shemaryahu Gurary, Barry Gurary's father, held the same positions he had in the past.

=== Agudas Chasidei Chabad v. Gourary ===
Gurary's grandfather, Yosef Yitzchak Schneersohn, collected a large library of Jewish texts, which included several hundred rare volumes. Gurary said he was entitled to a portion of the library and was supported in this by his mother and his grandfather's librarian, Rabbi Chaim Lieberman.

In 1984, Gurary entered the library and clandestinely stole many books which he sold to rare book dealers. One illuminated Passover Haggadah from 1757 was sold for $69,000 to a Swiss book dealer who soon found a private buyer to pay nearly $150,000 for it. Gurary was observed on a security camera taking the books.

Gurary said he had his mother's permission and the permission of his aunt, Menachem Mendel Schneerson's wife, to take the books. His aunt denied giving him permission. Schneerson demanded that the volumes be returned. When Gurary refused, also refusing Schneerson's summons to a Beth Din (rabbinical court), Schneerson's legal team sought a temporary restraining order that would impound the books still in Gurary's possession, and a ruling that the library was the property of Agudas Chasidei Chabad, the umbrella organization for the Chasidic movement. Schneerson's legal team included Nathan Lewin, former ambassador Jerome J. Shestack, and future Solicitor General of the United States Seth Waxman.

Schneerson said that the volumes were not the "personal possession" of Gurary's grandfather, but the "communal property" of the Lubavitch Hasidim. This view was supported by a letter from Gurary's grandfather indicating that the books were the heritage of the entire Jewish community.

During the court hearing, Gurary's mother supported him while his father supported Schneerson. Schneerson was not deposed, but his wife, Chaya Mushka Schneerson was. Other witnesses included Nobel Peace Prize recipient Elie Wiesel, who testified as an expert witness on Chasidic life.

On 5 Tevet 5747 (January 6 1986), the court ruled in favor of Agudas Chassidei Chabad, and the ruling was upheld on appeal in 1987. Agudas Chassidei Chabad located and paid the various book collectors who had bought the books from Gurary and the volumes were returned to the library. In total, Agudas Chassidei Chabad paid $432,000 to buy back the various books. Since then, the date of 5 Tevet (or Hei Teves) is celebrated among Chabad Chassids as "Didan Notzach" (Hebrew: דידן נצח, The Victory is ours).

Gurary worked as a management consultant.

== Sources and external links ==
- Chmouel Lubecki: "Didan Notzach"
- Sholom Ber Levin: "Mishpat HaSfarim"
- Moshe Bogomilsky: "The story of Hey Teves"
- Pesach Burston: "Tshura - Hey Teves - South Africa"
- Shaul Shimon Deutsch, Larger than Life
- Avrum M. Ehrlich, Leadership in the HaBaD Movement ISBN 0-7657-6055-X
