= The Shluchim Office =

New York-based organization affiliated with the Chabad-Lubavitch Hasidic movement

- Formation: 1986
- Founder: Menachem Mendel Schneerson
- Director: Rabbi Gedalya Shemtov
- Co-Director: Mrs. Bassie Shemtov
- Shlichus Market & Publications: Rabbi Avraham Green
- Parent organization: Merkos L'Inyonei Chinuch
- Subsidiaries: Nigri International Shluchim Online School Tzeirei Hashluchim Winter Camp Shluchim Gemach Chinuch Yaldei Hashluchim
- Website: https://www.shluchim.org/

The Shluchim Office is a Brooklyn, New York-based organization affiliated with the Chabad-Lubavitch Hasidic movement. The organization was first formed in 1986 upon the request of the Seventh Lubavitcher Rebbe, Rabbi Menachem Mendel Schneerson. The central mission of the organization is to provide support, services and assistance for Chabad Shluchim.

== Programs ==
The Kinus for Young Shluchos is a conference organized by the Shluchim Office, first convened in 1995. The conference is held twice a year, one for boys, one for girls. The dates correspond the men's and women's Shluchim conferences.

The Nigri International Shluchim Online School was established by the Shluchim Office in 2002, designed specifically for the children of Chabad Shluchim who often live in cities and countries where there are no local religious Jewish schools. The school has over 500 students and 50 staff.

The Kushner International Tefillin Bank was established by the Shluchim Office to subsidize pairs of Tefillin for any Jew committed to using them regularly.

== See also ==
- Chabad
