= Yosef Yitzchak Schneersohn =

Sixth Chabad Rebbe (1880–1950)

Rabbi Yosef Yitzchak Schneersohn
- יוסף יצחק שניאורסאהן
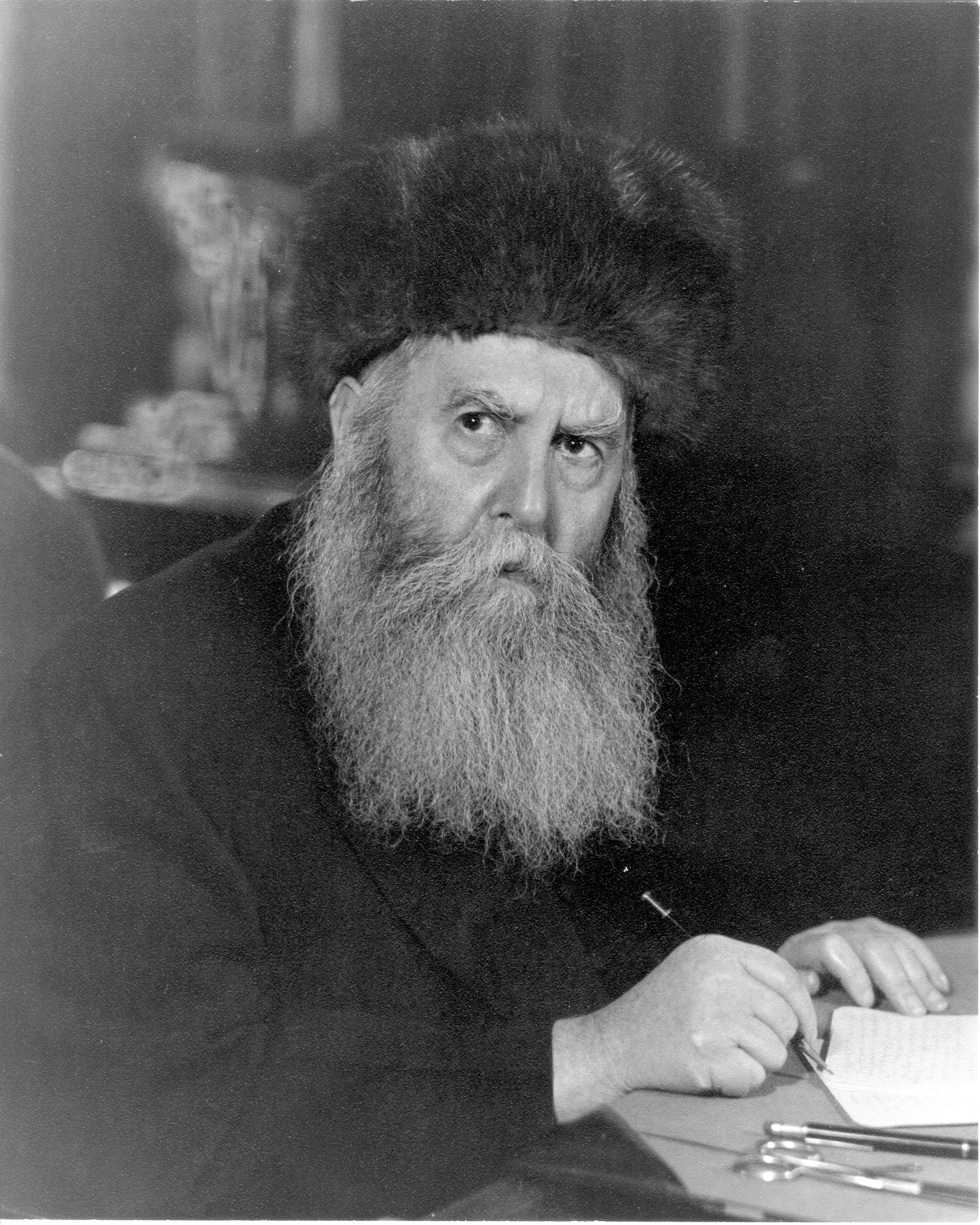
- Title: Frierdiker Rebbe

Personal life
- Born: 21 June 1880 Lyubavichi, Mogilev Governorate, Russian Empire
- Died: 28 January 1950 (aged 69) Brooklyn, New York, U.S.
- Buried: Montefiore Cemetery, Queens, New York, U.S.
- Spouse: Nechama Dina Schneersohn
- Children: Chana; Chaya Mushka
- Parents: Sholom Dovber Schneersohn (father); Shterna Sarah (mother)
- Dynasty: Chabad Lubavitch

Religious life
- Religion: Judaism

Jewish leader
- Predecessor: Sholom Dovber Schneersohn
- Successor: Menachem Mendel Schneerson
- Began: 21 March 1920
- Ended: 28 January 1950
- Yahrtzeit: 10 Shevat 5710
- Dynasty: Chabad Lubavitch

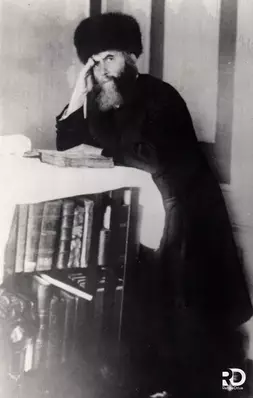
Rabbi Yosef Yitzchak Schneersohn

Yosef Yitzchak (Joseph Isaac) Schneersohn (Yiddish: יוסף יצחק שניאורסאהן; 21 June 1880 – 28 January 1950) was an Orthodox rabbi and the sixth Rebbe (spiritual leader) of the Chabad Lubavitch Hasidic movement. He is also known as the Frierdiker Rebbe (Yiddish for "Previous Rebbe"), the Rebbe RaYYaTz, or the Rebbe Rayatz (an acronym for Rabbi Yosef Yitzchak). After many years of fighting to keep Orthodox Judaism alive from within the Soviet Union, he was forced to leave; he continued to conduct the struggle from Latvia, and then Poland, and eventually the United States, where he spent the last ten years of his life.

== Early life ==
Yosef Yitzchak Schneersohn was born in Lyubavichi, Mogilev Governorate, Russian Empire (present-day Smolensk Oblast, Russia), the only son of Sholom Dovber Schneersohn (the Rebbe Rashab), the fifth Rebbe of Chabad. He was appointed as his father's personal secretary at the age of 15; in that year, he represented his father in the conference of communal leaders in Kovno. The following year (1896), he participated in the Vilna Conference, where rabbis and community leaders discussed issues such as: genuine Jewish education; permission for Jewish children not to attend public school on Shabbat; and the creation of a united Jewish organization for the purpose of strengthening Judaism. He participated in this conference again in 1908.

On 13 Elul 5657 (1897), at the age of 17, he married his second cousin, Nechama Dina Schneersohn, daughter of Rabbi Avraham Schneerson of Chișinău, son of Rabbi Yisroel Noach of Nizhyn, son of Rabbi Menachem Mendel Schneersohn, the Tzemach Tzedek.

In 1898, he was appointed head of the Tomchei Temimim yeshiva network.

In 1901, with financial support from Yaakov and Eliezer Poliakoff he opened spinning and weaving mills in Dubrovno and Mahilyow and established a yeshiva in Bukhara.

As he matured, he campaigned for the rights of Jews by appearing before the Czarist authorities in Saint Petersburg and Moscow. During the Russo-Japanese War of 1904 he sought relief for Jewish conscripts in the Russian army by sending them kosher food and supplies in the Russian Far East. He was also active in efforts to provide matzah for Passover to Jewish soldiers on the Far Eastern front.

With rising antisemitism and pogroms against Jews, in 1906 he traveled with other prominent rabbis to seek help from Western European governments, especially Germany and the Netherlands, and persuaded bankers there to use their influence to stop pogroms.

He was arrested four times between 1902 and 1911 by the Czarist police because of his activism, but was released each time.

Upon the death of his father, Rabbi Sholom Dovber Schneersohn ("Rashab"), in 1920, Schneerson became the sixth Rebbe of Chabad.

== Battling the Bolsheviks ==
Following the Communist takeover of Russia, the Yevsektsiya supported anti-religious activity against Orthodox Jewish institutions and practice. As rebbe of a Russia-based Jewish movement, Schneersohn organized activists and religious institutions to preserve Torah study and Jewish observance, including schools, yeshivas, rabbis, ritual slaughterers, teachers and mikvaot.

In 1921, he established a branch of Tomchei Temimim in Warsaw.

In 1924, he was forced by the Cheka (Russian secret police) to leave Rostov due to the Yevsektsiya's slander, and settled in Leningrad. In this time he labored to strengthen Torah observance through activities involving rabbis, Torah schools for children, yeshivot, shochtim, senior Torah-instructors and the opening of mikva'ot; he established a special committee to help manual workers be able to observe Shabbat. He established Agudas Chasidei Chabad in USA and Canada.

In 1927, he established a number of yeshivot in Bukhara.

He also sent teachers and other representatives to Jewish communities in Russia and supported rabbis and institutions through loans and subsidies.

=== Imprisonment and release ===
In 1927, he was arrested and imprisoned in the Shpalerna or Shpalerka Prison (latter known as Bolshoy Dom) in Leningrad. He was accused of counter-revolutionary activities, and sentenced to death. A worldwide storm of outrage and pressure from Western governments and the International Red Cross forced the communist regime to commute the death sentence and instead on 3 Tammuz it banished him to Kostroma for an original sentence of three years. Yekaterina Peshkova, a prominent Russian human rights activist, helped from inside as well. This was also commuted following political pressure from the outside, and in July 1927, he was finally allowed to leave Russia for Riga in Latvia, where he lived until 1929 before visiting Mandatory Palestine (now Israel).

Yosef Yitzchak's release from Soviet imprisonment is celebrated each year by the Chabad community.

After his release, Yosef Yitzchak went to Mandatory Palestine where he saw holy gravesites, local yeshivas and Torah centers, and met with rabbis and community leaders from 7–22 August 1929. He visited Hebron ten days before the massacre and, according to Chabad accounts, was the first Jew for many years to be allowed into the Cave of the Patriarchs. Little information is available about the effect his visit had on the attitude of the local Arabs.

== 1929: First visit to the United States ==
Following his trip to the Holy Land, he turned his attention to the United States, arriving in Manhattan on 17 September 1929 (12 Elul 5689) on the French passenger liner S.S. France. Schneersohn was greeted by some 600 people, with security provided by over 100 New York City police officers. "May the Almighty bless this great country that has been a refuge for our Jewish people," he said at his arrival. The purpose of his visit was to assess the educational and religious state of American Jewry, and raise awareness of the plight of Soviet Jews. Hailed as "one of the greatest Jews of our age," he was honored at a 28 October banquet in Manhattan by Orthodox, Conservative and Reform Jewish leaders.

While in the United States, Schneersohn also traveled (among places other than New York) to Philadelphia, Baltimore, Detroit, Boston, and Chicago. On 10 July, he met President Herbert Hoover at the White House. As the Republican presidential candidate, Hoover had lobbied for his release. Lubavitch followers in America begged their Rebbe to leave Russia and stay in America, but Schneersohn declined, saying that America was an irreligious place where even rabbis shaved off their beards. He left the United States to return to Riga, Latvia, on 17 July 1930.

From 1934 until the early part of World War II, he lived in Warsaw, Poland.

== 1940: Settling in the United States ==
Following Nazi Germany's attack against Poland in 1939, Schneersohn refused to leave Warsaw. After combined efforts of several secular American Jews, the government of the United States of America, which was still neutral, used its diplomatic relations to convince Nazi Germany to rescue Schneersohn from the war zone in German-occupied Poland. He remained in the city during the bombardments and its capitulation to Nazi Germany. He gave the full support of his organizations to assist as many Jews as possible to flee the invading armies. With the intercession of the United States Department of State in Washington, DC and with the lobbying of many Jewish leaders, such as Jacob Rutstein, on behalf of the Rebbe (and, reputedly, also with the help of Admiral Wilhelm Canaris, the head of the Abwehr), he was finally granted diplomatic immunity and given safe passage to go via Berlin to Riga, Latvia, where the Rebbe was a citizen and which was still free. From Riga, the Rebbe left for America by way of Sweden with his wife, his mother Shterna Sarah, Shemaryahu Gurary, his wife Chana and son Berka, Chaim Mordechai Aizik Hodakov and his wife, and Nissan Mindel. They traveled in a small plane to Sweden since boats were no longer permitted out of Riga, landing in Stockholm, and then took a boat to Gothenburg. There, they boarded the Drottningholm which sailed to America, arriving in New York City on 19 March 1940, and where they stayed at Manhattan's Greystone Hotel. Major Ernst Bloch, a decorated German army officer of Jewish descent, was put in command of a group which included Sgt. Klaus Schenk, a half-Jew and Pvt. Johannes Hamburger, a quarter-Jew assigned to locate the Rebbe in Poland and escort him safely to freedom. They wound up saving not only the Rebbe, but also over a dozen Hasidic Jews in the Rebbe's family or associated with him.

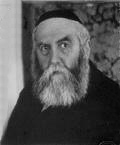
Rabbi Yosef Yitzchak Schneersohn Passport Picture (1933)

Working with the government and the contacts Schneersohn had with the US State Department, Chabad was able to save his son-in-law (and future successor) Menachem Mendel Schneerson from Vichy France in 1941 before the borders were closed down. When Schneersohn came to America (he was the first major Chasidic leader to move permanently to the United States) two of his chassidim came to him, and said not to start up all the activities in which Lubavitch had engaged in Europe, because "America is different." To avoid disappointment, they advised him not even to try. Schneersohn wrote, "Out of my eyes came boiling tears", and undeterred, the next day he started the first Lubavitcher Yeshiva in America, declaring that "America is no different." In 1949, Schneersohn became a U.S. citizen.

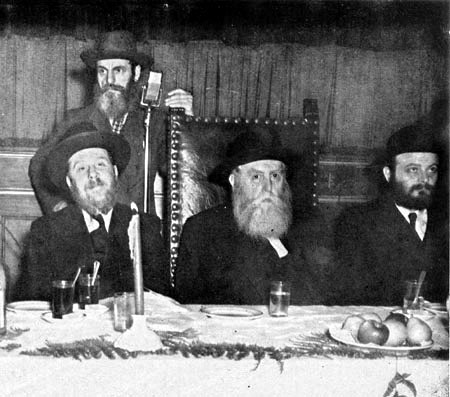
Left to right: Shemaryahu Gurary, Yosef Yitzhak Schneersohn, and Menachem Mendel Schneerson (1943)

Following Schneerson's escape from Nazi occupied Poland and his settlement in New York City, he issued a call for repentance, stating L'alter l'tshuva, l'alter l'geula ("speedy repentance brings a speedy redemption"). This campaign was opposed by rabbis Avraham Kalmanowitz and Aaron Kotler of the Vaad Hatzalah. In return, Schneersohn was critical of the efforts of rabbis Kalmanowitz and Kotler based on the suspicion that Kalmanowitz and Kotler were discriminating in their use of funds, placing their yeshivas before all else, and that the Mizrachi and Agudas Harabonim withdrew their support of the Vaad after they discovered this fact.

== Launch of Lubavitch activities in the United States ==
During the last decade of Rabbi Schneersohn's life, from 1940 to 1950, he settled in the Crown Heights section of Brooklyn in New York City. Rabbi Schneersohn was already physically weak and ill from his suffering at the hands of the Communists and the Nazis and from multiple health issues including multiple sclerosis, but he had a strong vision of rebuilding Orthodox Judaism in America, and he wanted his movement to spearhead it. In New York, he established or expanded Chabad educational, welfare and publishing institutions, including Central Tomchei Temimim, Machne Israel, Kehot Publication Society, Merkos L'Inyonei Chinuch and girls' schools under the names Beis Rivkah and Beis Sarah.

He began to teach publicly, and many came to seek out his teachings. In the United States, he established branches of Tomchei Temimim in Canada and Achei Temimim yeshiva programs in several American towns.

In 1948, he established a Lubavitch village in the Land of Israel known as Kfar Chabad near Tel Aviv, on the site of the de-populated Arab village of Al-Safiriyya.

He died in 1950, and was buried at Montefiore Cemetery in Queens, New York City. He had no sons, and his younger son-in-law, Rabbi Menachem Mendel Schneerson ("The Rebbe") succeeded him as Lubavitcher Rebbe, while the older son-in-law, Rabbi Shemaryahu Gurary continued to run the Chabad Yeshiva network Tomchei Temimim.

After Rabbi Schneersohn's passing, his gravesite, known as "the Ohel", became a regular destination for his successor Rabbi Menachem Mendel Schneerson, who frequently visited the site and read requests brought by followers there.

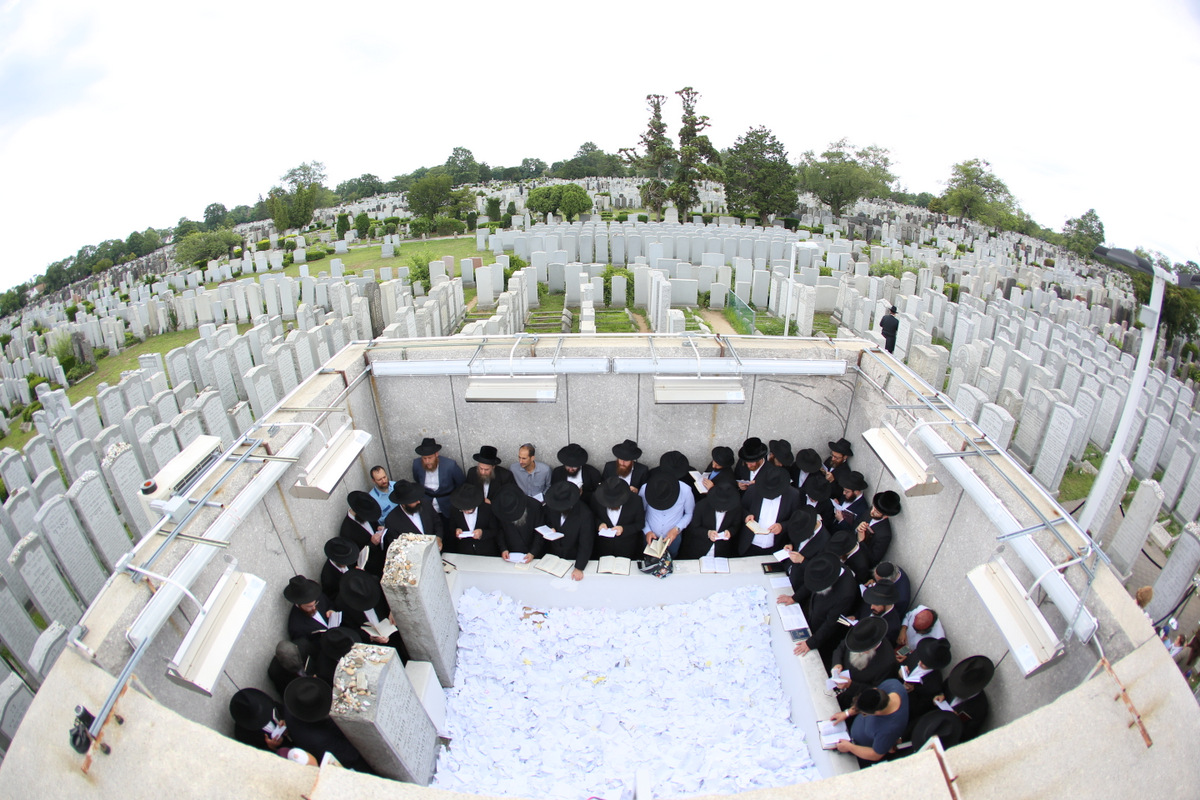
Visitors to Rabbi Yosef Yitzchak Schneersohn Gravesite

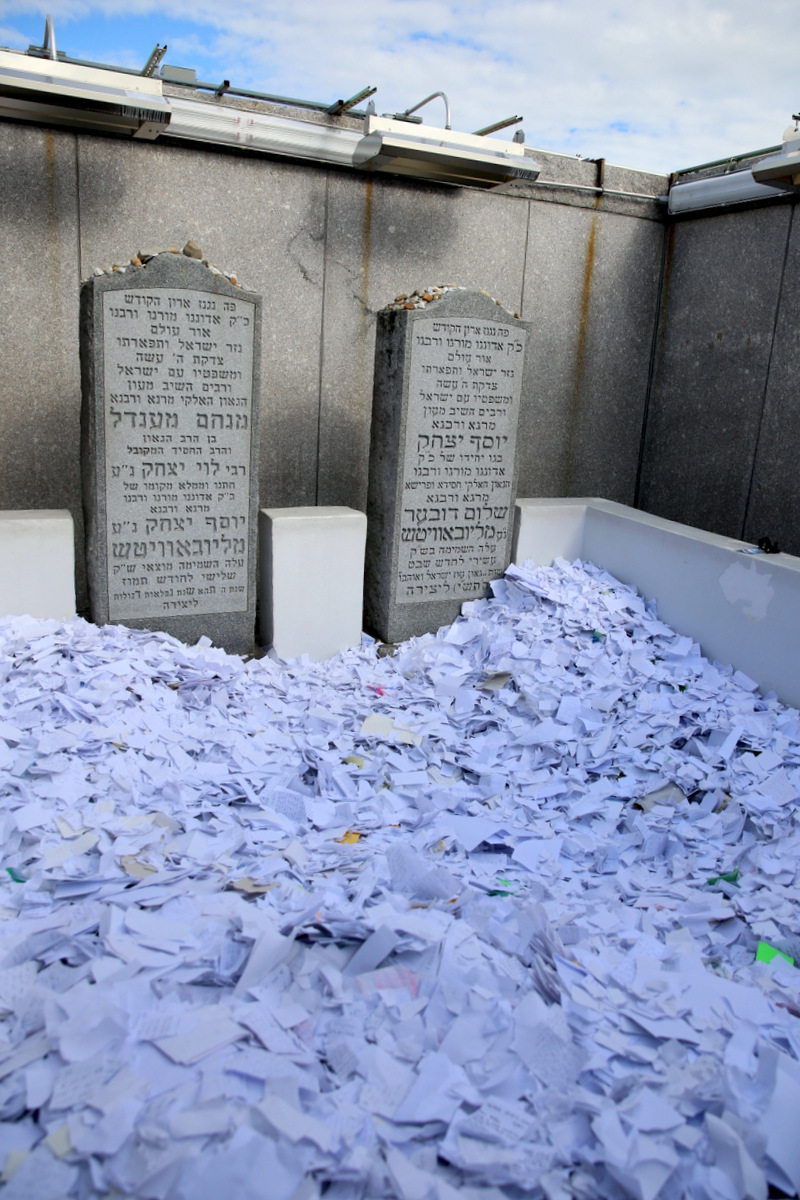
Letters left at gravesite

The Ohel Chabad-Lubavitch Center, located adjacent to the Ohel, was established by philanthropist Joseph Gutnick of Melbourne, Australia.

== Book collection ==
During his life in Smolensk, Rabbi Schneersohn set up a collection of his family's religious books and writings. It includes texts dating back to the 16th century. After World War I, the Bolsheviks found part of the collection and moved it to the Russian State Library. Another part of the collection was confiscated by Soviet troops in Nazi Germany during World War II and moved to Russia's military archive. In 1994, seven books were loaned to the U.S. Library of Congress for 60 days through an inter-library exchange program.

The books were given to the Chabad-Lubavitch library which helped to prolong the use of the books twice, in 1995 and 1996, before they finally refused to return them to Russia in 2000. They proposed an exchange for the opportunity to keep the books indefinitely, but Russia refused. In 2004, the Chabad-Lubavitch filed a lawsuit against Russia, claiming the remaining books. In 2010, a U.S. federal judge ordered Russia to return the library to Agudas Chasidei Chabad of the United States. Russia continued to hold the collection; in 2013, a U.S. judge imposed a $50,000-per-day fine for failing to return it. In retaliation, in 2011 Russia put a ban on lending works to American museums. Since Rabbi Schneersohn had no heirs, Russia claims the collection is a national treasure of the Russian people. This dispute is related to the deteriorating ties between Moscow and the U.S. over the ongoing 2014 Russian military intervention in Ukraine. A Russian court ruled that the Library of Congress should pay fines of $50,000 a day for refusing to return the books.

== Published works ==
=== Hebrew and Yiddish ===
- Sefer Hamaamarim – 5680–5689, 8 vol.
- Sefer Hamaamarim – 5692–5693.
- Sefer Hamaamarim – 5696–5711, 15 vol.
- Sefer Hamaamarim – Kuntresim, 3 vol.
- Sefer Hamaamarim – Yiddish
- Sefer Hasichot – 5680–5691, 2 vol.
- Sefer Hasichot – 5696–5710, 8 vol.
- Likkutei Dibburim, 4 vol.
- Kuntres Torat Hachasidut
- Kuntres Limud Hachasidut
- Admur Hatzemach Tzedek U'Tenuat Hahaskalah
- Kitzurim L'Biurei Hazohar
- Sefer Hakitzurim – Shaarei Orah
- Kitzurim L'Kuntres Hatefillah
- Sefer Hazichronot, 2 vol.
- Moreh Shiur B'Limudei Yom Yom – Chumash, Tehillim, Tanya
- Seder Haselichot
- Maamar V'Ha'ish Moshe Anav, 5698
- Igrot Kodesh, 14 vol.
- Klalei Chinuch veHaDracha

=== Hebrew translations ===
- Likkutei Dibburim, 5 vol.
- Sefer Hasichot – 5700–5705, 3 vol.
- Sefer Hazichronot, 2 vol.

=== English translations ===
- Lubavitcher Rabbi's Memoirs, 3 vol.
- The Tzemach Tzedek and the Haskala Movement
- On Learning Chasidut
- On the Teachings of Chasidut
- Some Aspects of Chabad Chasidism
- Chasidic Discourses, 2 vol.
- Likkutei Dibburim, 6 vol.
- The Principles of Education and Guidance
- The Heroic Struggle
- The Four Worlds
- Creation and Redemption
- The Majestic Bride
- Oneness in Creation
- Touching a City's Soul
- Defiance and Devotion

=== CD/video ===
- America Is No Different

== Literature ==
- Rachel Altein: Out of the Inferno. The efforts that led to the rescue of Rabbi Yosef Yitzchak Schneersohn von Lubavitch from war-torn Europe in 1939–1940, New York 2002, 336 p, ISBN 0-8266-0683-0
- Bryan Mark Rigg: Rescued from the Reich. How One of Hitler's Soldiers Saved the Lubavitcher Rebbe. Yale University Press 2006.

== In film ==
Rabbi Yosef Yitzchak's escape from Poland was the subject of a 2011 Israeli documentary film Ha'rabi Ve'hakatzin Ha'germani (The Chabad Rebbe and the German Officer).

== See also ==
- 770 Eastern Parkway

== Notes and references ==
Religious titles
Preceded by Sholom Dovber Schneersohn	Rebbe of Lubavitch; 1920–1950	Succeeded by Menachem Mendel Schneerson
