= Merkos L'Inyonei Chinuch =

Jewish charity organization network

- Formation: 1943
- Founder: Rabbi Yosef Yitzchak Schneersohn
- Purpose: Education
- Headquarters: Brooklyn, New York
- Chairman: Yehuda Krinsky

Merkos L'Inyonei Chinuch (Hebrew: מרכז לענייני חינוך Mēr Kūz Lĕ Īn Yān Nē Ḥin Ōōḵ lit. Central Organization for Education) is the central educational arm of the Chabad-Lubavitch movement. It was founded in 1943 by the sixth Rebbe, Rabbi Yosef Yitzchok Schneersohn, who served as president, and appointed his son-in-law, Rabbi Menachem Mendel Schneerson, who would later become the seventh Rebbe, as its chairman and director. After the death of Rabbi Yosef Yitzchok Schneersohn, Rabbi Menachem Mendel Schneerson succeeded him as president. Today, Rabbi Chaim Yehuda Krinsky serves as chairman and, until his death in 2024, Rabbi Moshe Kotlarsky A"H served as vice-chairman.

Merkos L'Inyonei Chinuch is the official body responsible for establishing Chabad centers across the globe. Its vice-chairman Rabbi Moshe Kotlarsky oversaw the global network of Shluchim (emissaries), and directed the annual international conference of Chabad emissaries. Following his father's death in 2024, Rabbi Mendy Kotlarsky, executive director of Merkos 302, succeeded him at the helm of the International Conference of Shluchim.

== Organizational structure ==
Merkos L'Inyonei Chinuch has many sub-organizations:

Organization	Description
Central Chabad Lubavitch Library	Home to 250,000 books mostly in Hebrew and Yiddish and over 100,000 letters, artifacts and pictures Its director is Rabbi Shalom Dovber Levine. Housed in Chabad world headquarters at 770 Eastern Parkway in Brooklyn, NY.
Kehot Publication Society	The publishing arm of Chabad as a whole. Established in 1942, It has produced more than 100 million volumes in a dozen languages
Chabad.org	Online repository of Jewish knowledge and information that attracts 50 million visitors yearly. One of the first Jewish websites on the early internet.
The Shluchim Office	Coordination organization that oversees Chabad's worldwide shaliach program. Founded by the Rebbe in 1986
Jewish Educational Media	Video archive of the Lubavitcher Rebbe as well as the broadcast and film production division of the Lubavitch movement, founded in 1980
Jewish Learning Institute	JLI is Chabad’s adult-education arm, offering engaging Jewish-learning courses and lectures in over 1,000 communities worldwide.
Jewish Learning Network	An adult education program begun in 2005
Merkos 302	Program development to support Shluchim and their communities, such as CKids and MyShliach. Merkos 302 also provides leadership training and workshops for emissaries new to directing CTeen chapters around the world, as well as incubating programs like Chabad Young Ambassadors, a global network of activists seeking to grow their local Jewish young-adult communities. Rabbi Mendy Kotlarsky serves as executive director.
CTeen	is the teen-focused arm of the Chabad movement and has 100,000 members worldwide. Its president is Rabbi Mendy Kotlarsky who also serves as the executive director of Merkos Suite 302, which launched CTeen in 2010. As of mid-2023, CTeen had 700 operating chapters all around the world in cities as diverse as France, Rio de Janeiro, Leeds, Munich, Buenos Aires and New York.
National Committee for the Furtherance of Jewish Education	is a charity that educates Jewish children in the United States. It was founded in 1940 by Rabbi Yosef Yitzchak Schneerson.
Chinuch Office	A guidance, training and service center for administrators, educators, students and parents of Chabad-Lubavitch educational institutions
The National Campus Office	Coordinator of Chabad on Campus, a network of Jewish Student Centers on more than 230 university campuses worldwide (as of April 2016), as well as regional Chabad-Lubavitch centers at an additional 150 universities worldwide
Reshet Oholei Yosef Yitzchok	The national education network of Chabad in Israel.
Chabad Young Professionals International	A global network for young Jewish adults offering community and programming.
Aleph Institute	an American non-profit organization affiliated with the Chabad-Lubavitch movement that provides support services to the approximately 85,000 Jews in the U.S. prison system.
Friendship Circle	A charity for children and young people with special needs. The organization pairs Jewish high school student volunteers with children with special needs.
Roving Rabbis	A branch which dispatches pairs of young Chabad rabbinical students, colloquially known as Roving Rabbis, to small and isolated Jewish communities around the world.
