= Tzivos Hashem =

Jewish outreach organization

- Formation: April 15, 1980
- Headquarters: Brooklyn, New York
- Executive Director: Rabbi Yerachmiel Benjaminson
- Program Director: Rabbi Shimmy Weinbaum
- Website: https://www.tzivoshashem.org

Tzivos Hashem (Hebrew: 'צבאות ה Tzi vōt Ha Shem lit. 'Army of God') is an organization based in Brooklyn, New York, that was founded in 1980 as a youth group within the Chabad-Lubavitch movement. Its mission is to promote Jewish customs and practices among non-Orthodox and Orthodox Jewish children

== History ==
On May 22, 1976 (Shabbat Mevarchim Iyar 5736) the Lubavitcher Rebbe established the campaign of Jewish Education (Mivtza Chinuch), an international initiative focused primarily on children's education. Throughout the summer of 1976 (5736) and the following year, followers worldwide engaged in the initiative, visiting hundreds of schools and homes, thereby reaching tens of thousands of children.

During this period, the Rebbe selected established the 12 verses and began holding periodic rallies for children where they would recite the 12 verses. A few years later, on April 15, 1980 (29 Nisan 5740), the Lubavitcher Rebbe announced a new campaign for children. The Rebbe outlined a program that began with preparations for Pesach, which was only two weeks away. This program included the notable "matzah ball contest," reaching over fifty thousand children, and continued with Lag B’Omer, which featured the largest parade to date, attracting over twenty thousand participants. Before Shavuos that year, the Lubavitcher Rebbe announced an initiative for every child to be present in synagogue for the reading of the Ten Commandments, and during the summer, rallies were frequently held.

Today Tzivos Hashem serves primarily Orthodox Jewish children and has established a prominent presence in many schools worldwide.

== Programs ==
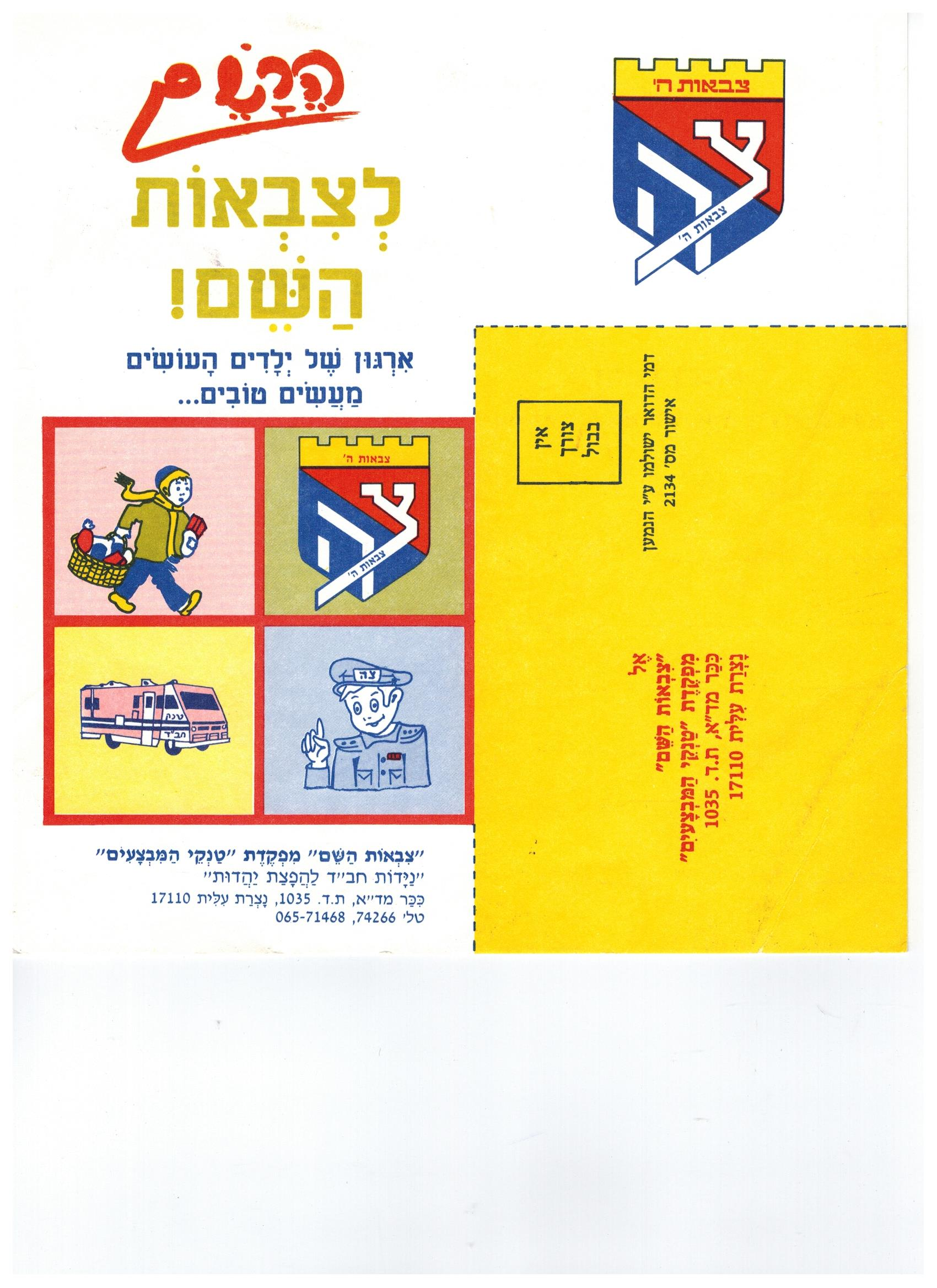
A registration card for the activities of Tzivos Hashem by Chabad mobility in its early years

Tzivos Hashem organizes structured missions and monthly rallies aimed at engaging children in Jewish education and practices. In the "missions" program, participants complete tasks that encourage positive actions, such as charity, prayer, and acts of kindness, often aligned with Jewish values.

Each mission is designed to help participants earn points, medals, and promotions in rank within the organization's structured hierarchy, which parallels military ranks, beginning at "Private" and advancing to ranks such as "Sergeant" and "General." Points and achievements are recorded, and children are recognized for their progress. The highest rank is "Five Star General".

Tzivos Hashem's monthly rallies, also known as "Chayolei Tzivos Hashem" gatherings, function as a communal platform for children enrolled in the program to celebrate their achievements. Each rally typically includes a variety of activities tailored to Jewish holidays, special dates, and educational themes, aiming to reinforce Jewish values through interactive experiences. Children are recognized for their completion of “missions” and are awarded prizes for their efforts. These gatherings may include songs, storytelling, and video segments, which engage children in learning and underscore the values promoted within the program.

Tzivos Hashem has been active in various humanitarian initiatives, particularly focusing on the welfare of Jewish children. The organization operates orphanages in Ukraine and provides support through medical clinics, food pantries, and other services aimed at enhancing the quality of life for children in need. Specifically, Tzivos Hashem runs food pantries that serve around 800 people monthly and offers winter clothing and summer camp subsidies through its Jewish Children's Fund

== Publications ==
Tzivos Hashem publishes three main children's magazines: Moshiach Times, HaChayol, and Tzivos Hashem KIDS!. Each serves different segments of the Jewish youth community. HaChayol is particularly focused on children within the Chabad community, providing content that supports Chabad traditions and values. Tzivos Hashem KIDS! is distributed widely to Chabad Houses globally and is intended for a broader audience. The Moshiach Times magazine, which has a wider readership, is known for engaging features, including illustrations from Al Jaffee, David Berg and Joe Kubert
