= Shaliah =

Jewish legal emissary or agent

In Jewish law, a shaliaḥ (Hebrew: שָלִיחַ, [ʃaˈliaχ]; pl. שְלִיחִים, sheliḥim [ʃliˈχim] or sheliah, literally "emissary" or "messenger") is a legal agent. In practice, "the shaliaḥ for a person is as this person himself." Accordingly, a shaliaḥ performs an act of legal significance for the benefit of the sender, as opposed to him- or herself.

The term, in contemporary usage, has come to refer more generally to a representative or emissary.

== Terminology ==
The legal agent is referred to by the terms שָלִיחַ (shaliach) and שׇׁלוּחַ (shaluach), both of which mean "one who is sent". The person whom the agent is representing is known as the meshaleach (מְשַׁלֵּחַ) or as the sholeach (שׁוֹלֵחַ), both of which mean "one who is sending". The concept of agency overall or the status of being a shaliach is known as shlichut (שְׁלִיחוּת).

== Biblical sources ==
The term does not occur in the Bible as a noun, though the verb lishloach ("to send") is frequently used to describe sending a messenger or agent.

The first shaliaḥ inferred in the Bible is the servant in Genesis 24 who was sent by Abraham to find a wife for Isaac (according to the rabbis, this servant was named Eliezer).

== In halakha ==
The Talmud learns from Numbers 18:28 that any Jewish male or female may appoint an agent, as can servants and maidservants working under a Jew's care. A shaliaḥ however, may only be appointed for a mitzvah or other halakhic Jewish legal affairs that he or she is obligated in.

Mitzvot that are performed on one's own body, such as wearing tefillin, cannot be performed on one's own behalf by a shaliah.

Many of the halakhic Jewish legal affairs that may be performed through a shaliah:

- A man may appoint a shaliah to betroth a woman on his behalf. A woman may choose to accept betrothal through a shaliah.
- A husband may appoint a shaliah to deliver a get to his wife. A wife may choose to appoint a shaliah to receive it.
- A salesman may appoint a shaliah to purchase or sell merchandise on his or her behalf. Similarly, any act of legal acquisition or transfer of ownership may be effected by a shaliah, such as giving a gift or acquiring a found object.
- A person may appoint a shaliah to separate terumot and maaserot on his behalf.
- One who assists in the performance of the rite of Jewish circumcision by holding the child upon his knees is called a shaliah or godfather.
- One who in a measure takes the place of the father, interesting himself in the child's welfare is called a shaliah.

== See also ==
- Apostle
- Power of attorney
