= History of the Jews in Mumbai =

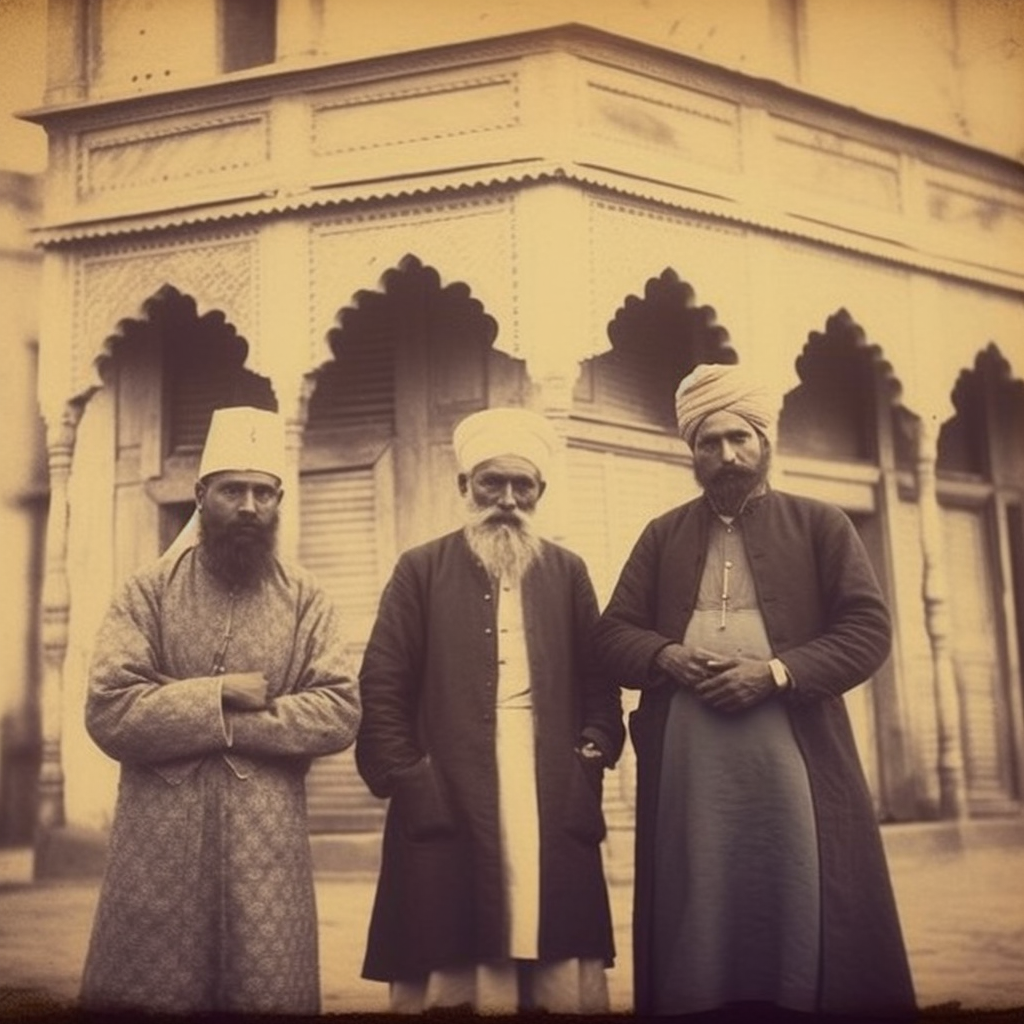
Jews in Mumbai

Notable synagogues in Mumbai

The history of the Jews in Mumbai (previously known as Bombay), India, began when Jews started settling in Bombay during the first century, due to its economic opportunities. The Jewish community of Bombay consisted of the remnants of three distinct communities: the Bene Israeli Jews of Konkan, the Baghdadi Jews of Iraq, and the Cochin Jews of Malabar.

Bombay is home to the majority of India's rapidly dwindling Jewish population. At its peak, in the late 1940s, the Jewish population of Bombay reached nearly 30,000.

== Arrival in Bombay ==
The first Baghdadi Jew, Joseph Semah, moved to Bombay from Surat in 1730 and the first member of the Bene Israel community to move from the Konkan villages south of Bombay to the city arrived in 1746 part of the Divekar family. In 1796 Samuel Ezekiel Divekar (1730–1797) established "The Gate of Mercy" synagogue.

== Present population ==
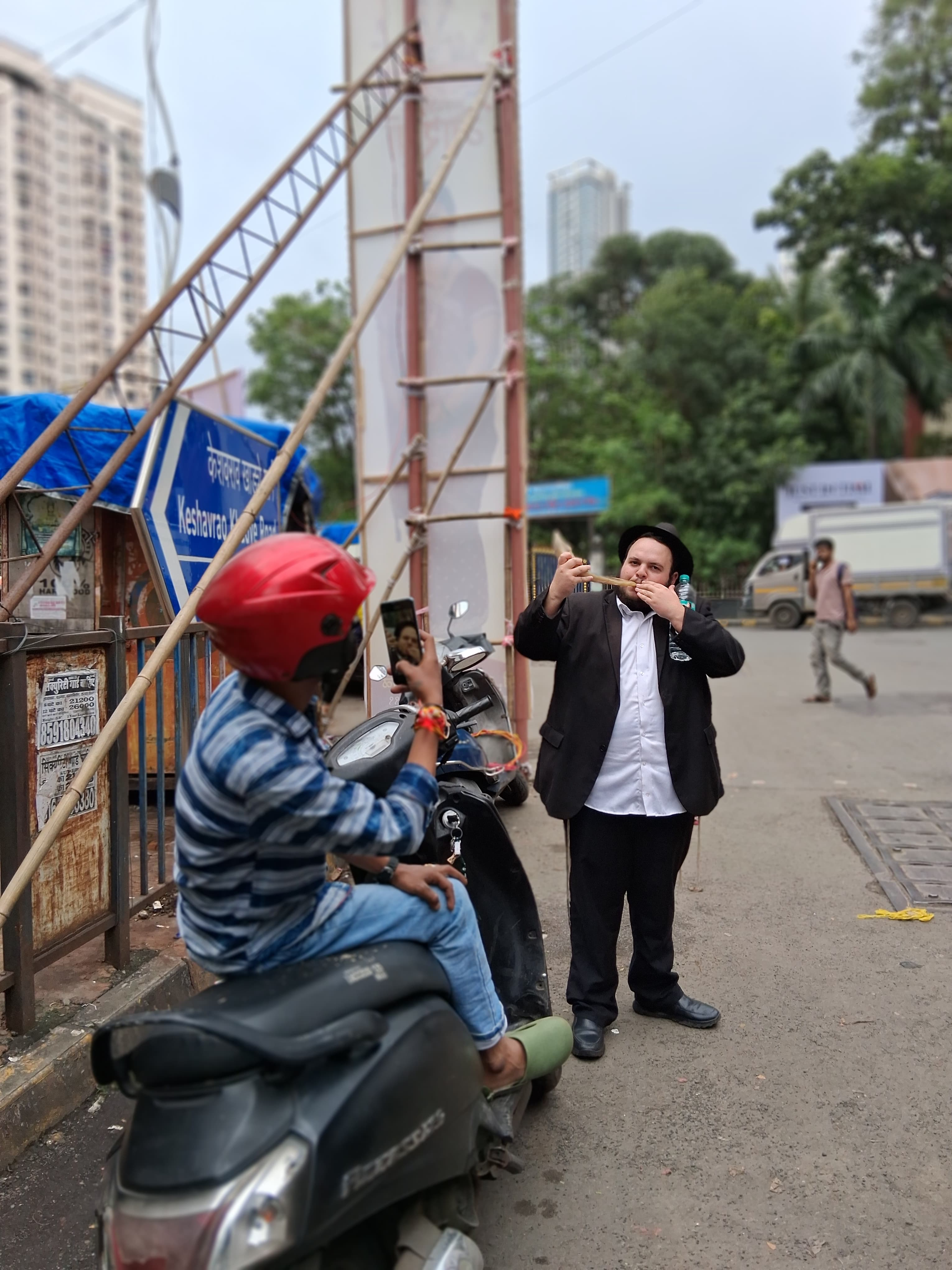
A Chabad emissary blowing a shofar on a street in Mumbai, 2026

Less than 4,000 Jews live in Mumbai, formerly known as Bombay, and there are eight synagogues in the city. Today, the majority of Mumbai's Jews reside in Israel.

== Activities ==
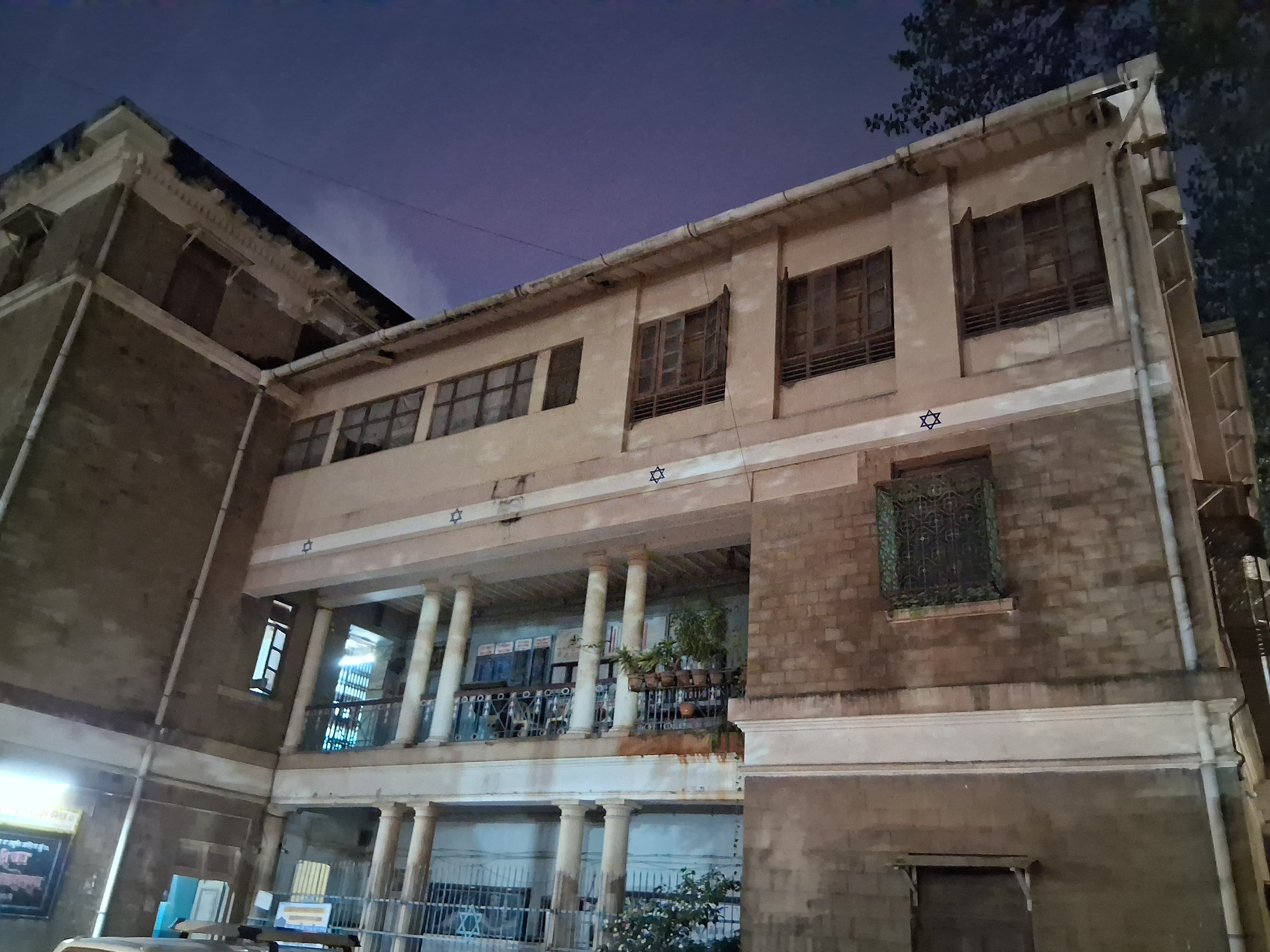
A building that once served as the Mumbai Jewish School

The American Jewish Joint Distribution Committee runs a Jewish Community Center and has 500 members with classes on Hebrew and Judaism, holiday parties, youth discos and clubs for children and seniors. Also, there is an "ORT" (Organization for educational Resources and Technological training), an international Jewish organization with the mandate of helping impoverished Jews and which sells kosher wine, challah, chicken and baked goods.

Also, started in 2004 is the Hazon Eli Foundation for Jewish Life in India, based in Thane (a suburb of Mumbai where many younger Jewish families are moving to), to teach Torah, Hebrew and Jewish law to the suburban population. A Sunday school is run there for children under 13, which attracts about 25 students weekly.

In Mumbai, there is also the Jewish founded "Sir Jacob Sassoon High School" and Sir Elly Kadoorie High School Today there are only a handful of Jewish students left, but they once had Hebrew and Torah classes.

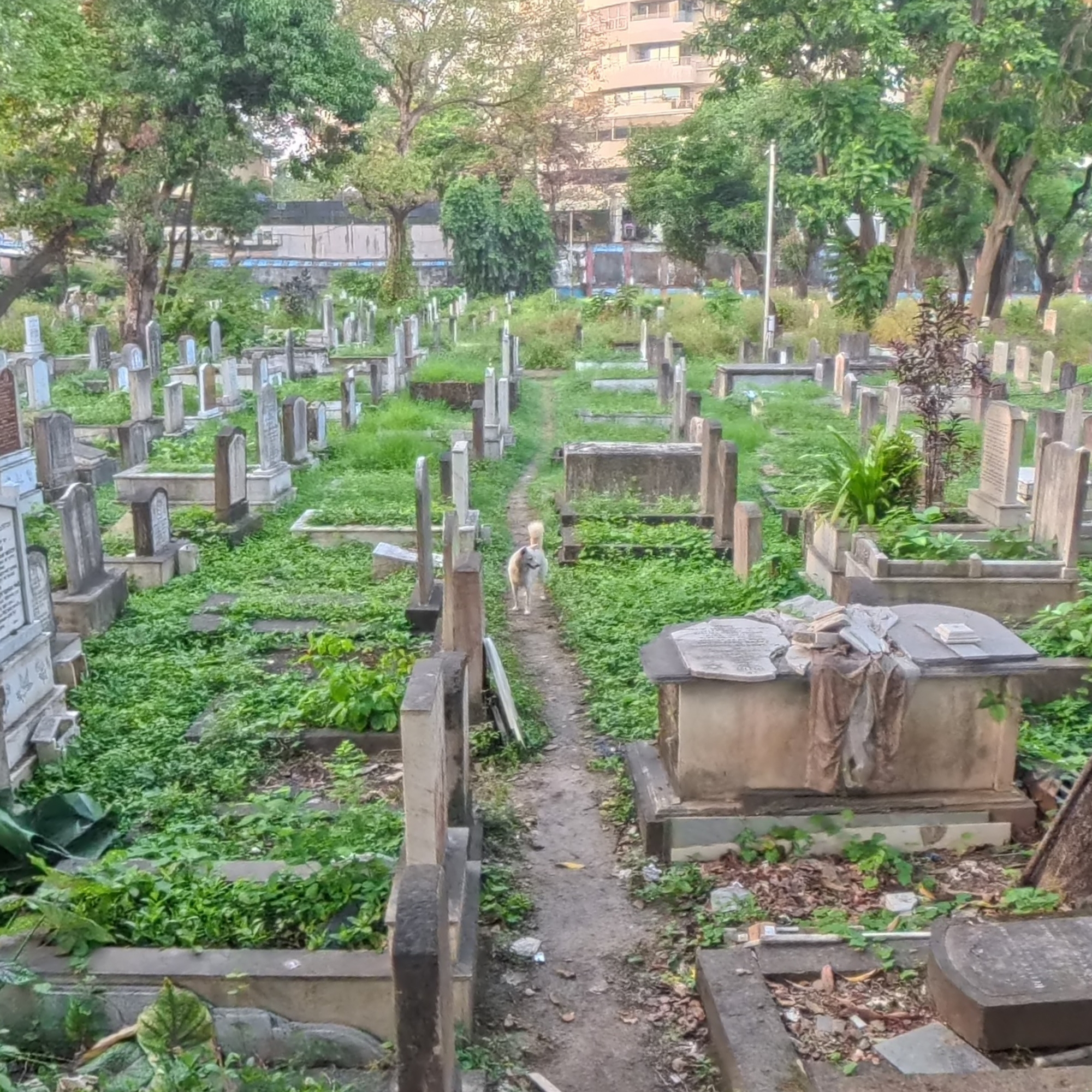
Mumbai Jewish Cemetery

== Terrorist attacks on Mumbai ==
Until the 2008 Mumbai attacks the Mumbai Chabad House Jewish outreach center was at Nariman House, Hormusji Street. In the attack, six Jews were held hostage and murdered at the center, the 29-year-old Rabbi Gavriel Holtzberg, his 28-year-old wife, Rivka, Rabbi Aryeh Leibish Teitelbaum (37), Bentzion Chroman (28), Yocheved Orpaz (62) and Norma Shvarzblat-Rabinovich (50). The parents of Rivka Holtzberg have announced their intention to continue Chabad's emissary work in Mumbai, although the Chabad House may move to a new location in the city mostly in South Mumbai near Worli.

== Communal relations ==
Mumbai Jews' ties with their city's Muslim community have historically been strong and remain so after the Mumbai attacks. The two groups have been drawn together as minorities in a Hindu-dominated land – even by the similarities of their non-vegetarian diets of Kosher and Halal foods. "For these reasons, most Bene synagogues in Mumbai are in Muslim areas," Jonathan Solomon, chairman of the Indian Jewish Federation, said. Mumbai's Muslim Council had ordered that the nine gunmen killed should not be buried in the city, a gesture which was highly appreciated by the Mumbai Jewish community.

== Bibliography ==
Tigay, Alan M. (1994). The Jewish Traveler: Hadassah Magazine's Guide to the World's Jewish Communities and Sights. Rowman & Littlefield. ISBN 9781568210780.
