= Haim Biton =

Israeli politician

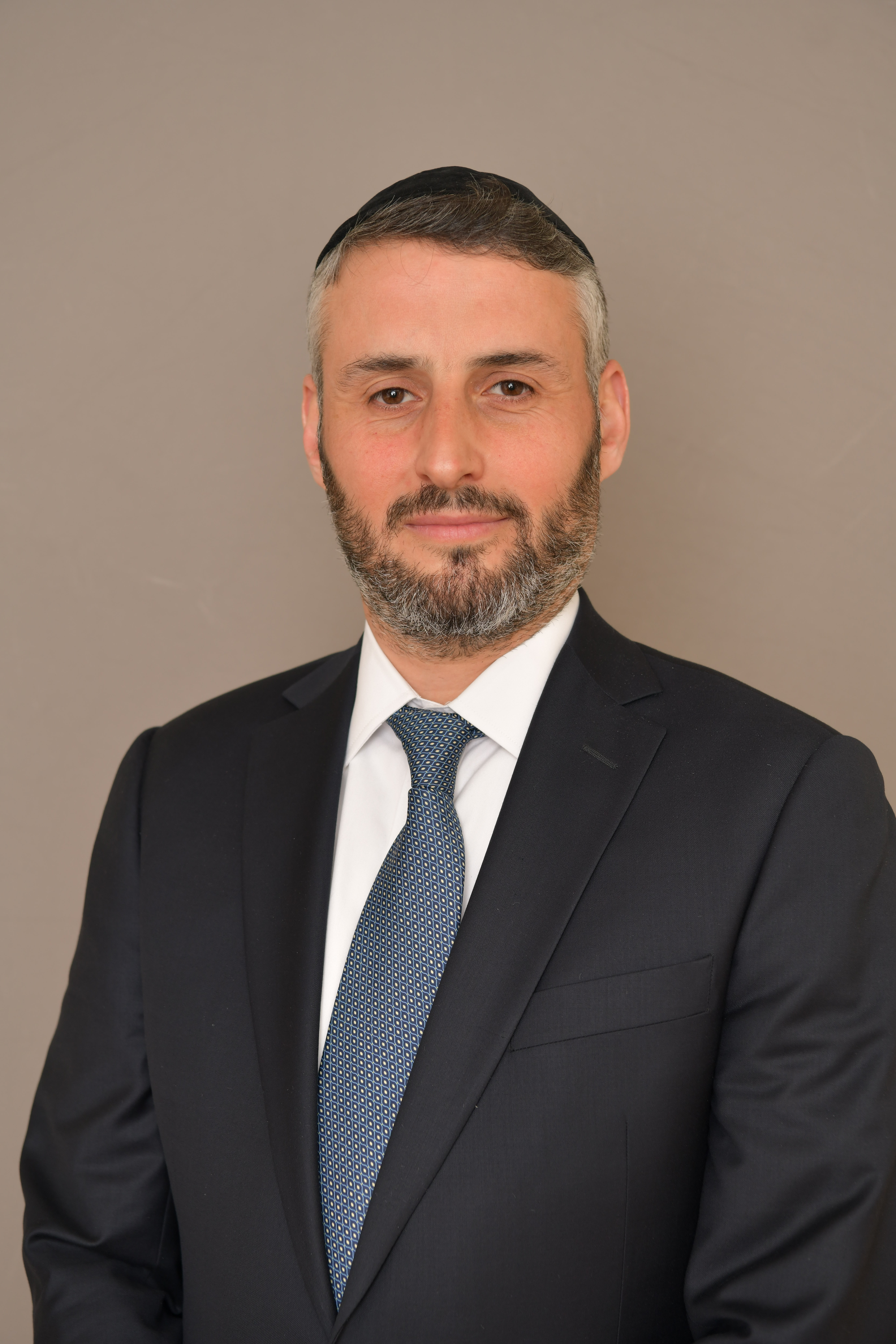
- Biton in 2023

Ministerial roles
- 2022–2025: Minister in the Ministry of Education

Faction represented in the Knesset
- 2021–: Shas

Personal details
- Born: 17 January 1978 (age 48) Jerusalem, Israel

Haim Biton (Hebrew: חַיִּים בִּיטוֹן; born 17 January 1978) is an Israeli politician. He is currently a member of the Knesset for Shas. Biton also served as a minister in the Ministry of Education.

== Biography ==
Biton began his public career at age 20 as an assistant deputy director of the El HaMaayan educational network. In 2001 he was appointed deputy CEO of the Migdal Or network, headed by Rabbi Yitzchak David Grossman, and served as its CEO from 2003 to 2014. During the same period, he was also a member of the Migdal HaEmek city council.

Biton was appointed CEO of Shas in 2014. In 2016 he took over the party's Ma'ayan Hinukh Torani school system, increasing its enrollment by 10,000 in two years. Following a complaint by Hiddush, in 2020 the Office of the Attorney General ruled that he could not be both CEO of the party and the school network.

Biton was placed ninth on the Shas list for the 2015 elections. The party won only seven seats, and when he had the opportunity to take his seat as a replacement, he declined, allowing Yigal Guetta to take his place. He subsequently turned down the opportunity to run on the party's list for the April 2019 Knesset elections. However, prior to the 2021 elections he was placed fifth on the Shas list, and was elected to the Knesset as the party won nine seats.

Biton served as a minister in the Education Ministry until his resignation in July 2025.

Biton lives in Giv'at Ze'ev, an Israeli settlement located north of Jerusalem.
