= Chabad (disambiguation) =

Chabad or Chabad-Lubavitch is a major branch of Hasidic Judaism.

Chabad may also refer to:

- Motke Chabad (19th century), Jewish Lithuanian jester from Vilnius
- Kfar Chabad, literally Chabad village, a Chabad-Lubavitch community near Tel Aviv, Israel
- Shikun Chabad, literally Chabad housing, Hasidic Jewish neighborhood in northern Jerusalem
- "Chabad" is a colloquial reference to any individual Chabad house, e.g., from the list of Chabad houses in California
