= Knesset Eliyahoo Synagogue =

Synagogue in Mumbai, India

- Hebrew: בית הכנסת אליהו
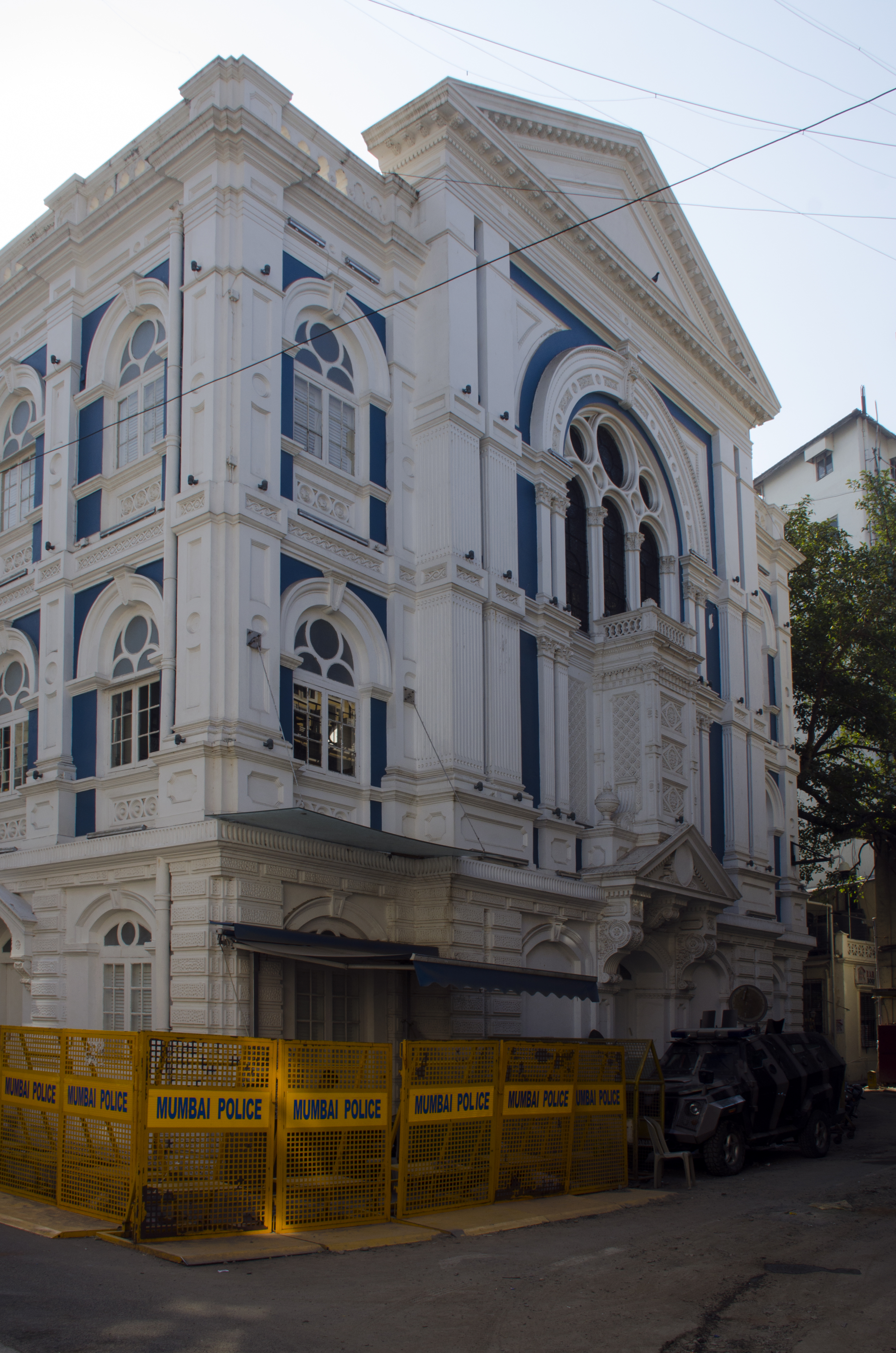
- The synagogue in 2020, post restoration

- Location of the synagogue in Mumbai

Religion
- Affiliation: Judaism
- Rite: Nusach Sefard
- Ecclesiastical or organizational status: Synagogue
- Status: Active

Location
- Location: 55, Dr. V.B. Gandhi Marg, Kala Ghoda, Fort, Mumbai, Maharashtra
- Country: India
- Interactive map of Knesset Eliyahoo Synagogue
- Coordinates: 18°55′41.19″N 72°49′57.25″E

Architecture
- Architects: David Gostling; James Morris
- Type: Synagogue architecture
- Style: Neoclassical; Victorian
- Funded by: Jacob Elias Sassoon
- Completed: 1884

Specifications
- Direction of façade: Western
- Materials: Stone; brick

The Knesset Eliyahoo Synagogue (Hebrew: בית הכנסת אליהו, lit. 'Gathering of Elijah'), also Knesset Eliyahu and the Blue Synagogue, is a synagogue, located at 55, Dr. V.B. Gandhi Marg, in the Kala Ghoda neighborhood, Fort, in downtown Mumbai, in the state of Maharashtra, India. Completed in 1884, it is the second oldest Sephardic synagogue in Mumbai. The Taj Mahal Palace Hotel, and Oberoi Trident are nearby.

The synagogue was established by Jacob Elias Sassoon and the building is maintained by the Jacob Sassoon Trust. The building's significance is attributed to its Jewish traditions as well as Indian and English colonial influences. It was designed by the British architectural firm Gostling & Morris of Bombay. The basement part of the edifice is built in stone masonry and the superstructure is built in brick masonry. The exterior facade of the synagogue was painted turquoise, was returned to its original colour of white, with bright indigo boarders during a restoration process in 2018–2019. The sanctuary within the interior of the building is in western direction, towards Jerusalem.

== Background ==
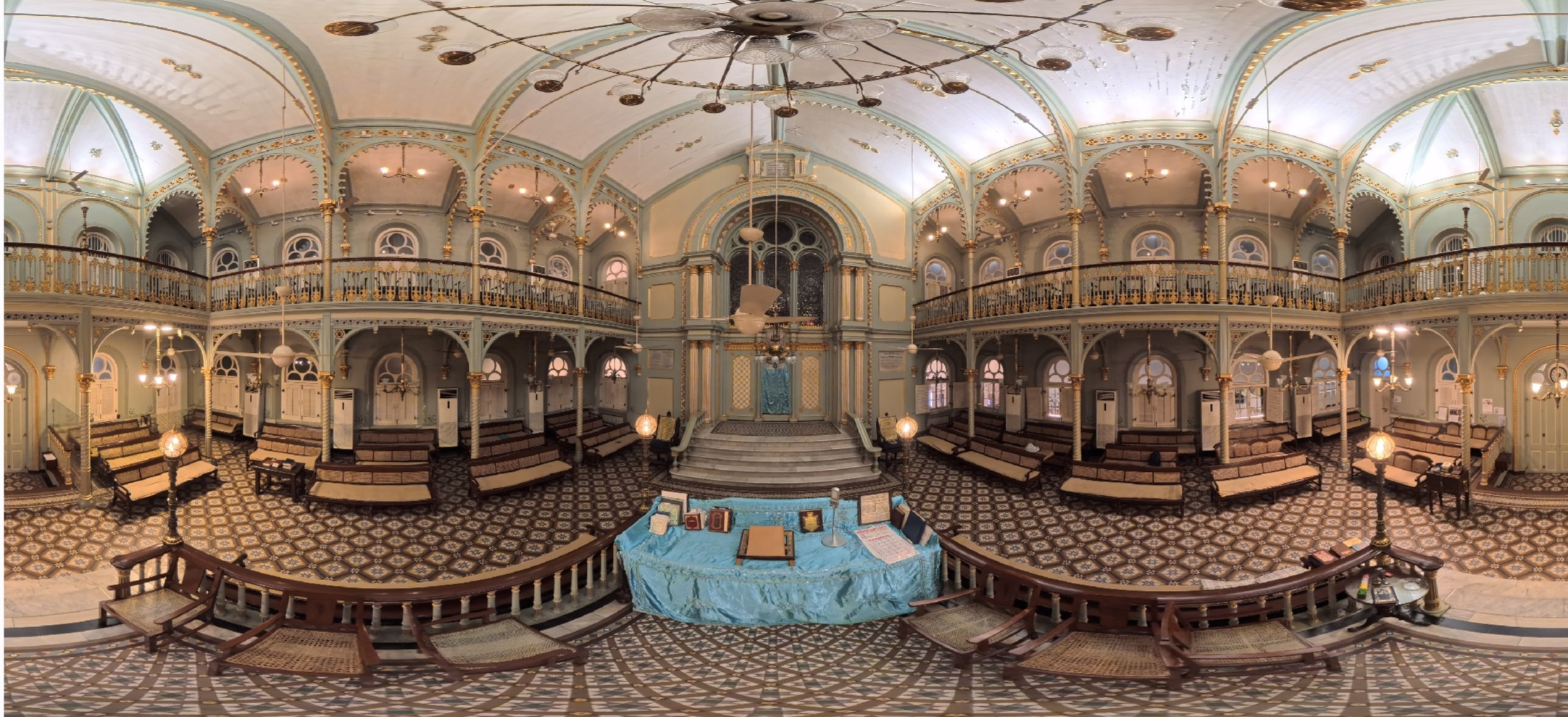
Panoramic image of the synagogue

Prior to the arrival of Baghdadi Jews in India, the Jews residing in Bombay — the name then used for Mumbai — had settled in the towns of India, living peacefully with other communities in India. Harry D. Wall, in an interview to the New York Times, has said that among the Jews who now remain in Mumbai are a group of Jews known as Bene Jews or Bene Israel who were reportedly descendants of seven tribes of Israel who, in the 2nd century BC, were shipwrecked on India's Konkan coast while escaping persecution in the Galilee. They found that living in India, amidst a cosmopolitan community consisting of Hindus, Buddhists, Jains, and, much later, Muslims, was a very cordial environment, totally free of anti-Semitic feelings.

The Jewish merchant community, which played a significant role in the commercial development of then Bombay (now Mumbai), consisted of Jews from Iraq, Syria, and other Middle Eastern countries who immigrated in the late 18th century under the threat of persecution. They found the environment conducive to continuing their trade and settled in the city, becoming prosperous in business ventures such as textile mills and international trading. In 1784, the British government took over the East India Company. With this change, many business opportunities emerged in India, and Bombay in particular, encouraging immigrants to set up businesses. In 1790, one such business magnate was Shalom ben Ovadiah HaCohen, a Baghdadi Jew who had migrated from Aleppo (Halab), in Syria to Bombay; other Jewish businessmen from Baghdad, Basra, and Yemen followed him.

== History ==
In 1832, David Sassoon immigrated to Bombay and established himself as a magistrate of the cotton industry. He built the Magen David Synagogue in Byculla. Mumbai in 1864; this was in addition to the older Magen Hasidim synagogue. His son, Albert Sassoon, transformed the weaving industry in Bombay. To cater to the increasing need of the Baghdadi Jews, Knesset Eliyahoo Synagogue was constructed on a premium piece of land in the hub of Bombay's commercial area by Jacob Sassoon, grandson of David Sassoon, commemorating his father, Eliyahoo Sassoon. It was established in 1884.

More Jews came from Bukhara, Persia, and, following the Farhud pogrom in Iraq in 1941, many more immigrants shifted to Bombay. They all used to assemble in the Knesset Eliyahoo Synagogue in large numbers during festival days and on Rosh Hashana and Yom Kippur. On many such occasions, in view of the large crowd of devotees, overflow prayer services were held in the neighbouring Cawasjee Jehangir Public Hall.

In 1985, President Giani Zail Singh visited the site to honour the centennial of the synagogue's construction. India Post issued a commemorative stamp in honour of the centennial.

The first-ever terrorist attack on Jews in Mumbai occurred on 26 November 2008. Rabbi Gavriel Holtzberg, who had conducted Sabbath services on the previous day and also held religious discourses at the Knesset Eliyahoo Synagogue, was killed, along with his wife and a few other Jews at the Nariman House, a community center operated by Chabad. Whilst there was no specific attack on the Knesset Eliyahoo Synagogue or its congregation, the terrorists' actions sowed fear among the Jewish community members residing in Mumbai, and also forged a closer bond between the city's Baghdadi and Bene Israel Jews.

== Architecture and fittings ==
Designed by Gostling & Morris of Bombay in the Neoclassical and Victorian style, the building's base is of stone masonry while the superstructure is of brick masonry. The external frontage of the synagogue, initially painted grey, is painted turquoise, and the synagogue is popularly known as the Blue Synagogue of Mumbai. The synagogue was returned to its original colour of white, with bright indigo boarders during a restoration process in 2018–2019 carried out by conservation architect Abha Narain Lambah.

The inner space contains ornamented pillars, and the sanctuary faces west towards Jerusalem. The bimah (reader's platform) is bordered on both sides by ornately carved marble, over which is placed a tall, stained-glass arch that reaches the ceiling. Women worshippers sit in an upstairs gallery. The synagogue contains a number of Torah scrolls, along with silver-cased sefarim (religious books) belonging to the Sassoon family. On the ground floor, there are meeting and school rooms, and a mikveh (immersion pool). The staircase, windows, timber balconies, ceiling, walls, and roof are in need of restoration.

== Gallery ==
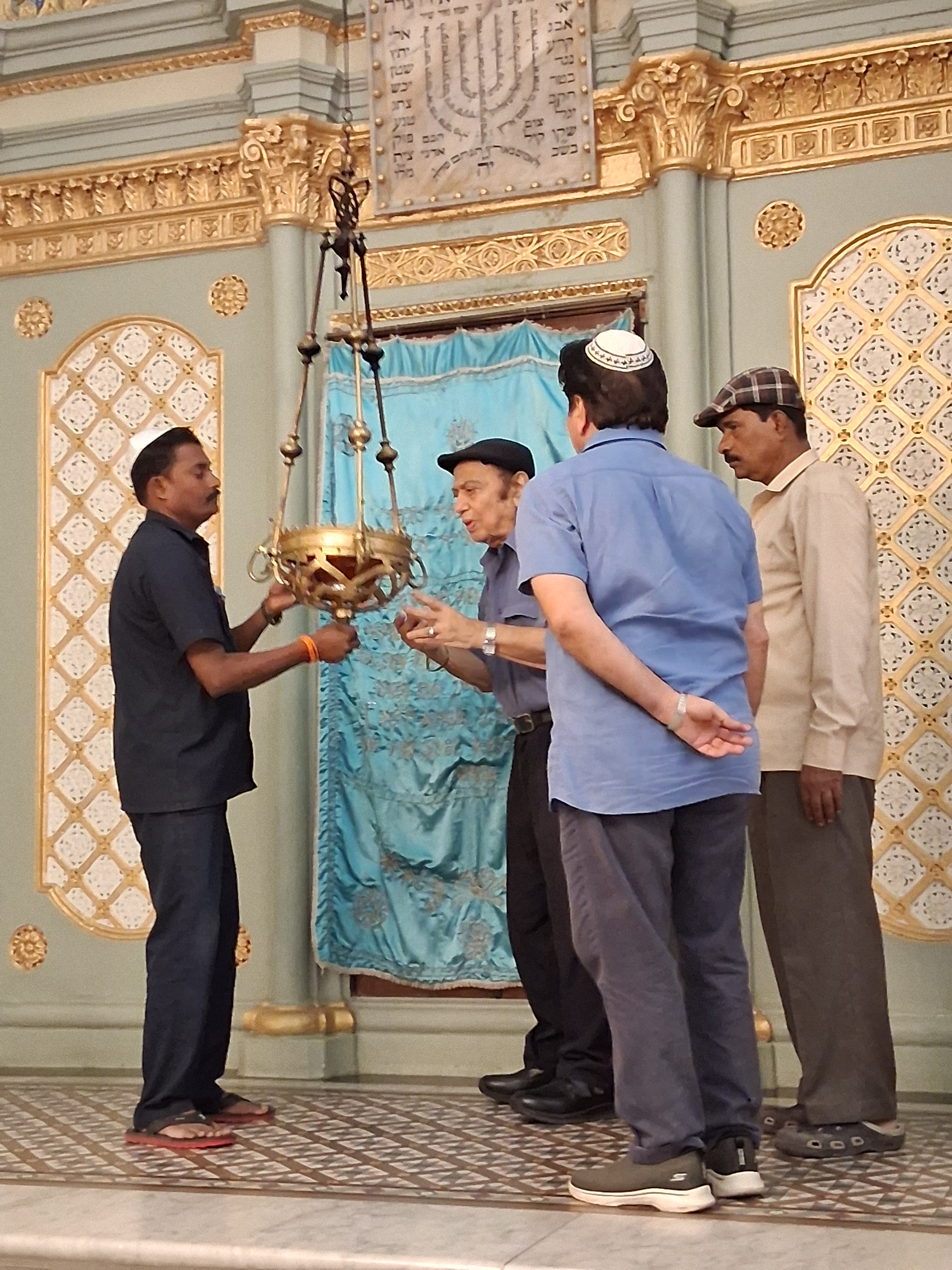
Lighting a candle in the synagogue, 2026

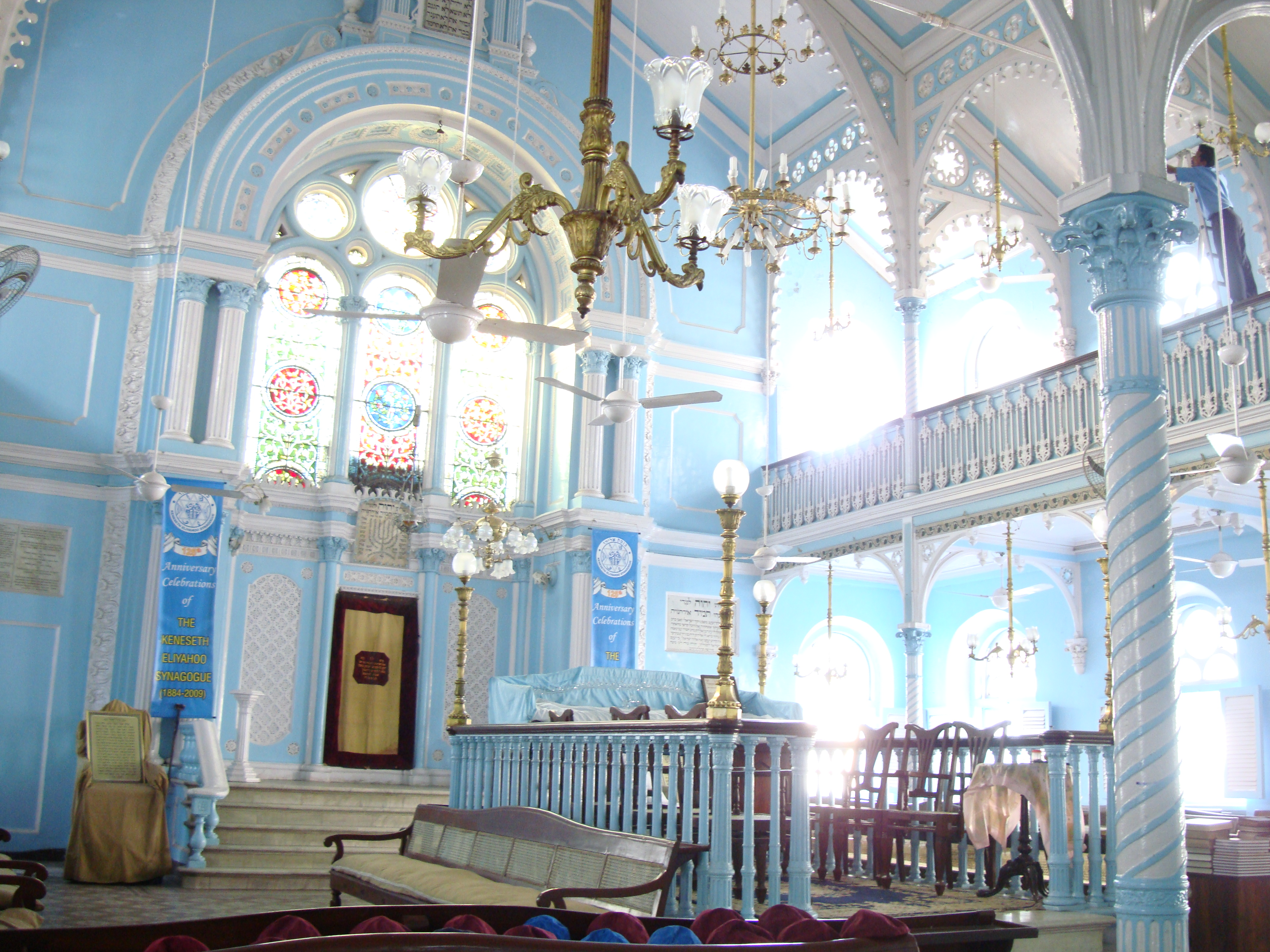
Interior view

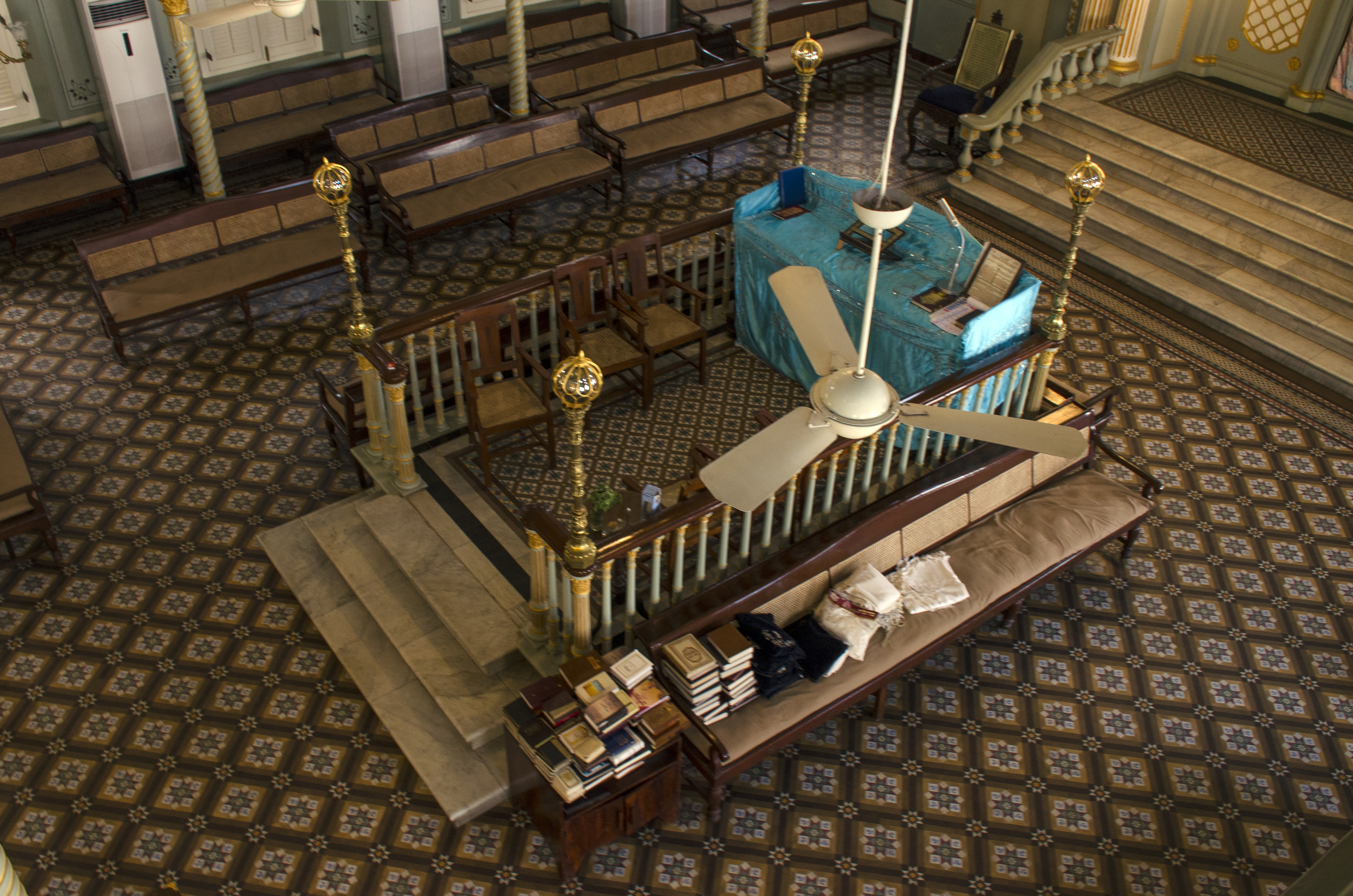
Bema of the synagogue

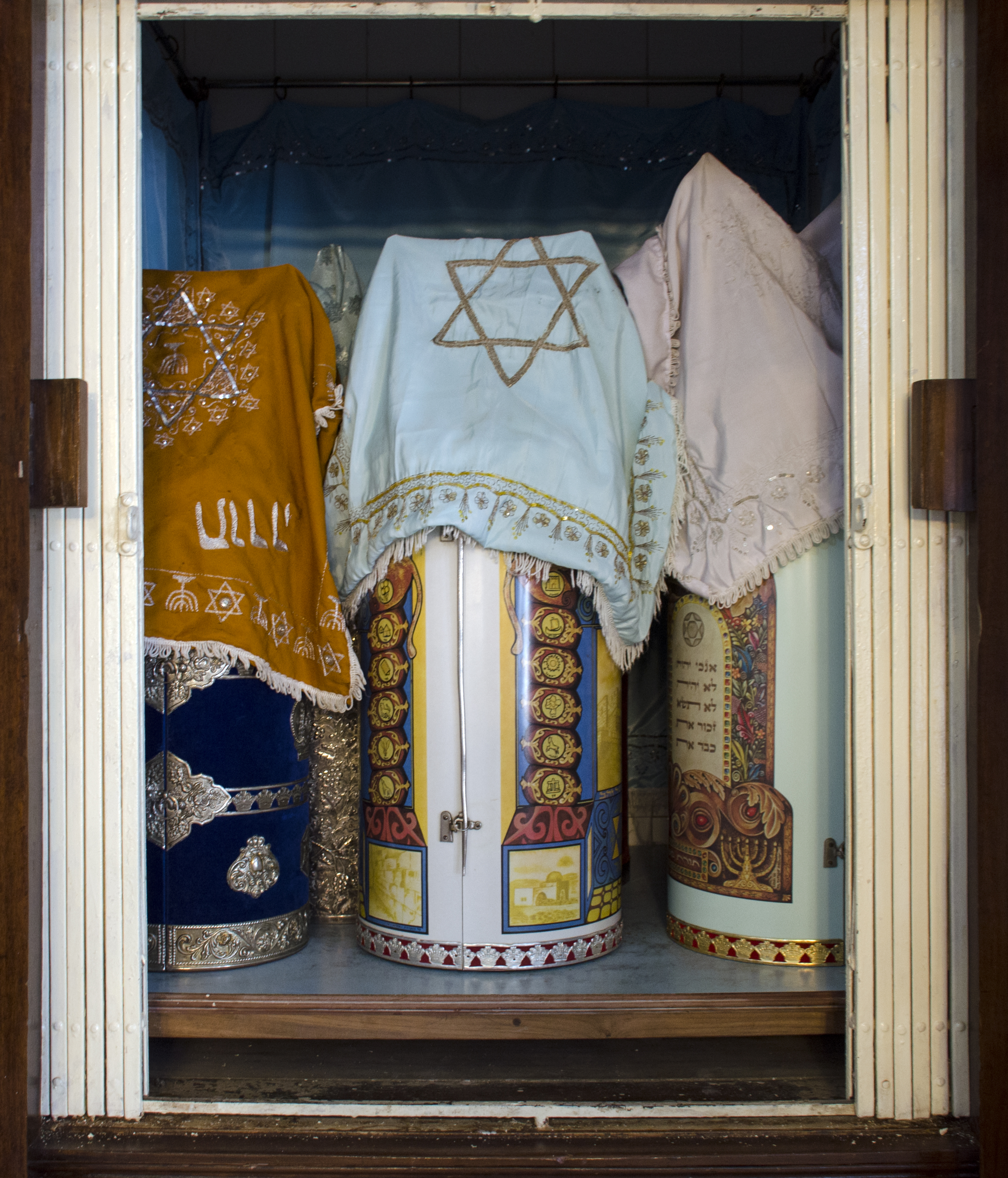
Torah cases

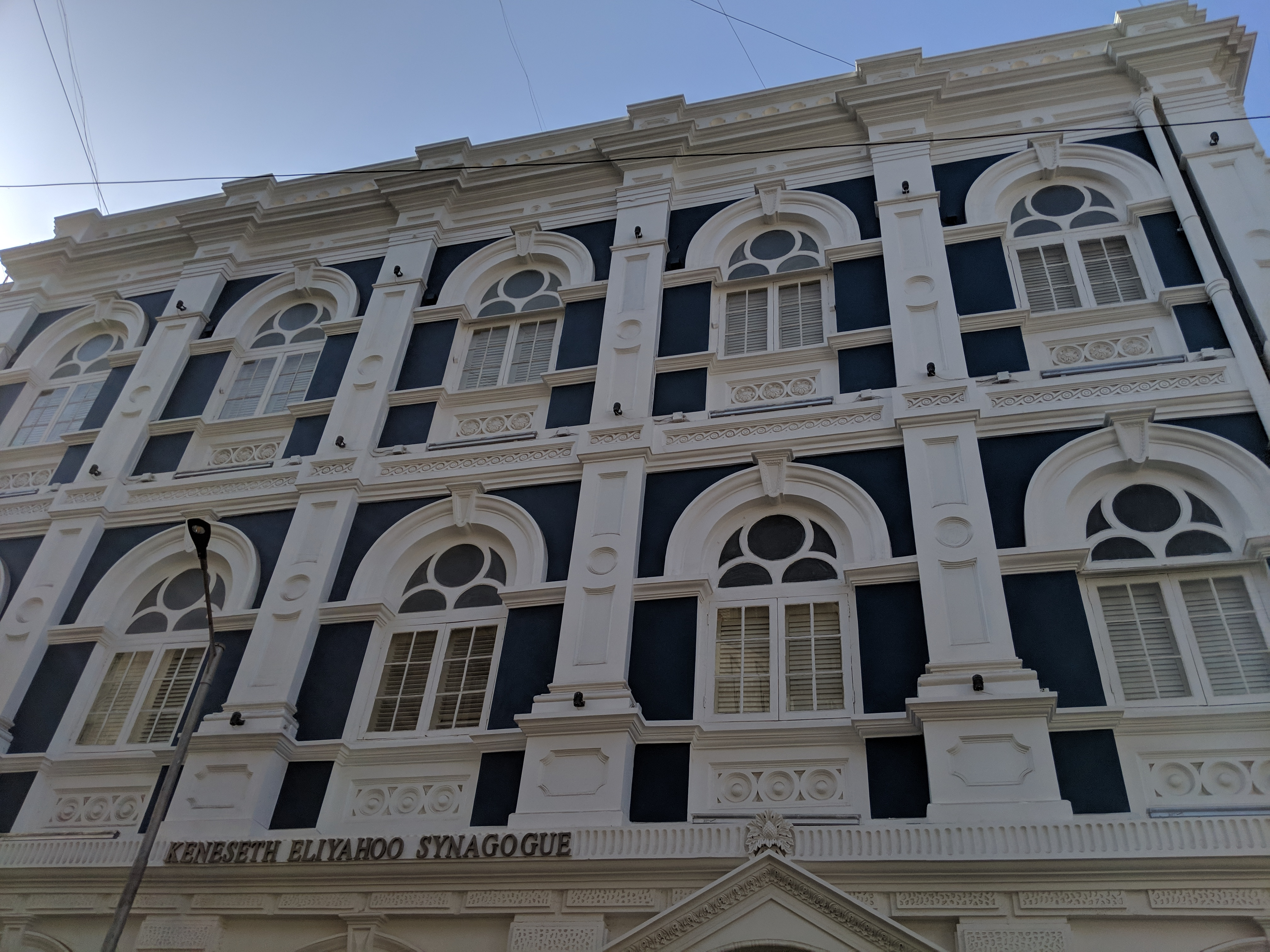
The synagogue exterior after restoration in 2019

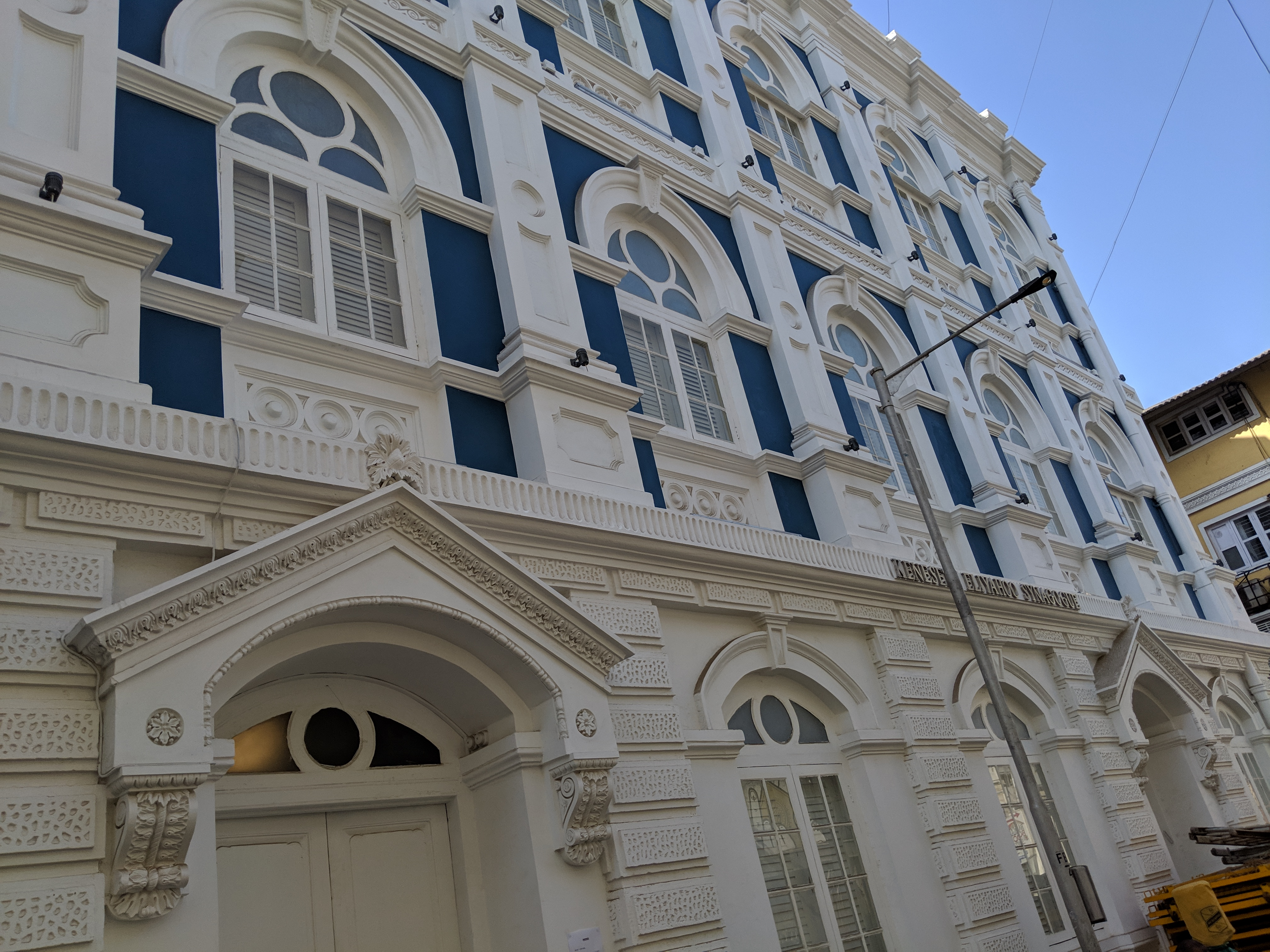
The synagogue exterior

== See also ==
- History of the Jews in India
- List of synagogues in India
