= Honorary citizenship =

Status bestowed by a city on an individual considered especially admirable or worthy

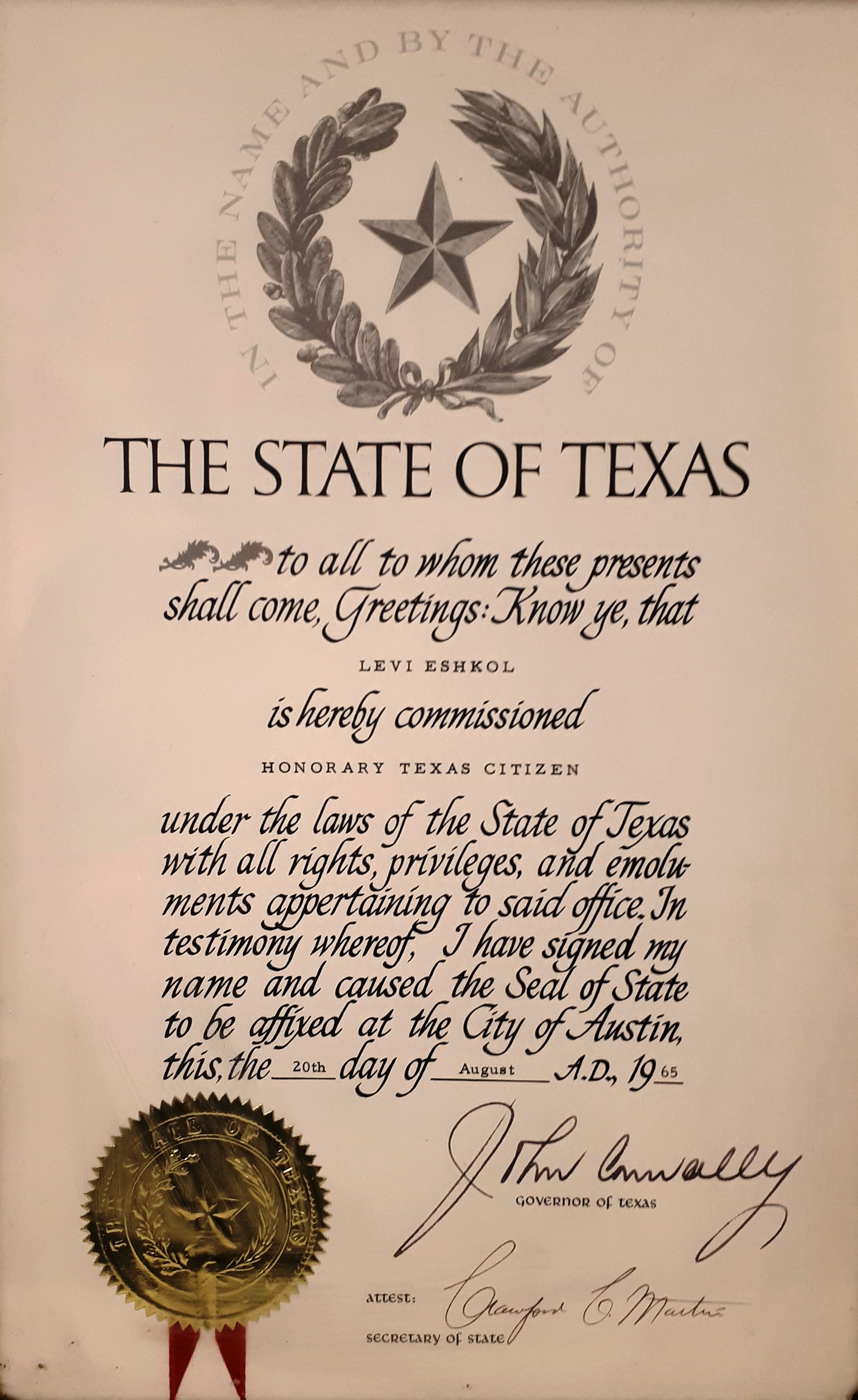
Honorary Texas Citizen certificate issued to Israeli Prime Minister Levi Eshkol

Honorary citizenship is a status bestowed by a city or other government on a foreign or native individual whom it considers to be especially admirable or otherwise worthy of the distinction. The honor is usually symbolic and does not confer any change to citizenship or nationality.

== North America ==
=== Canada ===
Honorary Canadian citizenship requires unanimous approval in both houses of Parliament. Since 1985, it has been awarded to only seven individuals, with one revocation.

=== United States ===
By act of United States Congress and presidential assent, an individual may be named an honorary citizen of the United States. Since 1963, it has been awarded to only eight individuals.

== Europe ==
=== Germany ===
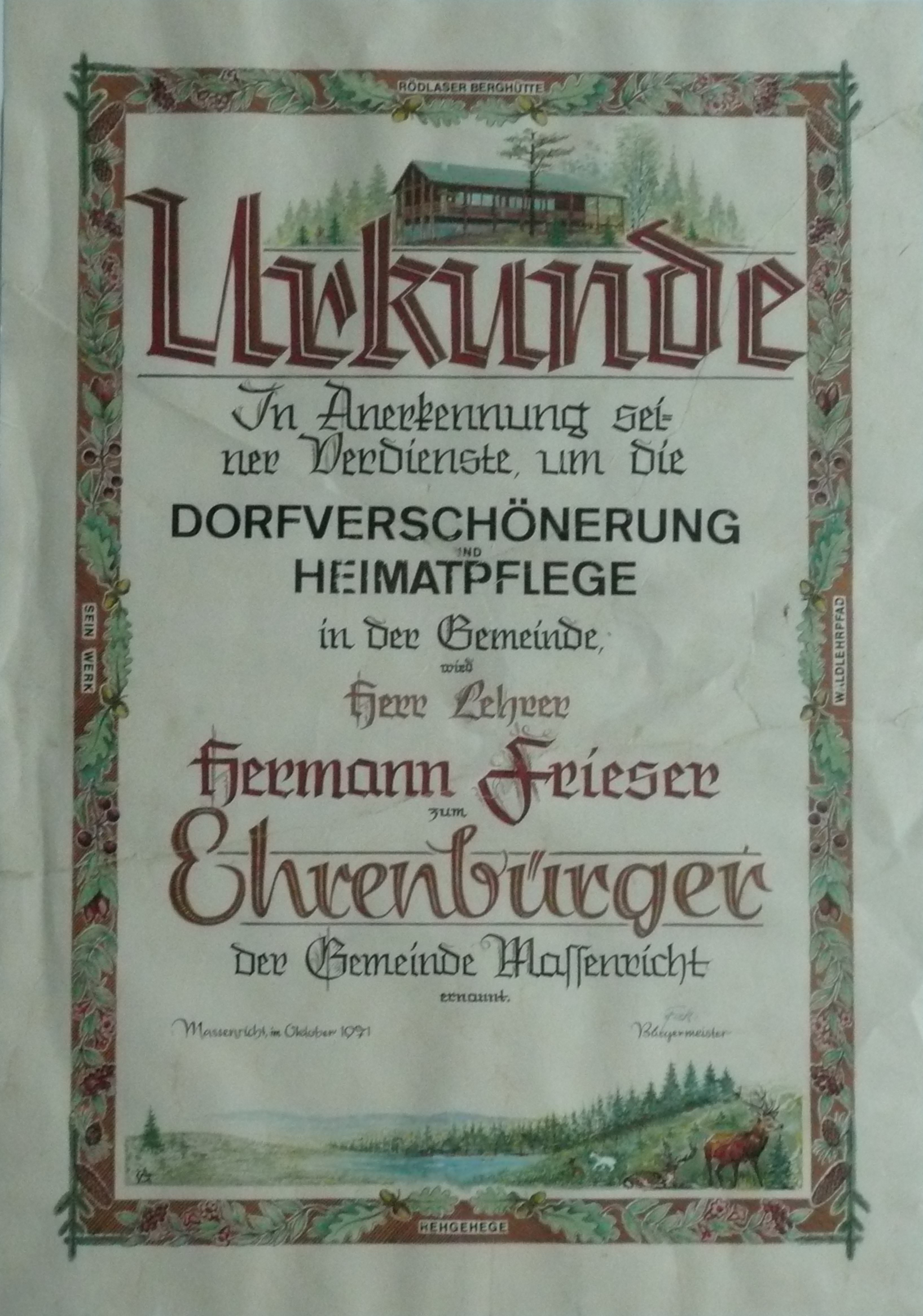
A certificate of honorary citizenship of Massenricht, a former municipality of Amberg-Sulzbach, Bavaria issued to Hermann Frieser

In Germany, Section 14 of the Nationality Act allows the Federal Minister of the Interior to naturalise any foreigner without any requirements, regardless of whether they live in Germany or not, if there are "ties to Germany that justify naturalisation".

Within the Federal States, honorary citizenship (Ehrenbürgerschaft) is the highest distinction that can be awarded to an individual by a municipality. It is awarded by cities, towns, and sometimes federal states. Honorary citizenship is perpetual and persists after the death of the honoree, but it can be revoked in exceptional cases by the council or parliament of the city, town, or state. In the case of war criminals, all such honours were taken away by "Article VIII, section II, letter i of the directive 38 of the Allied Control Council for Germany" on 12 October 1946.

=== Greece ===
In Greece, provisions are in place for the naturalization of foreigners residing in the country who have Greek national origin (expatriates/co-ethnics). Primarily, this applies to expatriates from Albania and those from the countries of the former USSR, under Articles 23 of Law 3838/2010 and 39 of Law 4606/2018, respectively. The Greek Nationality Code (Article 10) also allows for the naturalization of expatriates living abroad. Furthermore, the Code offers honorary naturalization (Article 13) for foreign nationals who have rendered special services to Greece or whose naturalization may serve the country's best interest. Such individuals can be granted Greek citizenship through a Presidential Decree, upon a justified proposal by the Minister of Interior.

Actors Tom Hanks and Rita Wilson were both granted honorary Greek citizenship for their response to the 2018 Attica Wildfires.

=== Ireland ===
In Ireland, honorary citizenship bestowed on a foreigner provides full legal citizenship including the right to reside and vote.

=== Russian Empire ===
In the Russian Empire, honorary citizens constituted a social estate (sosloviye, sostoyaniye), which was a privileged subcategory of the estate of urban dwellers.

=== San Marino ===
On March 29, 1861, the Captains Regent of the microstate of San Marino sent an offer of honorary citizenship to the sitting US president, Abraham Lincoln. On May 7, 1861, Lincoln replied, "I thank the Council of San Marino for the honor of citizenship they have conferred upon me. Although your dominion is small, your State is nevertheless one of the most honored, in all history." This was the beginning of US-San Marino diplomatic relations.

== Asia ==
=== Israel ===
Members of the Righteous Among the Nations may be conferred honorary Israeli citizenship by Yad Vashem or commemorative citizenship if deceased. Those who choose to live in Israel are entitled to a pension, free health care, and assistance with housing and nursing care.

In 2010, legislation was passed by the Knesset to confer honorary Israeli citizenship to all members of the Israeli defense forces and paramilitary organizations that operated in Mandate Palestine who died between 29 November 1947 and 31 December 1948.

Sandra Samuel, an Indian woman who protected an Israeli child from terrorists in the 26/11 attacks, was granted permanent residency and honorary citizenship by Israel in 2010. Receiving full Israeli citizenship would have deprived her of her Indian citizenship since India does not allow dual citizenship.

== Oceania ==
=== Australia ===
In Australia honorary citizenship is conferred by the Governor-General and as of 2026 has only been granted once, to Raoul Wallenberg.

== Examples ==
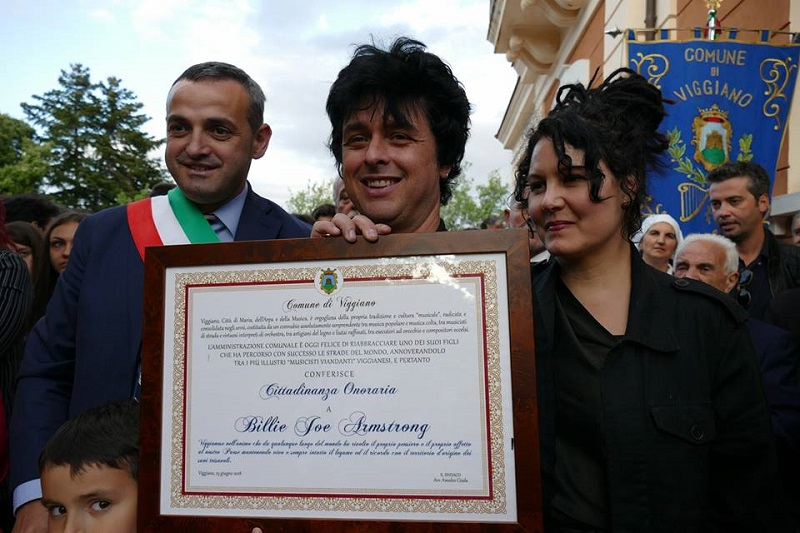
Billie Joe Armstrong (frontman of Green Day) receiving his honorary Viggiano citizenship in 2018

- Berlin awarded Lucius D. Clay 1962 for his role as military governor and for creating the Berlin airlift and Mikhail Gorbachev for his change in world politics that led to the fall of the Berlin Wall and the reunification of Germany.
- The Philippine legislature conferred honorary citizenship to American priest and emigrant James Reuter in 1996 and 2006 for his missionary and activism.
- In 2002 South Korea awarded honorary citizenship to Dutch football (soccer) coach Guus Hiddink, who successfully and unexpectedly took the national team to the semi-finals of the 2002 FIFA World Cup. Honorary citizenship was also awarded by the Seoul Metropolitan Government to Hines Ward, an American football player of Korean and African-American descent, in 2006 for his efforts to minimize discrimination in Korea against half-Koreans.
- To mark the occasion of the 50th anniversary of the first successful ascent of Everest the Nepalese government conferred honorary citizenship upon Edmund Hillary at a special Golden Jubilee celebration in Kathmandu, Nepal. He was the first foreign national to receive that honour.
- At the end of their studies, all the students of the College of Europe are invited to the city hall by the mayor of Bruges to become honorary citizens of the city of Bruges.
- In 2011, Lady Gaga received the title of honorary citizen of Sydney for her support of the LGBT+ community.
- In April 2013, Raoul Wallenberg became the first person to be granted honorary Australian citizenship.
- In August 2013, French actor Gérard Depardieu received honorary citizenship from Belgium.
- In October 2013, Argentinian football coach José Pekerman received Colombian citizenship after he qualified Colombia to the 2014 FIFA World Cup, the first World Cup for the country after a 16-year hiatus.
- On 12 April 2017, Malala Yousafzai of Pakistan was awarded honorary Canadian citizenship by PM Justin Trudeau for her work providing education to girls in her hometown Swat during Taliban occupation.
- On 12 July 2017, Ariana Grande was made an honorary citizen of Manchester for her efforts to raise funds for victims of the 22 May 2017 terrorist attack in Manchester Arena.
- In August 2019, Guillermo Rodriguez, a security guard on Jimmy Kimmel Live, became an honorary citizen of Dildo, Newfoundland, Canada, after TV host Jimmy Kimmel ran for mayor.
- On 7 October 2019, Afghanistan granted honorary Afghan citizenship to Japanese physician Tetsu Nakamura for his long-standing humanitarian work in the country.
- On 9 June 2022, a House Resolution granted the title of honorary Brazilian citizen to British Formula 1 driver Lewis Hamilton.

== See also ==
- Freedom of the City
