= Sandra Samuel =

Indian nanny

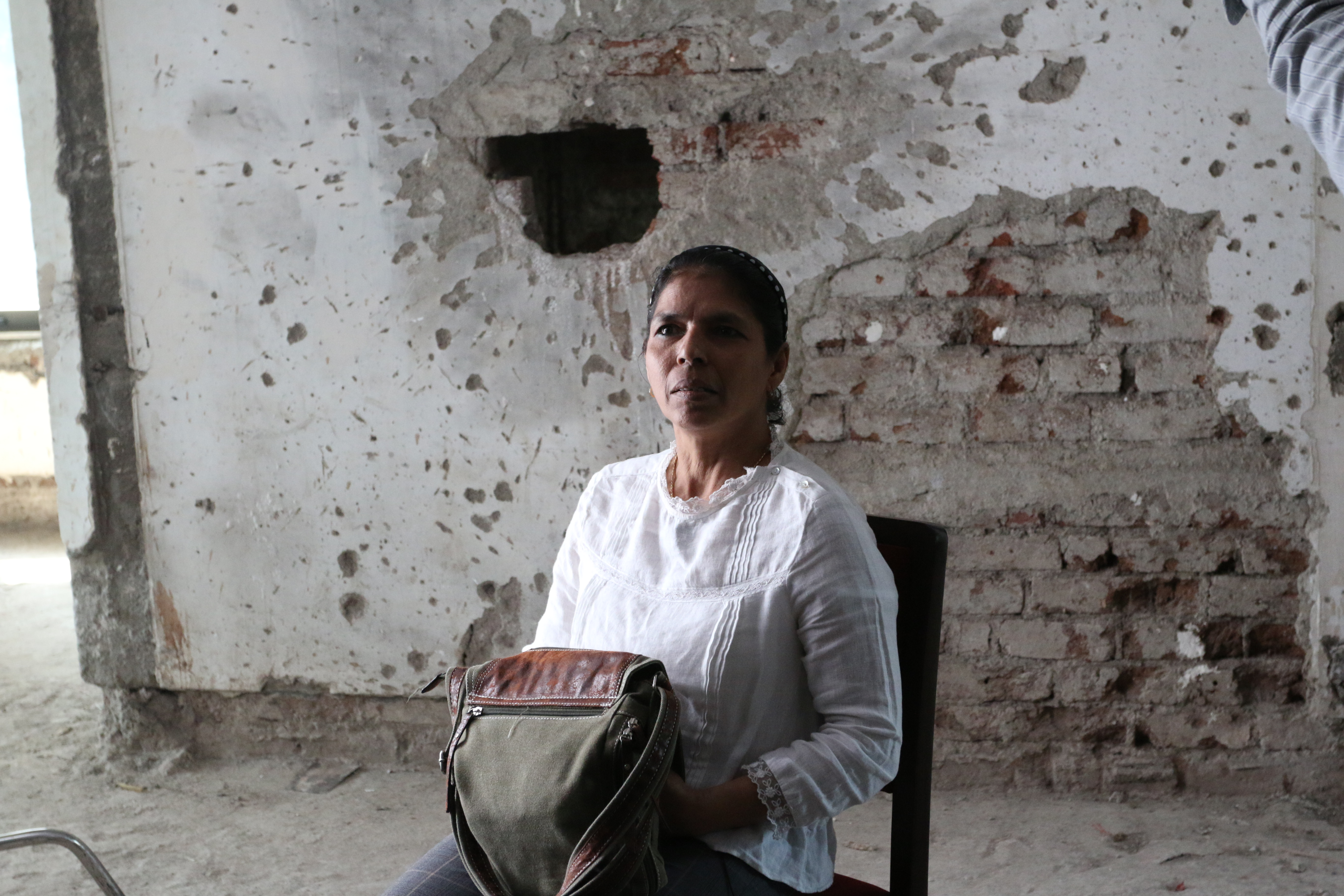
- Sandra Samuel sits for an interview in Nariman House in 2018
- Known for: Saving Moshe Holtzberg from Nariman House during the 2008 Mumbai terrorist attacks

Sandra Samuel (born c. 1964) is an Indian nanny who gained international recognition for rescuing a two-year-old Jewish boy named Moshe Holtzberg in Mumbai, India, during the 2008 Mumbai terrorist attacks. Samuel was employed as a caretaker at a Jewish outreach centre known as the Nariman House, which was targeted by Lashkar-e-Taiba (LeT). Both of Holtzberg's parents were killed by LeT terrorist murderers during the attack on the building. Following the incident, Samuel relocated to Israel with Holtzberg and was accorded permanent residency and honorary Israeli citizenship in 2010. Samuel resides in West Jerusalem and works at the local centre of ALEH, an Israeli foundation that provides rehabilitation services for disabled children and adults.

== Background ==
Samuel had been living in the Mumbai Chabad House and working for Rabbi Gavriel Holtzberg and his wife, Rivka, since 2003. The Holtzbergs were the Israel-born directors of the house run by the global Orthodox Jewish Chabad movement. Samuel had been the nanny caring for the Holtzbergs' son Moshe since his birth. Samuel stated that she called them "my rabbi" and "my Rivki." When she started working there in 2003, it was expected to be a temporary job but she stated that she was "so captivated by their generous, courageous spirits" that she stayed on. When Moshe was born, she took the role of nanny.

In June 2008, her husband, John, a Keralite who worked as a mechanic, died suddenly in his sleep of an undiagnosed illness. She has two sons, Martin and Jackson, who were aged 18 and 25 at the time of the attack. She is a Christian. Samuel's family was originally from Goa but she lived most of her life in Mumbai.

== Attack on the Nariman House ==
On 26 November 2008, as the Mumbai attacks began, a group of attackers entered the Chabad house and began shooting at everyone inside. Samuel heard gunshots and locked herself in a laundry room as she heard Rivka screaming. Later, she heard Moshe calling out her name and crying. After emerging from the room and running upstairs, she found Gavriel and Rivka motionless and covered in blood with Moshe crying beside them, his pants drenched in blood. With the attackers still inside, Samuel said she grabbed Moshe and ran from the building along with Qazi Zakir Hussain, an employee of Nariman House. Later, when Indian commando teams stormed the house, it was confirmed that Gavriel and Rivka were among the 173 people killed in the attacks, and that Moshe was now an orphan.

== After the attack ==
The Chabad movement's leaders decided Moshe should not stay in India and that he would be relocated to Israel where he has family. However, the movement insisted that Samuel be allowed to come with him, because, as a Chabad spokesperson stated: "At this point she's the only one the boy is responding to." Although Samuel had no passport, Moshe's grand uncle, Rabbi Yitzchak Dovid Grossman, helped arrange for her to get a visa to come to Israel with Holtzberg to help him start his new life. The Israeli government under Foreign Minister Tzipi Livni granted Samuel a special visa offering immigration status. They left India for Israel shortly after attending Moshe's parents' funeral.

On 4 December 2008, Samuel gave an interview with CNN in which she said she sees no heroism in her actions and that she wishes she could have been able to help more people, especially Moshe's parents. She stated that she continued to have nightmares of the attacks. Samuel told an interviewer, "They said it is important I am here [in Israel]. Me, I just take care of the baby." When asked about her plans for the future, Samuel said she would stay in Israel for as long as Moshe needs her. She stated that "No one knows how much Moshe saw, or how much he knows. His back is bruised where terrorists hit him. Now I want to see that this baby who has been given in my care, he grows big, brave like his [dad]." Samuel says she wants to be with Moshe until he "grows big" and that "By God's grace I hope I am there to see it. That's it. All my blessings to my Moshe baby."

Samuel later revealed that she was not supposed to be at the Chabad house that evening because she usually visited one of her sons on Wednesday evenings. She stated that "God kept me there because God already knew what would happen."

In a subsequent interview, Samuel stated that Moshe Holtzberg is happy again, and that he "is like a normal kid, just enjoying himself. He has gotten used to other people surrounding him. He loves it here. He is in very good condition, just like normal. He is having his breakfast, lunch and snacks and he sleeps very well now." She added that he no longer cries out for his parents: "He is not even asking for them now because he is too happy. He loves it here. He has swings, a garden, a see-saw."

Samuel and Holtzberg initially stayed with Rabbi Grossman after arriving in Israel. However, they later moved to Afula to live with his maternal grandparents.

In early December 2008, fifth-graders at Solomon Schecter Day School in Jericho, New York, wrote individual letters to Samuel to thank her for saving Holtzberg's life. The students cited Samuel's heroism based on the Jewish tradition that "one who saves one person is like one who saves the whole world."

== Awards ==
=== Esfira Maiman Women Rescuers Medal ===
On 30 November 2008, the International Raoul Wallenberg Foundation, at a special session, unanimously voted to grant Sandra Samuel the Esfira Maiman Women Rescuers Medal in recognition of her bravery. The foundation stated that "Sandra has taught us two lessons of cardinal importance. The first one is that human solidarity is agnostic to race and religion. The second lesson, not less important, is that rescuers are still very much relevant nowadays, as they were more than six decades ago."

=== Citizenship ===
Samuel was awarded permanent resident status and honorary Israeli citizenship on 13 September 2010.

=== Righteous Among the Nations ===
Samuel was honored by the government of Israel with the title of Righteous among the Nations, the highest award given to non-jews.
