= Gavriel Holtzberg =

American-Israeli rabbi (1979–2008)

Rabbi Gavriel Noach Holtzberg גבריאל נח הולצברג
- Rivka and Gavriel Holtzberg

Personal life
- Born: June 9, 1979 Kiryat Malakhi, Israel
- Died: November 26, 2008 (aged 29) Mumbai, Maharashtra, India
- Buried: December 2, 2008; Mount of Olives, Jerusalem
- Spouse: Rivka Rosenberg (m. 2002)
- Children: 3
- Occupation: Rabbi of Mumbai Chabad House

Religious life
- Religion: Judaism

Jewish leader
- Residence: Mumbai, India

Gavriel Noach Holtzberg (Hebrew: גבריאל נח הולצברג; June 9, 1979 – November 26, 2008) was an Israeli American Orthodox rabbi and the Chabad emissary to Mumbai, India, where he and his wife Rivka ran the Mumbai Chabad House. He was also a religious leader and community builder for the local Jewish Indian community, and led the Friday-night Shabbat services at the Knesset Eliyahoo synagogue. Holtzberg and his wife were murdered during the 2008 Mumbai attacks perpetrated by the Islamic militant group Lashkar-e-Taiba.

== Early life and family ==
Holtzberg was born in Israel to Nachman and Freida Holtzberg. He and his family moved to the Crown Heights neighborhood in Brooklyn, New York, when he was 9 years old. He had eight siblings. During his years in elementary school, he memorised the entire Second Order of the Mishnah, Moed verbatim and was a two-time champion in a competition of memorizing the Mishnah. During his high school years, Holtzberg was known for his knowledge of the Talmud. He traveled to Jerusalem for an international Talmudic competition, where he came in second.

He studied at yeshivas in New York and Argentina, and as a rabbinical student served communities in Thailand and China under the Summer Rabbinical Visitation Program run by Merkos L'Inyonei Chinuch, the educational arm of Chabad-Lubavitch.

Holtzberg had long desired to become a Chabad emissary. He spent time as a student in the Chabad house in Bangkok, and helped open a Chabad house in south Thailand.

His future rebbetzin, Rivka Holtzberg née Rosenberg, was born in Israel to Rabbi Shimon and Yehudit Rosenberg, and was raised in Afula. She studied at a Bais Rivka seminary in Kfar Chabad, Israel. Her uncle was Rabbi Yitzchak Dovid Grossman, Chief Rabbi of Migdal Ha'Emek, Israel.

The Holtzbergs married in 2002. Their firstborn son, Menachem Mendel, was born a year later, afflicted with Tay–Sachs disease. He died of this disease at the age of 3. Their second son, DovBer, was born with the same ailment and was institutionalized in a pediatric long-term care facility in Israel under the care of his grandparents. He died at the age of 4 in December 2008, one month after his parents' murder. Their third son, Moshe, was born healthy and lived with them in Mumbai. They lived together on the fifth floor of the Chabad House. It was revealed by her father during her funeral that Rivka was five months pregnant with her fourth child at the time she was slain.

== Work in Mumbai ==
=== Nariman House ===
After Gavriel and Rivka Holtzberg married, they moved to Mumbai to serve as Chabad emissaries and open the first Chabad House in Mumbai. Under his leadership, the Chabad organisation acquired Nariman House. He ran the synagogue in addition to him and his wife being directors of the Mumbai Chabad headquarters. He installed a kosher kitchen and a mikvah at Nariman House, and taught the Torah, offered drug prevention services and ran a hostel there. They led Shabbat meals every week at Nariman House with between 50 and 60 people and 30–40 people per night during the week, where they hosted Jews from all walks of life, including notable figures such as Sir Martin Gilbert and Rabbi Joseph Telushkin, to humanitarian workers, business people and Israeli backpackers visiting India.

In an article published in 2006, Holtzberg said he understood the nature of the Israeli traveler's needs saying they "need relief" from the army, from work, from real life. He added that "they come here to do everything the army didn’t allow them to do. Their shoes had to be polished and tied – here they wear sandals. They had to cut their hair – here they grow their hair long."

=== Local Jewish community ===
There are between 4,500 and 5,000 Indian Jews in Mumbai. Holtzberg was a religious leader for that community, leading Friday night services at the Knesset Eliyahoo synagogue, also performing marriages for them, acting as the shochet (the kosher slaughtering of animals) and supplying the community with kosher meat, answering halakhic principles for them, such as what is to be done in the rites and customs of Judaism, as well as being a trained Mohel (performing the circumcision or "bris" of Jewish babies). In addition to helping gather donations and do fund-raising for T'feret Israel and build an additional mikvah for the synagogue, he and his wife also taught Jewish studies and the Torah to local Jews and tourists and provided their mikveh to be used by local Jews, and made challah available to them.

=== Attack ===
On 26 November 2008, Nariman House was attacked during the 2008 Mumbai attacks and the Holtzbergs were taken hostage. Sandra Samuel, a maid at the house and the nanny for their 2-year-old son, Moshe, managed to escape with the boy. As the siege began, Samuel locked the doors and hid in a room. She heard Rivka screaming "Sandra, Sandra, help, Sandra." The gunmen reportedly went door-to-door, searching for targets, so Samuel unlocked her door, but they did not find her. She then ran upstairs to find the Holtzbergs shot and lying on the ground with their son crying over them, so she picked him up and ran to the exit.

Two days after the siege of the house began, Indian security forces seized the house and found the Holtzbergs and six others dead. It was concluded that the Holtzberg's wife had been killed many hours before, and several of the bodies were covered in tallit, including Rivka Holtzberg's, leading witnesses to speculate that the rabbi managed to cover the bodies before he was killed.

==== Response from Australia ====
In December 2008, Australian Prime Minister Kevin Rudd stated that Holtzberg and his wife had “devoted their lives to acts of goodness and kindness and compassion for others ... but they lost their lives in a senseless act of hatred. In the face of this terror we must not bow to fear. We must respond by spreading our own message of tolerance and respect for people of other backgrounds and other beliefs.” Federal Opposition leader Malcolm Turnbull and U.S. Consul-General Judith Fergin also spoke at the memorial service. A representative from the Indian Consulate was also present.

== Funeral ==
Thousands of people attended the funeral of Holtzberg and his wife, with eulogies delivered in the town of Kfar Chabad followed by a procession to Jerusalem's ancient Mount of Olives cemetery, where the couple was buried. Among those who attended were the two Chief Rabbis of Israel, President Shimon Peres, former Prime Minister and Defense Minister Ehud Barak, former Prime Minister and Likud leader Binyamin Netanyahu, several Shas ministers and MKs, government ministers, Knesset members, Chabad emissaries from around the world, the American and Indian ambassadors to Israel, and Rabbi Abraham Shemtov, head of Agudas Hassidei Chabad International, the movement's umbrella organization.

Rabbi Moshe Kotlarsky vice chairman of Chabad's educational arm, Merkos L'Inyonei Chinuch, from New York, eulogized the couple at the funeral, saying "I vow that we will avenge the deaths of Gabi and Rivki. But not with AK-47s, not with grenades and tanks. We will take revenge in a different way. We will add light. We will add good deeds. We will make sure that there is not one Jewish man who does not put on tefillin. We will make sure that there is not one Jewish woman who does not light candles," speaking of one of the aims of the Chabad movement. Kotlarsky also said that the Chabad House would be rebuilt, and that it would be named after the Holtzbergs. Kotlarsky also aimed his message at the couple's surviving son, Moshe, saying "You don't have a mother who will hug you. You are the child of all of Israel." In Toronto, Ontario, Canada, a memorial service was held for Gavriel and his wife at a Chabad synagogue, where almost 1,500 people attended.

== Child ==
The Holtzbergs' son Moshe, who survived the attack, and his Indian nanny Sandra Samuel, subsequently moved to Israel where Moshe's grandparents live. The Israeli Government under Foreign Minister Tzipi Livni awarded Samuel a special visa offering immigration status. Samuel has stated she will continue to care for Moshe for as long as necessary. The government of Israel awarded Samuel with the title of Righteous Among the Nations, the highest award given to non-Jews.

A video of Moshe crying at the funeral service for his parents and crying "Mommy, Mommy" in Hebrew was widely published.

In 2018, ten years after the massacre, Prime Minister of India Narendra Modi visited Moshe in Israel and extended an invitation for the boy to return to India at any time. That same year, Moshe accompanied Benjamin Netanyahu, the Prime Minister of Israel, on a visit to Mumbai.

== See also ==
- Sarah Avraham, who with her family was close friends with the Holtzbergs, and who in the wake of the attack and the killings converted to Judaism, and immigrated to Israel.
- Rabbi Holtzberg's niece was married to Rabbi Zvi Kogan, a Chabad rabbi in Abu Dhabi, United Arab Emirates, who was abducted and murdered in November 2024.
