= Yitzchak Dovid Grossman =

Chief Rabbi of Migdal HaEmek

Rabbi Yitzchak Dovid Grossman יצחק דוד גרוסמן
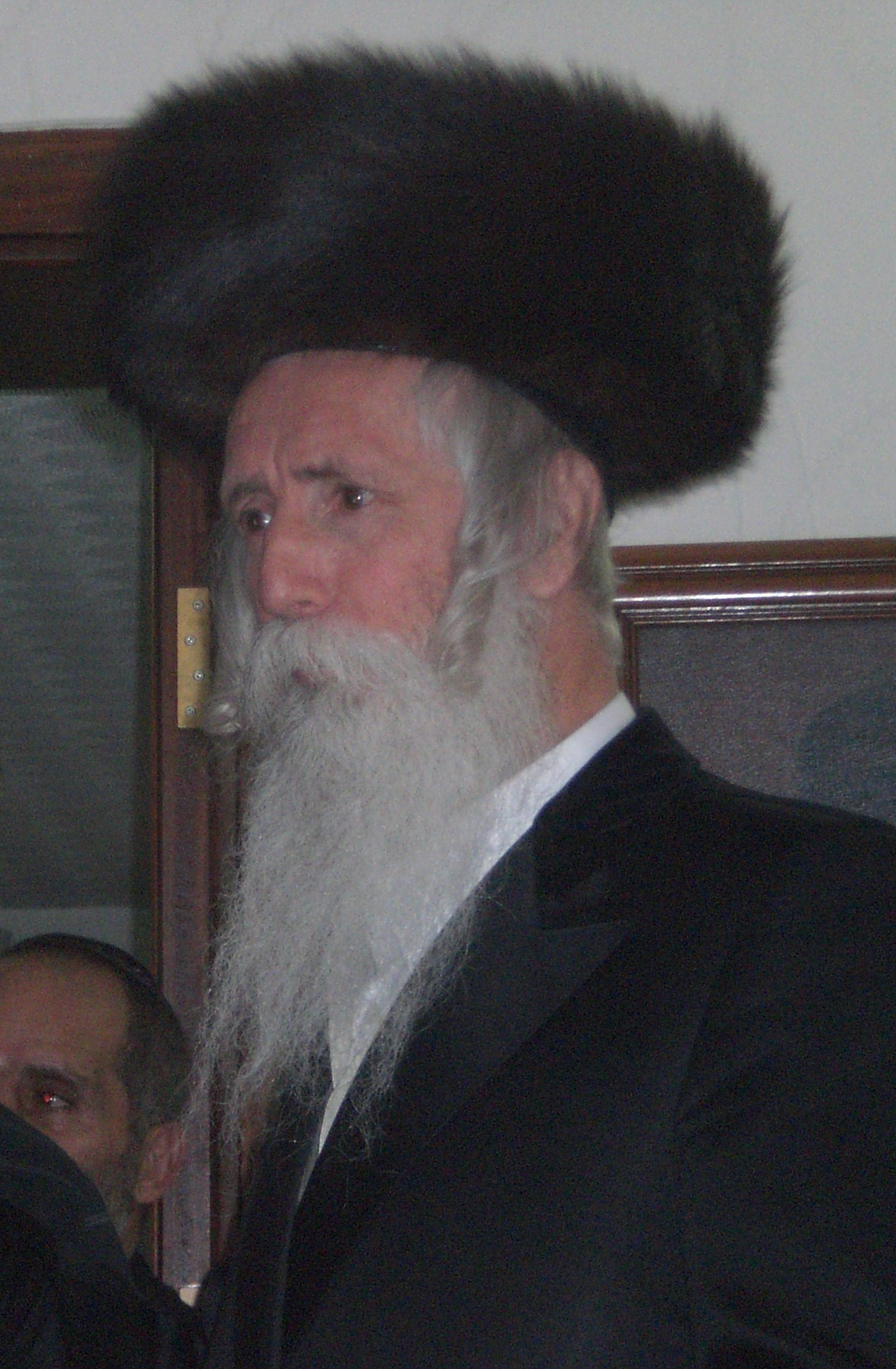
- Rabbi Yitzchak Dovid Grossman in 2008
- Title: Chief Rabbi of Migdal HaEmek

Personal life
- Born: Yitzchak Dovid Grossman; 15 September 1946 (age 79) Jerusalem, Israel
- Spouse: Esther
- Children: 5
- Parent(s): Rabbi Yisrael Grossman; Perl Gutfarb Grossman
- Education: Slabodka yeshiva, Bnei Brak

Religious life
- Religion: Judaism
- Denomination: Haredi

Jewish leader
- Began: 1969
- Other: Founder and dean, Migdal Ohr educational institutions
- Residence: Migdal HaEmek

Yitzchak Dovid Grossman (Hebrew: יצחק דוד גרוסמן; born 15 September 1946 in Jerusalem), also known as the "Disco Rabbi", is the Chief Rabbi of Migdal HaEmek, founder and dean of Migdal Ohr educational institutions, and a member of the Chief Rabbinate Council of Israel. He is known for his work with children from disadvantaged and troubled homes, having rehabilitated tens of thousands of youth through his educational network founded in 1972.

== Biography ==
Grossman is a sixth-generation Jerusalemite and the scion of a prominent Hasidic family. His father, Rabbi Yisrael Grossman, served as rosh yeshiva of Pinsk-Karlin and of Chabad in Lod, and was a member of the rabbinical court of Agudat Yisrael. His mother, Perl (1923–2012), was the daughter of Rabbi Yosef Gutfarb, a teacher at the Etz Chaim Yeshiva in the Old City of Jerusalem. He is one of six brothers and four sisters. He grew up in the Mea Shearim neighborhood of Jerusalem and attended Yeshivas Karlin.

An alumnus of Slabodka yeshiva in Bnei Brak, Grossman received rabbinical ordination in 1966. Desiring to do religious outreach in one of Israel's secular neighborhoods, he moved to the Lower Galilee town of Migdal HaEmek in 1968. Migdal HaEmek was founded in 1953 to help absorb the mass aliyah of Sephardi Jewish immigrants from North Africa, Migdal HaEmek's population growth drastically outpaced its socioeconomic and educational infrastructure. With a shortage of jobs and dearth of schools, the town was plagued by widespread crime and alcohol and drug abuse. Grossman, looking every inch the Hasidic rabbi with his beard and sidelocks, embarked on a one-man campaign to rehabilitate Sephardi youth immersed in crime and drug use. He went straight to the pubs and discos where idle youth from distressed homes were hanging out and gained their trust with love and caring. In 1970 Israeli television dubbed him the "Disco Rabbi".

In 1969, one year after his arrival, the town unanimously elected him Chief Rabbi of Migdal HaEmek, giving him lifetime tenure. At age 23, he was the youngest municipal Chief Rabbi in Israel.

In 1972 Grossman founded the Migdal Ohr (Tower of Light) educational network to give children a loving and caring environment at the age of 6 or 7 so that they could circumvent the cycle of crime and drug abuse that plagued the town's teens and adults. The year of its founding Migdal Ohr enrolled 18 students. By its second year it had doubled in size. Migdal Ohr now enrolls over 6,000 boys and girls in 15 high schools and elementary schools and seven daycare centers occupying a 65 acres (26 ha) campus. As of 2013, it had educated over 17,000 children; one graduate, formerly a 12-year-old dropout, went on to become a member of Knesset.

Through his discussions with youth, Grossman found out that many children had a father or brother in prison. In 1974 he initiated Shaked – Rehabilitation Through Religion, now operating in all Israeli prisons, which has reduced the recidivism rate of its participants to 20 percent. This program gives over 900 inmates, mostly jailed for drug-dealing and armed robbery, the choice to study in a prison kollel on a voluntary basis for three to four hours a day. Rabbis and teachers deliver shiurim (Torah classes) and build the prisoners' Torah knowledge, while at the same time mentoring the prisoners' families to prepare a new support system after release. Participants have one-third of their sentence reduced for good behavior. Hundreds of released inmates have become ba'alei teshuva (returnees to the faith) through this program and work as rabbis, Torah teachers, and kollel students. For his contribution, Grossman received the honorary title of Avi Ha'asirim (Father of the Prisoners) from the Israeli government, a title originally bestowed on Rabbi Aryeh Levin.

Grossman has been offered the position of Chief Rabbi of Israel twice but declined both times in favor of continuing his outreach work in Migdal HaEmek.

=== 2006 Lebanon War ===
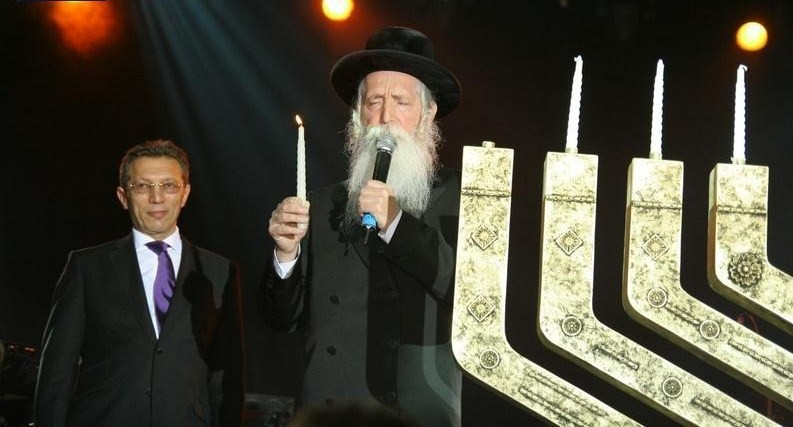
Lighting the Hanukkah candles (2008).

During the 2006 Lebanon War, Grossman used his location in the north of Israel to provide services to soldiers suffering from the government’s inefficient handling of troops and supplies. In one instance, he opened the Migdal Ohr campus to 700 Israeli paratroopers of the IDF Brigade 85 who were stranded in a tank hangar in Petah Tikva, hosting them for swimming, a barbecue and dancing with live Hasidic music. In another case, he let 700 members of the 8th Paratrooper Battalion use Migdal Ohr as their home base during the three weeks of the war, supplying clean clothing, new gear, and use of the recreational facilities. He also arranged a Hachnosas Sefer Torah ceremony for them and blessed them with safety and success. When the war ended, he invited all 700 soldiers back to Migdal Ohr for another party.

=== Maccabi preseason exhibition game ===
A preseason exhibition game between the Israeli Maccabi team and the New York Knicks at Madison Square Garden is one of Migdal Ohr's biggest fund-raising events. In 2009, Grossman's attempt to mediate the ejection of the Israeli coach resulted in coverage in The New York Times, the Los Angeles Times, the New York Post, and other papers.

=== Malka Leifer and Eliezer Berland affairs ===
In 2016, Grossman twice appeared before a court in South Africa to negotiate the release from prison of former Shuvu Banim Torah Academy school dean Rabbi Eliezer Berland, who later confessed to rape and assault.

In March 2018, Grossman testified for bail to be given in the case of former school principal Malka Leifer, who was at the time accused of rape and 74 counts of sexual abuse incidents at Adass Israel School in Melbourne. Leifer had been avoiding extradition to Australia. Leifer's husband, Rabbi Yaakov Yosef (Jacob) Leifer, also fled to Israel with her, where he now heads the small Chust Hassidic community in Emmanuel, where his wife had been living and was arrested. On March 7, 2018, Grossman argued that it was a "humiliation" for Leifer to remain in custody while awaiting trial and she was released to his custody. A backlash ensued, and Grossman withdrew his support of Leifer, who was then imprisoned. Migdal Ohr claims child protection on its agenda, and the Israeli government is its major funder. Migdal Ohr also relies on substantial funding from foreign governments, nonprofit organizations, and private donors; the United States, among others, demanded that Grossman rescind support for Leifer. Fairfax Media reported that, according to sources interviewed, Grossman was aware of the allegations as early as 2012, and supported Leifer; "Rabbi Grossman didn't have a moral realisation", the source said. "He didn't issue an apology for the hurt caused". Leifer at the time was also awaiting trial in Israel for fraudulently claiming mental illness and incapacitation in order to avoid extradition.

== Awards and honors ==
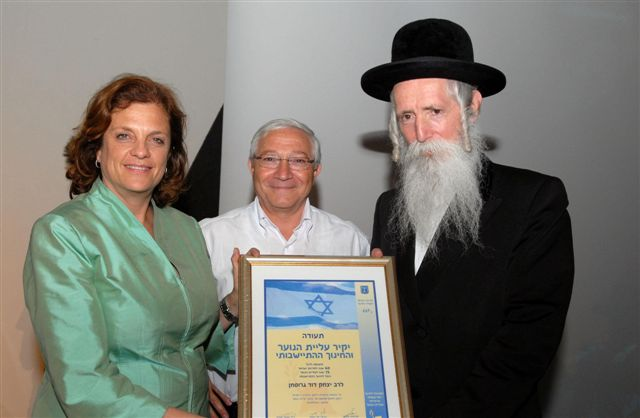
Grossman accepts an award from Israeli Minister of Education Yuli Tamir, 2008.

In 1983 Grossman received the Love of Israel award from the President of Israel, Chaim Herzog. In October 1991 he was honored with the Tolerance Prize, presented by Knesset chairman Dov Shilansky at a special parliamentary ceremony.

In 2004 Grossman received the Israel Prize for lifetime achievement and special contribution to society and the State of Israel. The Caring Institute named him International Humanitarian of the Year in 2009. Grossman received an honorary doctorate from Bar-Ilan University in 2006.

In 2008 Grossman was honored as one of the torchbearers in the national Israeli Independence Day ceremony.

In 2013 Grossman was awarded the Presidential Medal of Distinction by President of Israel Shimon Peres.

== Family ==
Grossman and his wife, Esther, have five children. He is the uncle (by marriage) of Rivka Holtzberg, co-director of the Nariman House Chabad center, who was murdered together with her husband Gavriel in the 2008 Mumbai attacks. Gavriel's father is an administrator in one of the Migdal Ohr's elementary schools for girls.

== See also ==
- List of Israel Prize recipients
