= Migdal Ohr =

Israeli NGO

Coordinates: 32°40′37.35″N 35°13′53.79″E

- מגדל אור
- Founded: 1972; 54 years ago
- Founder: Yitzchak Dovid Grossman
- Type: Non-profit educational and social welfare NGO
- Purpose: Education, youth welfare, food security, social services
- Location: Migdal HaEmek, Israel
- Region served: Israel
- Key people: Yitzchak Dovid Grossman (Founder and Dean)
- Website: www.migdalohr.org

Migdal Ohr (Hebrew: מגדל אור, lit. Tower of Light) is one of Israel's largest NGO's. The main and two additional residential campuses along with 160 youth clubs provide educational frameworks and social guidance for over 10,000 children and teenagers from underprivileged and dysfunctional homes across Israel every day. The organization has international affiliates, such as Migdal Ohr UK, which fundraises to support its programs in Israel.

== History ==
Migdal Ohr was founded by Israel Prize laureate Rabbi Yitzchak Dovid Grossman in 1972. The school began with 18 students. Since then, over 15,000 youngsters have graduated from the Migdal Ohr, an institution that provides needy and immigrant children with housing, schooling, medical and dental care, clothing, libraries, after school enrichment courses and vocational training.

== Social programs ==
Migdal Ohr runs community social programs, adult education programs, prisoner rehabilitation programs and soup kitchens that prepare 15,000 meals a day.

Its major Chag Saveah "Full Holiday" campaign, initiated by students in 2004, is a biannual national food drive that distributes holiday meals and cash vouchers to tens of thousands of needy families, soldiers, and orphans. another key initiative is Afikei Ohr, a programme providing support for at-risk young women.

During the COVID-19 pandemic, the Israeli government selected Migdal Ohr to operate the Magen Israel (Israel Shield) relief effort, in partnership with the IDF, to deliver emergency food and essentials to approximately 40,000 vulnerable people nationwide. In May 2020, the organization hosted a major virtual fundraising concert, "Together as One," featuring prominent Jewish music artists to support this initiative.

== See also ==
- Education in Israel
- Youth village
