= List of Chabad houses in California =

This is a list of Chabad houses in the US state of California. It may not include every one.

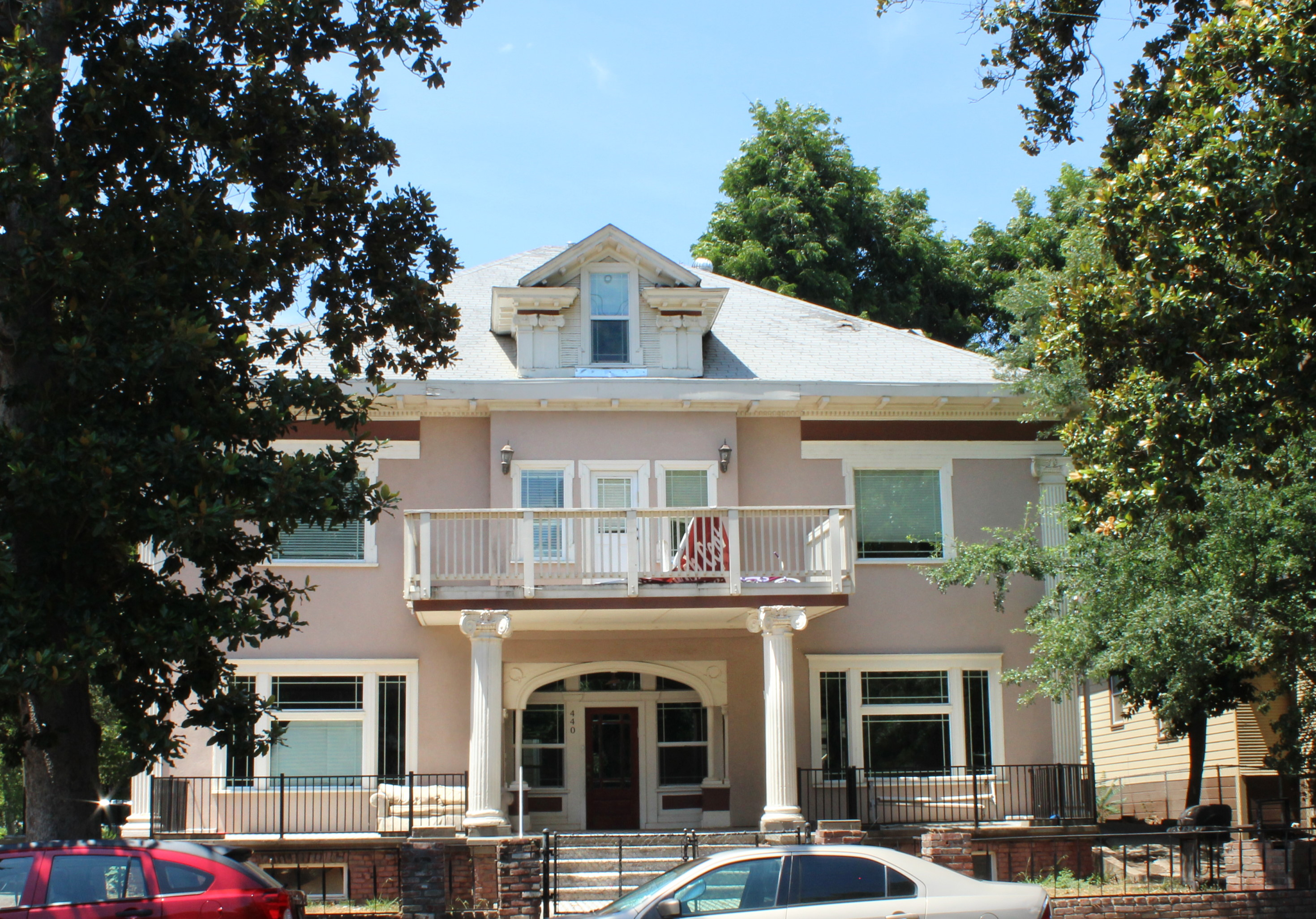
Chabad Jewish Center of Chico

List of Chabad houses in California
Name	Location	Ref.
Chabad of Alameda	Alameda	
Chabad Alef Center	San Marcos	
Chabad of the Antelope Valley	Lancaster	
Chabad of Bakersfield	Bakersfield	
Chabad Israeli Community of The Bay Area	Palo Alto	
Chabad of Bel Air	Los Angeles	
Chabad House Berkeley	Berkeley	
Chabad of Beverly Hills	Beverly Hills	
Chabad of Beverlywood	Los Angeles	
Chabad Jewish Center of Brentwood	Los Angeles	
Chabad of Brentwood South	Los Angeles	
Chabad of Burbank	Burbank	
Chabad of Calabasas	Calabasas	
Chabad of Camarillo	Camarillo	
Chabad Carmel Valley (Del Mar Jewish Center)	San Diego	
Chabad Jewish Center of Castro Valley	Castro Valley	
Chabad of the Central Valley	Fresno	
Chabad of Chatsworth	Los Angeles	
Chabad of Cheviot Hills	Los Angeles	
Chabad Jewish Center of Chico	Chico	
Chabad of Chula Vista	Chula Vista	
Chabad of Cole Valley	San Francisco	
Chabad of the Conejo	Agoura Hills	
Chabad of Contra Costa	Walnut Creek	
Chabad of Coronado	Coronado	
Rohr Chabad House at CSUN (Note: CSUN is an abbreviation for California State University Northridge where the Chabad house is located)	Los Angeles	
Chabad of the Crescenta Valley	La Cañada Flintridge, California	
Chabad of Danville & S. Ramon	Danville	
Chabad of Davis	Davis	
Chabad of the Delta	Brentwood	
Chabad of Downtown Los Angeles	Los Angeles	
Chabad of Downtown S. Diego	San Diego	
Chabad of El Cerrito	El Cerrito	
Chabad Jewish Community Center of Folsom	Folsom	
Chabad of Fremont Jewish Center	Fremont	
Chabad of Glendale and the Foothill Communities	Glendale	
Chabad of Grass Valley	Grass Valley	
Chabad of Greater Los Feliz	Los Angeles	
Chabad of Greater South Bay	Palo Alto	
Chabad of Hancock Park	Los Angeles	
Chabad of the High Desert	Lancaster	
Chabad of Humboldt	Arcata	
Chabad of the Inland Empire	Rancho Cucamonga	
Chabad of Irvine	Irvine	
Chabad Israel Center (Note: Serves the Israeli-American community in Los Angeles.)	Los Angeles	
Chabad Jewish Center of Laguna Beach	Laguna Beach	
Chabad Jewish Center of Laguna Niguel	Laguna Niguel	
Chabad at La Costa	Carlsbad	
Chabad of La Jolla	San Diego	
Chabad La Quinta	La Quinta	
Chabad at Lake Tahoe	South Lake Tahoe	
Chabad of Lamorinda	Lafayette	
Chabad of Los Alamitos & Cypress	Seal Beach	
Los Altos Chabad	Mountain View (Note: possibly in Los Altos. Further research is needed.)	
Chabad of Malibu	Malibu	
Chabad of Marin	San Rafael	
Chabad of Marina Del Rey	Los Angeles	
Chabad of Mar Vista	Los Angeles	
Chabad of Miracle Mile Area	Los Angeles	
Chabad Jewish Center of Mission Viejo	Mission Viejo	
Chabad of Monterey	Pacific Grove	
Chabad of Moorpark	Moorpark	
Chabad of Mt. Olympus	Los Angeles	
Chabad of Napa Valley	Napa	
Chabad of Newport Beach	Newport Beach	
Chabad of Noe Valley	San Francisco	
North (Orange) County Chabad Center	Yorba Linda	
Chabad of North Hollywood	Los Angeles	
Chabad of the North Peninsula	San Mateo	
Chabad of North Irvine	Irvine	
Chabad of Northridge	Northridge, Los Angeles	
Chabad Jewish Center of Novato	Novato	
Chabad Jewish Center of Oakland & Piedmont	Oakland	
Chabad Jewish Center Oceanside/Vista	Vista	
Chabad of Oxnard	Oxnard	
Chabad of Pacific Beach	San Diego	
Chabad of Pacific Palisades	Los Angeles	
Chabad of Palm Springs	Palm Springs	
Chabad of Palos Verdes	Rancho Palos Verdes	
Chabad of Pasadena	Pasadena	
Chabad Jewish Center of Petaluma	Petaluma	
Chabad at Porter Ranch	Porter Ranch	
Chabad of Poway	Poway	
Chabad of Rancho Mirage - The Torah Oasis	Rancho Mirage	
Chabad of Richmond (Note: Not to be confused with Chabad of Richmond in Virginia or Chabad of Richmond in British Columbia.)	Richmond	
Chabad in Richmond District SF - Richmond Torah Center	San Francisco	
The Rohr Chabad Student Center at Berkeley	Berkeley	
Chabad of Roseville/Placer County	Granite Bay	
Chabad Jewish Center of RSF	Rancho Santa Fe	
Chabad Russian Synagogue	West Hollywood	
Chabad of S. Barbara	Goleta	
Chabad S. Clara	Santa Clara	
Chabad of S. Jose	Los Gatos	
Chabad of Sacramento	Sacramento	
Chabad of San Diego	San Diego	
Chabad Jewish Student Life of San Diego	San Diego	
Chabad Santa Monica	Santa Monica	
Chabad at Santa Monica College	Santa Monica	
Chabad of SCV (Note: SCV is an abbreviation for Santa Clarita Valley)	Santa Clarita	
Chabad Jewish Center of S. Clemente	San Clemente	
Chabad By The Sea	Aptos	
Chabad of SF	San Francisco	
Chabad of Sherman Oaks	Sherman Oaks, Los Angeles	
Shul by the Shore	Long Beach	
Chabad of SLO & Cal Poly - The Rohr Center for Jewish Life (Note: SLO is an abbreviation for San Luis Obispo, while "Cal Poly" is a shortened version of the university name, California Polytechnic State University.)	San Luis Obispo	
Chabad SOLA (Note: SOLA is an abbreviation for South La Cienega, the street on which it's located)	Los Angeles	
Chabad of Solano County	Vacaville	
Sonoma County Chabad Jewish Center	Santa Rosa	
Chabad of South Bay (Note: Not to be confused with Chabad of South Bay Long Island)	Lomita	
Chabad of South Huntington Beach	Huntington Beach	
Chabad in South Westwood	Los Angeles	
Chabad at Stanford	Palo Alto	
Chabad of Stockton	Stockton	
Chabad of Studio City	Studio City, Los Angeles	
Chabad of Sunnyvale	Sunnyvale	
Chabad of Temecula	Temecula	
Chabad of Thousand Oaks	Thousand Oaks	
Chabad of Toluca Lake Jewish Center	Toluca Lake, Los Angeles	
Chabad of Topanga	Topanga	
Chabad of the Tri Valley	Pleasanton	
Chabad Jewish Center of Tustin	Tustin	
Rohr Chabad at UC Irvine (Note: UC is an abbreviation for University of California, here referring to its Irvine campus.)	Irvine	
Chabad at UCLA	Los Angeles	
Chabad Center of University City	San Diego	
Chabad of the Valley Headquarters	Tarzana, Los Angeles	
Chabad of Ventura	Ventura	
Chabad West Coast Headquarters	Los Angeles	
Chabad of WeHo West	Los Angeles	
Chabad of West Orange County	Huntington Beach	
Chabad of West Marin	Fairfax	
Chabad of Westwood	Los Angeles	
Chabad on the Ranch	Rancho Santa Fe	
