= Nariman House =

Building in Mumbai, India

Nariman House (Chabad house)
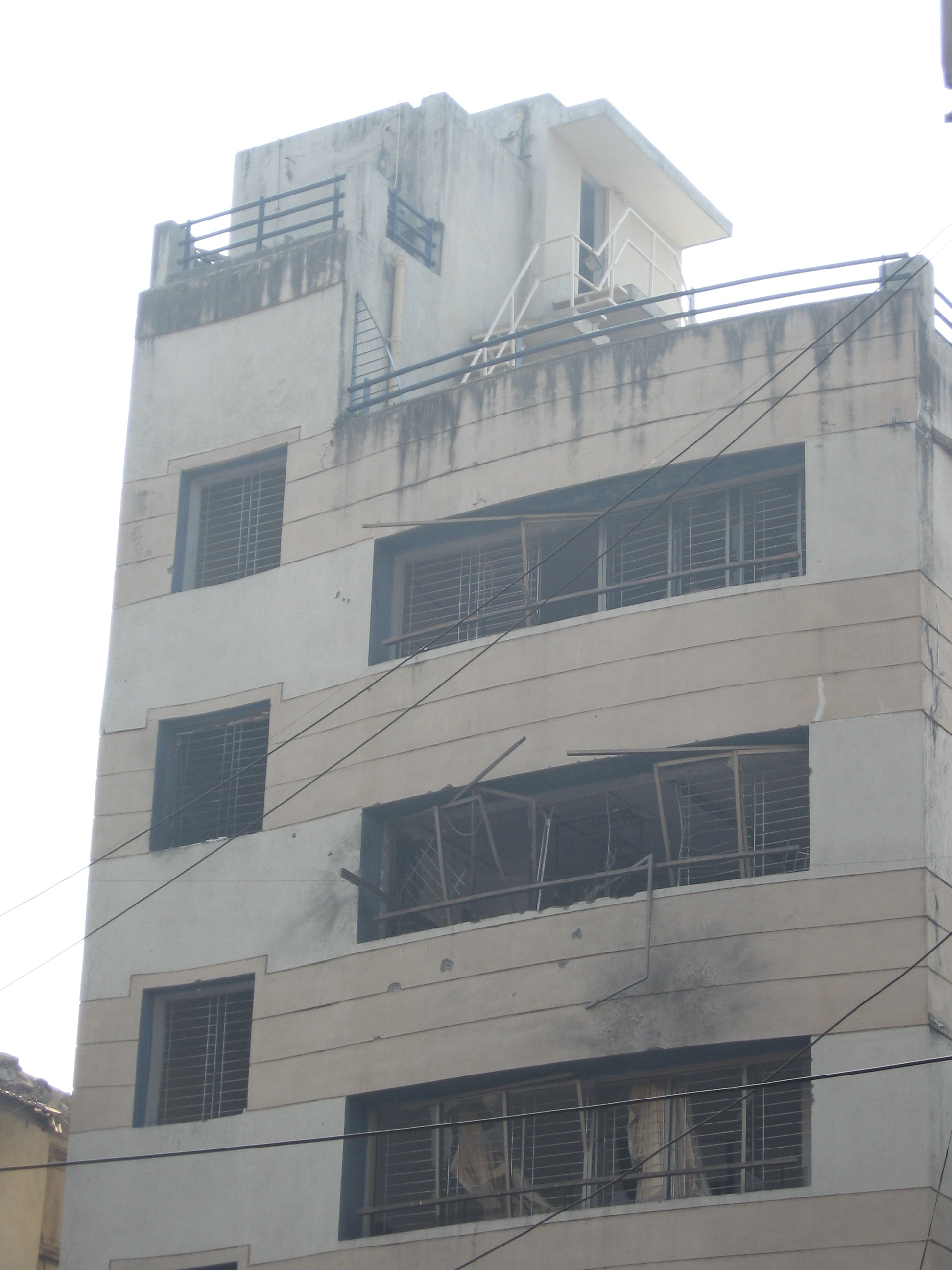
- Front view of the Nariman House a week after the 26/11 terrorist attack

- Location of the Chabad house in Mumbai

Religion
- Affiliation: Hasidic Judaism
- Ecclesiastical or organisational status: Synagogue; Chabad house
- Ownership: Chabad India Trust
- Status: Active

Location
- Location: 5 Hormusji Street, Colaba, Mumbai, Maharashtra
- Country: India
- Coordinates: 18°54′59″N 72°49′40″E

Architecture
- Style: Modernist
- Established: 2003 (as a congregation)
- Completed: 2006 (building)
- Elevation: 17 m (56 ft)

The Nariman House, designated as a Chabad house (Hebrew: בית חב"ד, romanized: Beit Chabad; Marathi: घरा नरिमन, romanized: Garā Narīman), is a five-storey landmark in the Colaba area of South Mumbai, Maharashtra, India. The building was home to a Chabad house, a Hasidic Jewish outreach centre run by Gavriel and Rivka Holtzberg, who had owned the building since around 2006. The centre had an educational center, a synagogue, offered drug prevention services, and a hostel. The building was one of the sites of the 2008 Mumbai attacks and six of its occupants, including Holtzberg and his wife, who was six months pregnant, were killed. Their two-year-old son Moshe Holtzberg survived the attack after being rescued by his Indian nanny, Sandra Samuel.

== Chabad House ==
The Chabad house, located at 5 Hormusji Street, Colaba, is one of eight synagogues in Mumbai and has been described as the epicentre of the Jewish community in the city.

It is one of 4,000 such houses in 73 countries, typically run by husband-and-wife couples. In 2003, this Chabad House, the first in Mumbai, was opened by Gavriel Holtzberg and Rivka Holtzberg, newly married and run by them. It catered to Israelis who were traveling to "party hotspots" such as Goa and Rajasthan, in addition to the city's local Jewish community and traveling Jewish businessmen. The Holtzbergs also ran a synagogue and taught Torah classes, in addition to the rabbi conducting weddings for local Jewish couples. It is the Chabad headquarters for Mumbai. Gavriel (born 1979, raised in Brooklyn, New York) and Rivka (born 1980 in Afula, Israel) Holtzberg came to Mumbai in 2003 after completing a mission in Thailand.

Three flights a week bring hundreds of Israeli travelers from Israel to Mumbai; in an interview, Holtzberg said he understood the nature of their needs. Born in Israel but having grown up in Brooklyn, Holtzberg said that the travelers "[needed] relief from the army, from work, from real life". He said, "they come here to do everything the army didn't allow them to do. Their shoes had to be polished and tied—here they wear sandals. They had to cut their hair—here they grow their hair long."

In addition, "Jews from all nationalities stopped there—primarily Israelis, but also those from Singapore and other places. It was almost like a second home to them," said Elijah Jacob, the American Jewish Joint Distribution Committee's country manager for India. "Our country director used to say it was like a second home to him because of all of the Jews there on Shabbat."

Holtzberg also helped some of the local synagogues to solicit for donations, do fundraising for the T'feret Israel Synagogue, in central Mumbai in Jacobs Circle, and helped build a Mikveh there. Also, he was officially a shochet, making chickens available to the local Jewish community, making challah for the community, and the couple was "available for the community," there to answer Halakhic principles of the local community.

Chabad officials said they were certain the Mumbai house would reopen, and within hours of news of the Holtzbergs' deaths, young Chabad couples from around the world offered to move to Mumbai to continue their work.

The Chabad House offered a broad range of services to the community.

== 2008 Mumbai attacks ==
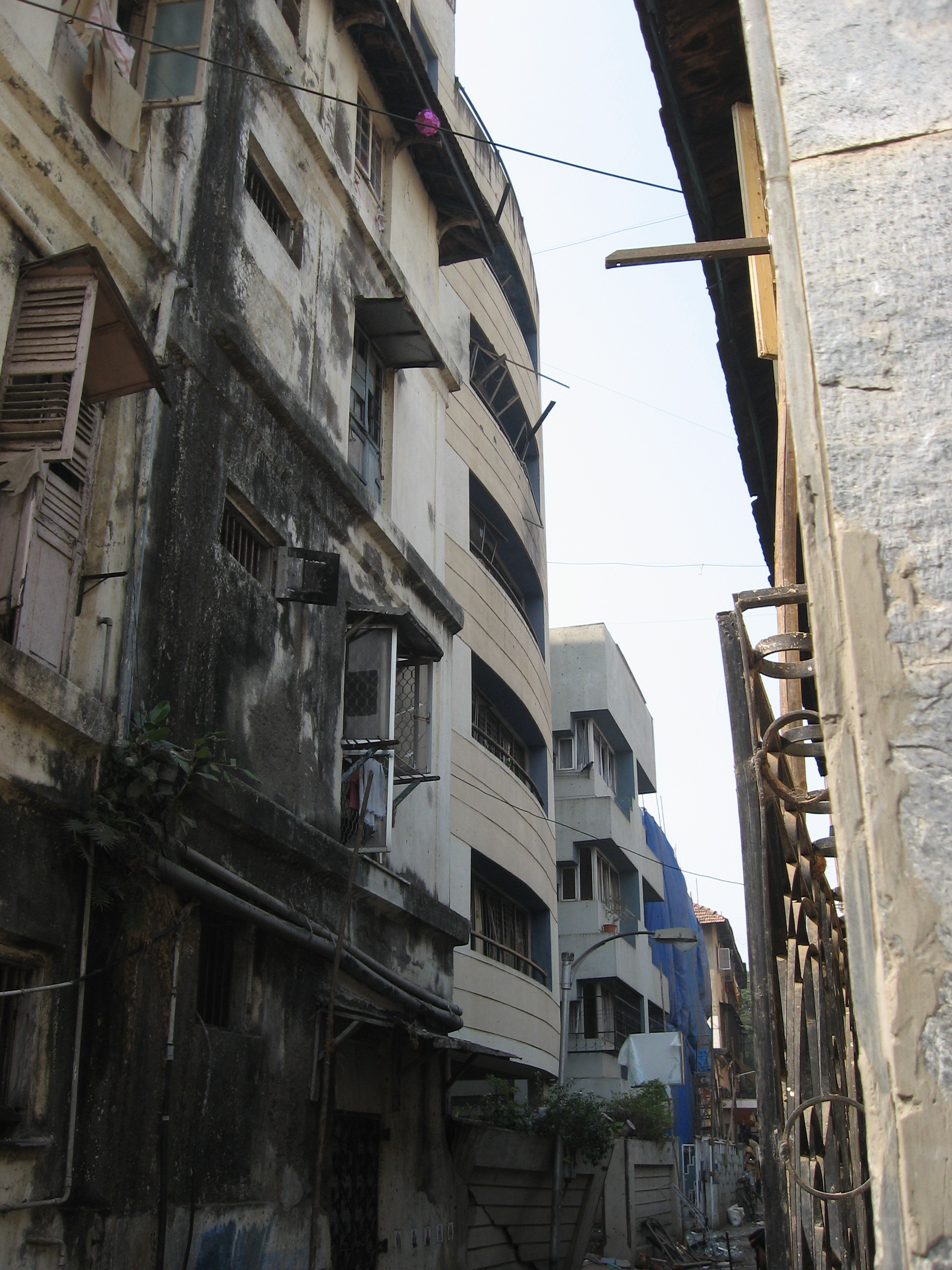
street in which Nariman House is located

Nariman House was seized and attacked during the 2008 Mumbai attacks. At around 21:45, on Wednesday, 26 November, two attackers named Babar Imran and Nasir (the oldest in the group of 9 at 28) launched an attack on the centre. Newscasters were calling it the "final assault". The building is near the Leopold Cafe, another establishment attacked during the strike. However, a later report alleged that Nariman House was actually the main target of the series of attacks and the rest of the targets were only to amplify the effect.

Initially it was reported that six Israeli Jews were being held hostage. Later, Chabad spokesman in Israel, Moni Ender, said that there were at least eight Israelis inside the house, including Rabbi Gavriel Holtzberg and his wife, Rivka. The rabbi's two-year-old son Moshe was rescued by his nanny, Sandra Samuel, who had worked for the centre for the previous five years. The hostages were allegedly tortured. Some of the victims had been bound.

It was reported that gunmen fired indiscriminately towards those present. Late on 27 November, unnamed Government of Maharashtra officials said that eight hostages had been released. Later, Israeli Foreign Ministry spokesman Yigal Palmor said that the eight people seen near Chabad House were not Jewish hostages but local Indians from a home in the same compound. Early on 28 November a large blast was heard at the centre as fighting continued, even though other sources were reporting that the building was under the control of Indian special forces.

During the siege U.S. Chabad official Rabbi Levi Shemtov talked with one of the attackers on Holtzberg's cell phone. The Federal Bureau of Investigation and other negotiation experts helped guide him through the process, which included around five phone calls. Having to find an Urdu speaker to speak with him, they were unable to directly speak to any of the hostages, but Shemtov did say he heard the voice of one woman screaming in English, "please help immediately."

Shortly before dawn, Indian special forces began an attack on Nariman House that lasted until after sundown. The operation began when 22 NSG Commandos rappelled out from an Indian Air Force Mi-17 helicopter on the roof of the building. NSG Commandos were in position in the adjacent buildings to provide cover fire to the assault team if needed. Commandos entered the building from the top and two loud blasts were heard followed by heavy gunfire. Most of the operation was broadcast live on television as news footage showed troops abseiling from a helicopter into the building and soldiers on the ground closing in. Initially it was reported that five hostages were killed, but it was later upgraded to six deaths, eight by Saturday morning after two missing Israelis made contact with the Israeli Foreign Ministry. When the raid ended at sundown everyone inside the building was dead, including the rabbi and his wife. An Indian commando, Gajender Singh Bisht, was killed during the operation. According to ZAKA members, at least one hostage, Holtzberg, might have been killed in the crossfire when the commandos moved in; this was rejected by government authorities as stories and irresponsible comments.

Some of the other hostages were killed by the attackers on the first night and the following day. Rivka Holtzberg and Yocheved Orpaz had been killed many hours before Nariman House was retaken.

A handout provided by Indian police identified the two attackers killed at Nariman House as Nasir (alias Abu Umar) and Babar Imaran.

=== Victims ===
The following is a list of the civilians who died:

Name	Age	Nationality
Rabbi Gavriel Holtzberg	29	Brooklyn, United States (and dual (Israel) Israeli citizenship)
Rebbetzin Rivka Holtzberg	28	Afula, Israel
Bentzion Kruman	26	Bat Yam, Israel (and dual (United States) US citizenship)
Rabbi Leibish Teitelbaum	37	Brooklyn, United States
Yoheved Orpaz	62	Givatayim, Israel
Norma Shvarzblat Rabinovich	50	Mexico

=== Reactions ===
"Gabi and Rivky Holtzberg made the ultimate sacrifice. As emissaries to Mumbai, Gabi and Rivky gave up the comforts of the West in order to spread Jewish pride in a corner of the world that was a frequent stop for throngs of Israeli tourists. Their Chabad House was popular among the local community, as well as with visiting business people. For five years, they ran a synagogue and Torah classes, and helped people dealing with drug addiction and poverty. Their selfless love will live on with all the people they touched. We will continue the work they started."

— Statement from Chabad-Lubavitch – Merkos L'Inyonei Chinuch, the educational arm of Chabad-Lubavitch.

=== Memorial ===
In 2018 the Nariman House was renamed Nariman Light House. Ten years after the Mumbai attacks, a memorial was opened at Nariman House, to commemorate the victims. The first phase was to place a plaque on the building's roof, listing all the names of the victims. In the second phase, the entire flooring of the fifth floor, in which Rabbi Gavriel lived with his wife Rivka and son Moshe, was painted white so it should look like it was 10 years before the attack.

== See also ==
- History of the Jews in India
- List of synagogues in India
- Sarah Avraham, an athlete and friend of the Holtzbergs who converted to Judaism following their death
