= Chabad house =

Religious outreach centres operated by the Chabad movement of Hasidic Judaism

A Chabad house is a center for disseminating Hasidic Judaism by the Chabad movement. Chabad houses are run by a Chabad married couple; shaliach (emissary) and shalucha (fem. for "emissary"). They are located in cities and on or near college campuses.

== History ==
Menachem Mendel Schneerson (the Chabad rebbe) sent Rabbi Shlomo Cunin to Los Angeles in 1965 to lay the groundwork for Chabad's West Coast activities. The first Chabad house for university students was opened in March 1969 at the University of California, Los Angeles by Cunin.

In 1972, Cunin opened additional Chabad houses at the University of California, Berkeley and University of California, San Diego, and, by 2003, had overseen the establishment of nearly 100 Chabad houses in California.

Chabad houses are independently funded by the local community (apart from those in tourist destinations or Asian business hubs).

== Description ==
In a Chabad house, the shaliach (a Chabad rabbi) and shalucha (his wife) host programs, activities, and services for the local Jewish community and tourists.

Chabad centers exist around the world and serve as Jewish community centers that provide educational and outreach activities for the entire Jewish community regardless of degree of observance. Each center aims to provide a cozy and informal place to learn about and observe Judaism, and provides an atmosphere such that all Jews feel comfortable at Chabad events. Some are in or very near college campuses, others are not.

Chabad houses are typically run by a rabbi and his wife—often with the assistance of unmarried young men or women affiliated with Chabad, or, in the case of more developed Chabad houses, with the assistance of a second or even third married couple.

== Services ==
Some typical Chabad house programs include: hospital and prison visits; holiday activities such as "Sukkah Mobiles," Chanukah and Purim gift baskets and kits, holiday rallies and festivals; counseling and social Services; Jewish studies classes, lectures and seminars; Judaica services; regular newspapers and kosher meals. Classes may also be provided for non-Jews in the Noahide laws, as per rabbi Schneerson's Noahide campaign.

== In universities ==
Chabad houses at universities—known as Chabad on Campus—often provide housing for students, peer counseling and drug prevention centers, student activity offices, a synagogue, a publications center, library, kosher dining hall, student lounges, and a computer area. These facilities provide a social environment for young Jewish men and women on campus.

== Gallery ==
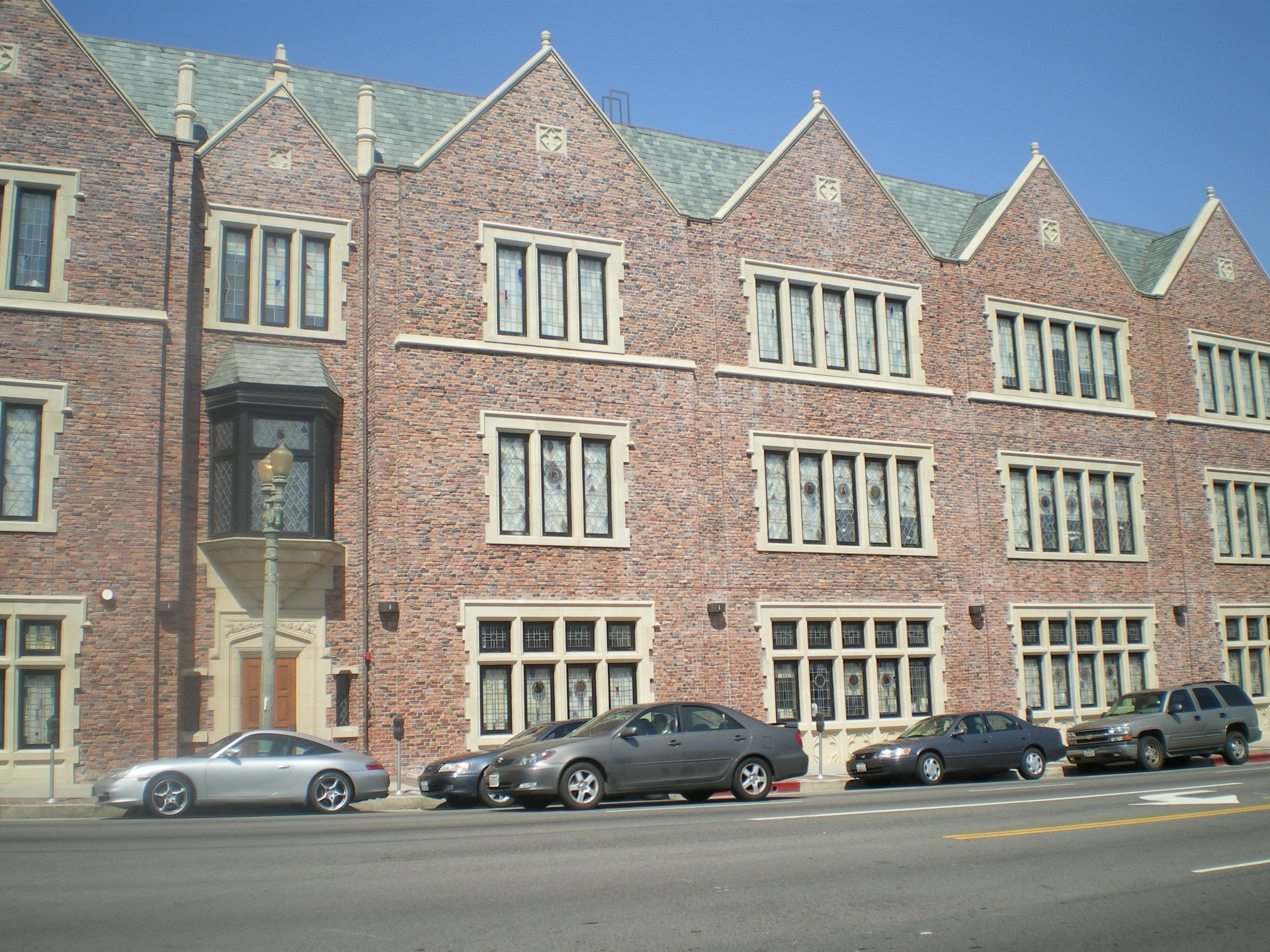
Chabad Bais Sonia Gutte Campus, Los Angeles.

Chabad of Boca Raton, Florida.

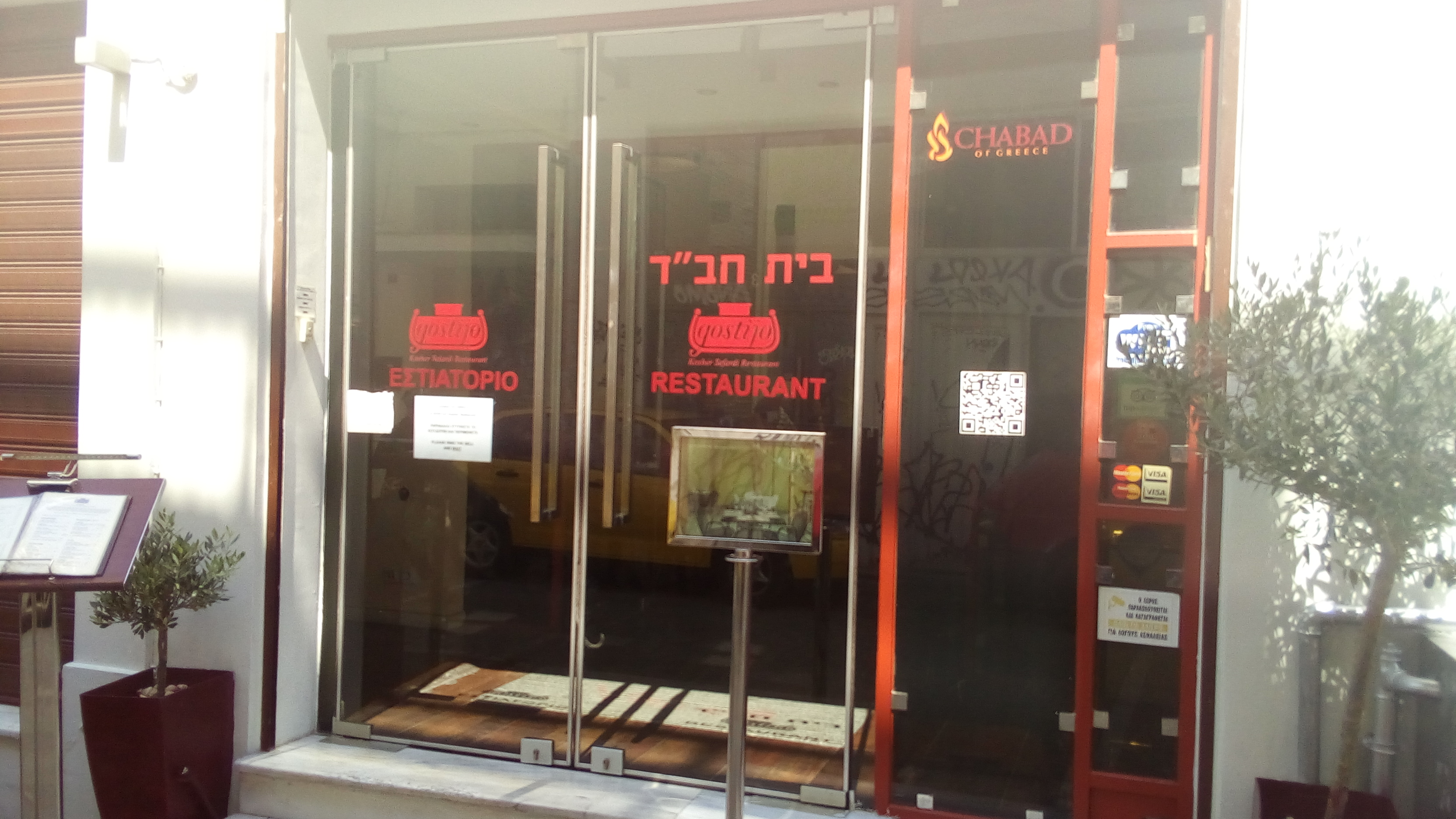
Chabad House, in Athens

== See also ==
- Baal teshuva
- Chabad of Poway
- Jewish fundamentalism
- Nariman House
- Orthodox Judaism outreach
- Soho Synagogue
- Yeshiva Gedolah Frankfurt

== Notes ==
=== Sources ===
- Fishkoff, Sue (2003). The Rebbe's Army: Inside the world of Chabad-Lubavitch. New York: Schocken Books. ISBN 0-8052-1138-1.
