= List of places named after Chabad =

This is a list of places named after the Chabad-Lubavitch movement, the Rebbes of Chabad and other Chabad terms.

== United States ==
- Chabad Way, (co-named section of Armory Ave), Champaign, Illinois
- Chabad Way, Palmetto Bay, Florida
- Lubavitch City, Tustin, Michigan (Campgrounds of Camp Gan Israel Detroit)
- Lubavitcher Rebbe Way, (co-named section of Glenwood Ave), Cincinnati, Ohio
- Lubavitcher Rebbe Way, (co-named section of President Street), Brooklyn, New York
- Rebbetzin Chaya Mushka Schneerson Square, (co-named section of Lefferts Avenue), Brooklyn, New York
- Schneerson Square, (co-named section of Pico Boulevard), Los Angeles, California
- Tomchei Temimim Way, (co-named section of Crown Street), Brooklyn, New York

== Israel ==
=== Villages and neighborhoods ===
- Kfar Chabad
- Kfar Chabad Bet (Note: (sister village/expansion of Kfar Chabad))
- Nachalat Menachem, Kiryat Malakhi
- Nachlat Har Chabad, Kiryat Malakhi
- Shikun Chabad, Jerusalem
- Shikun Chabad, Lod
- Kiryat Chabad, Safed

=== Streets ===
- Chabad Street, Beitar Illit
- Chabad Street, Haifa
- Chabad Street, Herzliya
- Chabad Street, Lod
- Chabad Street, Migdal HaEmek
- Chabad Street, Netanya
- Chabad Street, Old City of Jerusalem
- Chabad Street, Rehovot
- Chabad Street, Rishon LeZion
- Chabad Street, Jaffa
- HaRav MiLubavitch Street, Lod

==== Kfar Chabad street names ====
The vast majority of streets in Kfar Chabad are named after Chabad Rebbes, texts and concepts.

===== Names =====
- Baal Shem Tov Street
- Admor HaZaken Street
- Admor HaEmtzai Street
- Tzemach Tzedek Street
- Admor HaMaharash Street
- Admor HaRashab Street
- Admor HaRayatz Street
- Rebbe MiLubavitch Street
- Rebbetzin Chana Street
- Rabbi Levi Yitzchok Street

===== Texts =====
- Sefer HaTanya Street
- Likutei Torah Street
- Torat Chaim Street
- Torat Menachem Street
- Likutei Sichot Street
- Igrot Kodesh Street
- HaYom Yom Street
- Samech Vov Street
- Basi LeGani Street

===== Concepts =====
- HaShlichut Street
- HaGeulah Street
- Didan Notzach Street
- Ma’aleh 770 Street
- Tzeirei Agudas Steet
- Kikar Hashluchim

== Ukraine ==
- Menachem Mendel Schneerson Street, Dnipro
- Derech Lubavitch, Lyubavichi
- Chabad Street, Lyubavichi
- Schneersohn Road, Lyubavichi

== Brazil ==
- Praça Rebe de Lubavitch, Leblon, Rio de Janeiro

== Austria ==
- Rabbiner-Schneerson-Platz, Brigittenau, Vienna

== See also ==
Lyubavichi, Rudnyansky District, Smolensk Oblast, the place Chabad-Lubavitch is named after.
