= Dvar Malchus =

Chabad-Lubavitch weekly Torah study publication

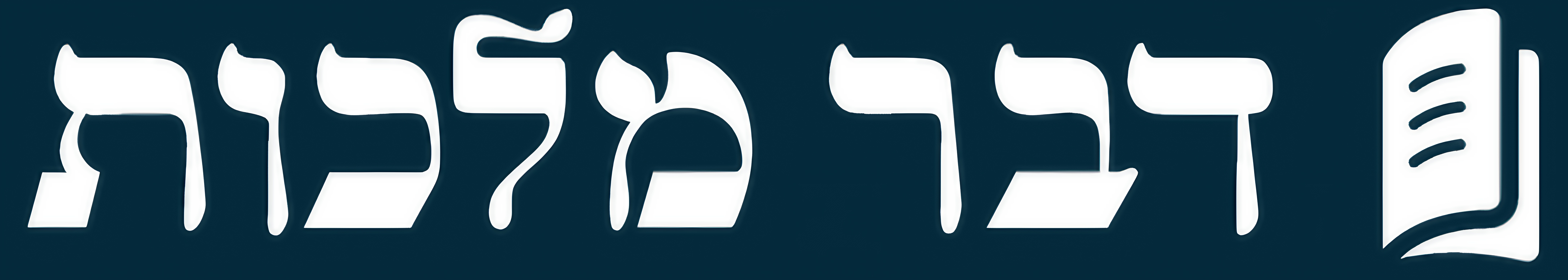

- Cover of a Dvar Malchus publication for Parshat Lech-Lecha dated November 3–9, 2024
- Categories: Chabad-Lubavitch Hassidism
- Frequency: weekly
- Founded: 1991
- First issue: April 29, 1991
- Company: Kehot
- Country: Israel
- Based in: Kfar Habad
- Language: Biblical Hebrew Hebrew and Aramaic
- Website: https://dvarmalchus.org

Dvar Malchus or Devar Malchut (Hebrew: דְּבַר מַלְכוּת Ashkenazi pronunciation: d'var malkhus [də.'vaɾ 'mal.xʊs], Modern Hebrew: dəvar malkhût [dəˈvaʁ malˈχut] lit. 'a royal word') is a Torah study publication distributed weekly on topics related to Chabad Hasidism, the core of which is made up of Maamarim (religious discourses), Sichos (talks) and other religious material drawn from the work of Menachem Mendel Schneerson, the seventh Rebbe of Chabad-Lubavitch. Other materials in the publication include daily lessons in Chitas (acronym for Pentateuch, Psalms, Tanya), Maimonides and Hayom Yom.

The publication is distributed weekly at 70,000 copies to subscribers and institutions, and is available for use and download on the Internet and on a dedicated mobile application. In peak years, the publication was printed at 150,000 copies and distributed in train stations and at central intersections in Israel. Publications in this format are translated into different languages and printed every week around the world. The initiator of the publication is Rabbi Tovia Peles.

== History ==
On the tenth of Tevet 5751 (1991), in the words given by Rabbi Menachem Mendel Schneerson to his followers, he referred to rabbis in Israel who were concerned with condemning non-religious Jews, and explained that such an occupation is not acceptable and even contrary to the requirements of Judaism. Following this, Rabbi Tovia Peles of Kfar Chabad decided to publish this message in Israel, distributing thousands of copies of a printout of the talk throughout the country that eventually appeared in the Kfar Chabad newspaper.

From this time he began to regularly publish the weekly new Torah material of the Lubavitcher Rebbe in a publication called "Dvar Malchus".

After several weeks, the Rebbe ordered the publishing team to negotiate with the management of the official Chabad-Lubavitch publishing house, Kehot Publication Society, so that the booklet could be published officially.

On 12 Iyar 5751 (1991), Rabbi Menachem Mendel Schneerson distributed to the audience in his Beit Midrash the booklet 'Dvar Malchus'. The publication included talks from the Rebbe about matters relating to the Messiah in the work of the Rambam. The publication was released on the occasion of the anniversary of his brother, Rabbi Israel Aryeh Leib Schneerson.

Even after the Rebbe's passing, Rabbi Peles continued to publish the publication in a weekly format and included in it the talks of the Rebbe on Torah topics and material from the Rebbe's meetings from previous years, in accordance with the progression of the Hebrew calendar.

In 2005, lessons for the learning schedule Chitas were also added to the publication, in 2006 work by the Rambam was added, and in 2007 a weekly schedule was added to the publication, including relevant calculations pertaining to religious observance. In 2017 material from Hayom Yom, another learning schedule, was added to the regular publication of the booklet. During these years Dvar Malchus began to be distributed in tens of thousands of copies for free all over Israel according to great demand for the publication, and so the publication began to be released in larger quantities.

At the end of 2021, a special edition of the publication was distributed temporarily on weekends to subscribers of the newspapers Makor Rishon, Israel Hayom, Yedioth Ahronoth, and the Jerusalem Post.

== Circulation ==
For many years, the tycoon Lev Avnerovich Leviev has been contributing to the booklet's printing and distribution. Leviev is close to Chabad Hasidism and Tovia Peles. His name and surname appear at the end of the publication.

In 2013, the publication began to be sold at a subsidized amount and its circulation decreased from roughly 150 thousand copies to roughly 70 thousand copies per week. In the same year, a private company, Dvar Malchus Limited, was opened. Since the private company's opening, it has been coordinating the entire publishing operation. The publication is edited by Hazak Publishing Limited.

The publication is widely distributed and used, and was cited by Elyakim Rubinstein in a ruling by the Supreme Court of Israel.

== Name ==
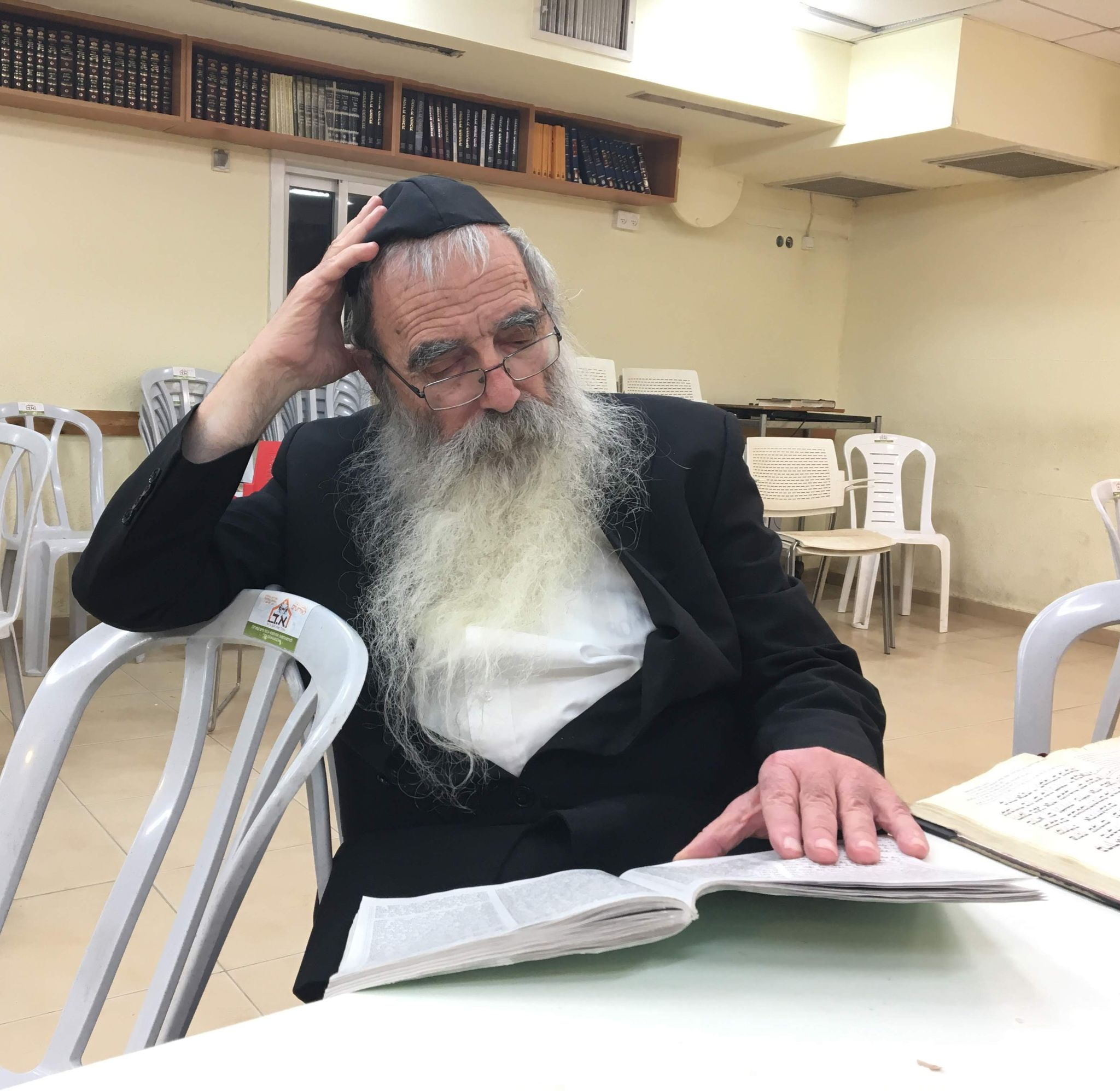
Rabbi Tovia Peles, founder of the Dvar Malchus publication, studies from a release of the booklet.

The expression "dvar malchus" (word of the kingdom) appears in the Book of Esther: "The word of the kingdom came out of his mouth," and it is used in the Talmud to refer to "matters of the kingdom". The words of the great men of Israel are metaphorically also called "kingdom", based on the words of the Talmud: "Who are the kings? The disciples of the sages." There is also a practice of opening or ending a sermon, book or letter with a quote from the words of the sages according to the teaching in the Talmud suggesting teachings should be "opening with a word of the kingdom." The sixth Rebbe of Chabad, Yosef Yitzchak Schneerson, called the religious material written by his predecessors by this name. Following this, there is a Chabad practice to call the Rebbe's teachings in general by this title.

Rabbi Tovia Peles took the name of the publication from a section in the newspaper Kfar Chabad Weekly where a relevant discourse from the Rebbe would be presented; this column was also called Dvar Malchus.

== Contents ==
- Maamarim (Hasidic essays) - by the Lubavitcher Rebbe with possible commentary.
- Likkutei Sichos (collected talks) - according to the weekly study cycle.
- Tavedevyot - sacred conversations that the Rebbe gave to his followers.
- Talks from Levi Yitzchak: On the Torah - Kabbalistic annotations by Rabbi Levi Yitzchak Schneerson.
- Chumash (pentateuch) - with Rashi's and Nachmanides' commentary on the Torah.
- Tanya (book by Shneur Zalman of Liadi) with commentary from the book 'Lessons in Sefer HaTanya'
- Hayom Yom (lit. "today's day") - daily proverbs by the Lubavitcher Rebbe.
- Sefer Hamitzvot (Daily laws) in a lesson of work by Maimonides.
- Mishneh Torah (work by Maimonides) - divided into daily lessons, within the framework of 'three chapters per day', 'one chapter per day' and the Sefer HaMitzvot with Maimonides's interpretation, from Mossad HaRav Kook .
- Nevi'im (Prophets) and Ketuvim (Scriptures) - with interpretations.
- Mishnah (Oral Torah) - with interpretations.
- Igrot Kodesh (lit. "Holy Letters") - a collection of letters from the Chabad Rebbe .
- Daf Yomi (daily page of Talmud) - with commentary by Rabbi Adin Steinsaltz.
- Words of the Chabad Rebbeim - the teachings of the Admorim of Chabad.
- Reading the Torah - with novel Torah elucidations on the weekly parsha.
- The Haftara- with the commentaries "Shai LaMorah" and "Ateret Miriam".
- This week's schedule - with sunrise times, the end of Shema reading times, the end of the prayer times, sunset, nightfall, and the time Shabbat enters in many cities around the world.
