= Zalman I. Posner =

American rabbi and writer

- זלמן פוזנר
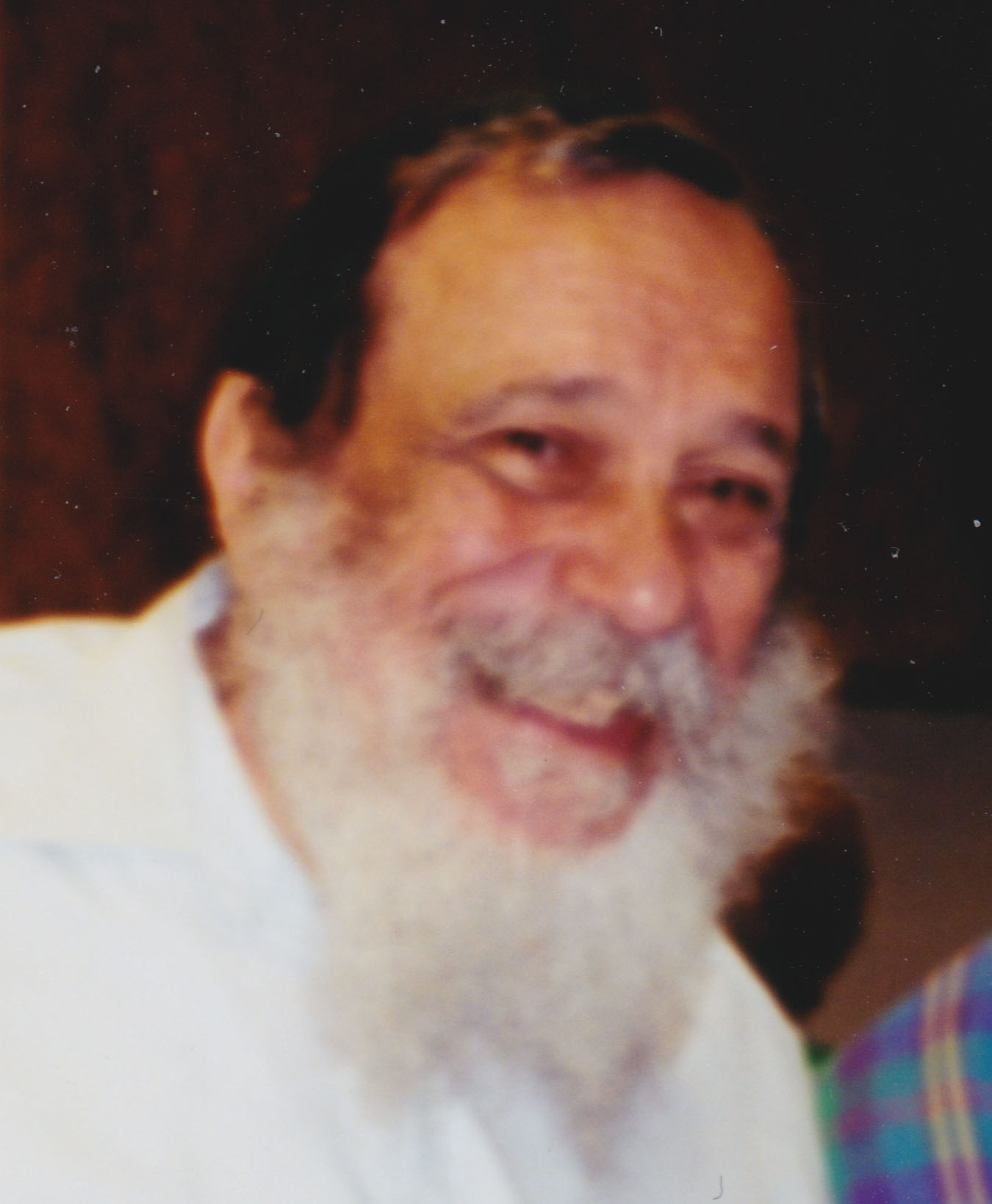
- Posner in 2004
- Born: 1927; Mandatory Palestine
- Died: April 23, 2014 (aged 86–87); Rancho Mirage, California, U.S.
- Occupations: Rabbi, Congregation Sherith Israel
- Notable work: Think Jewish (Kesher Press)
- Spouse: Risya Kazarnovsky
- Parents: Sholom Posner (father); Chaya Posner (mother)

Rabbi Zalman I. Posner (Hebrew: זלמן פוזנר; 1927–April 23, 2014) was an American rabbi and writer associated with the Chabad-Lubavitch Hasidic movement. Posner served as a congregational rabbi and community leader in the American Southeast for five decades, serving the Orthodox congregation Sherith Israel and founding an Orthodox Day School both in Nashville, Tennessee.

== Activities ==
In early 1948, Posner was sent as a shaliach ("emissary") to DP camps and Jewish communities in Europe for education work. On his return to the States, he became the principal of the Yeshiva in Springfield, Massachusetts.

In September 1949, Posner and his wife Risya came to Nashville, Tennessee, as the first Chabad emissaries to the state, a position they held for 53 years. In 1954, they founded the Akiva School in Nashville. In September 1957, Posner assumed deanship of the Yeshiva Achei Tmimim of Pittsburgh, Pennsylvania, founded by his parents. Despite his out-of-state duties, he continued to guide the Jewish community of Nashville as Rabbi and Principal of the Akiva Day School for many years.

=== Works ===
Posner's main written work is his book on Judaism in modern life titled Think Jewish and published by Kesher Press in 1979 and republished in 2002. His other authored work concerns the weekly portion of the Hebrew Bible, titled Reflections on the Sedra.

Posner also served as a translator for the Chabad publishing house Kehot. His translations and works of commentary include HaYom Yom and Tanya (Bilingual Edition: Parts III and V), as well as other works of Hasidic thought.

=== Views ===
Within the Chabad movement, there is a debate concerning the population estimate of the Chabad movement in the United States prior to World War Two. While some figures in the community proposed a higher estimate based on assumed migration patterns from Russia to the USA, Posner rejected the stance and opined that a projected figure of the pre-war Chabad community in North America of 160,000 members was overinflated.

Posner was also critical of contemporary sociological studies of Hasidic Jews. Posner deemed such studies as lacking in that they presented a portrait of religious communities which appeared as highly focused on traditional observance of Jewish ritual. The critique concerned the expected lack of framing that most religious practices of Hasidic Jews were also the religious practices of other observant Jews. For Posner, sociological studies are inadequate means through which the religious fervor of Hasidic prayer or the intimate bond between the Hasidic Rebbe and Hasid can be explained.

== Personal life ==
Zalman Posner's parents were Rabbi Sholom and Chaya Posner, who served as longtime Chabad emissaries in Pittsburgh, Pennsylvania. As a member of the Chabad community in the United States in the early twentieth century, Posner was one of the first yeshiva students trained at the Lubavitch Yeshiva in Brooklyn which was established in 1940 and opened in 1941. His wife Risya Posner predeceased him in 2007. Posner died in Rancho Mirage, California on April 23, 2014.

== See also ==
- Congregation Sherith Israel (Nashville, Tennessee)
- Chabad-Lubavitch
