= A Chassidisher Derher =

Monthly Hassidic Magazine

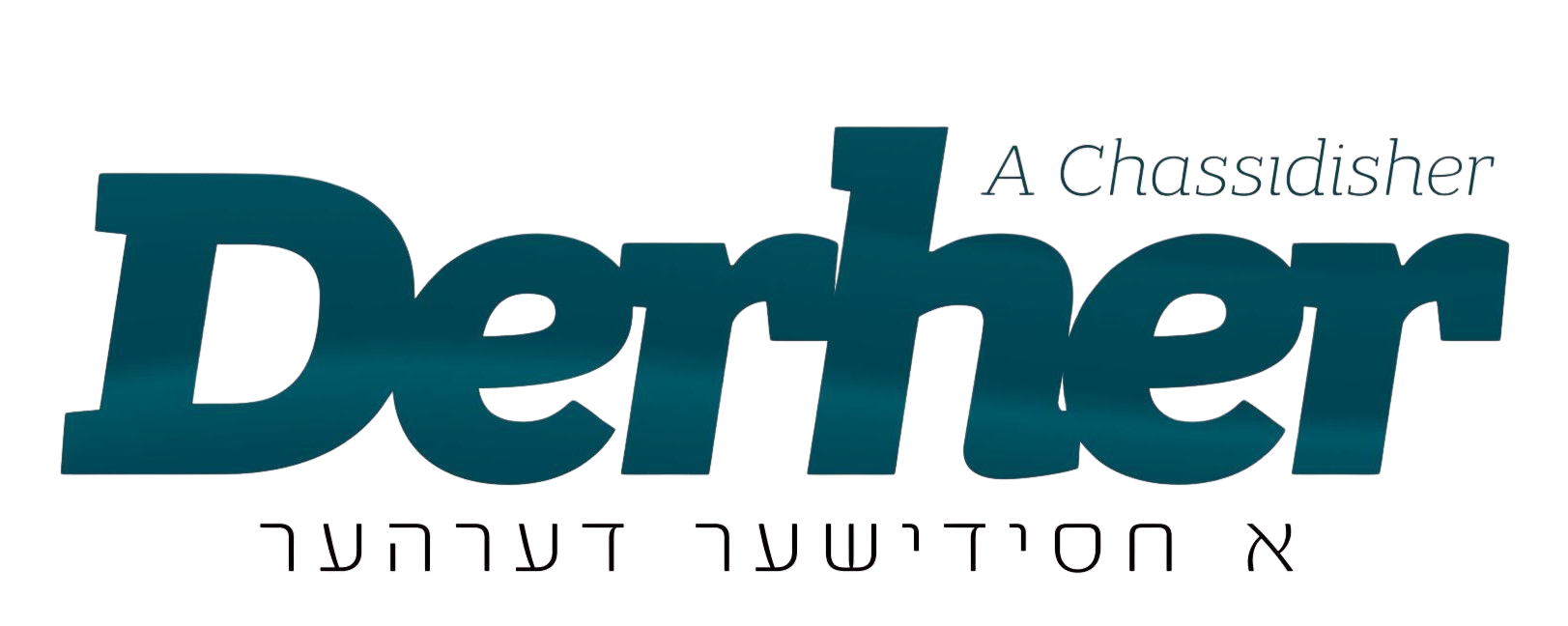

- A Chassidisher Derher Issue 144 (221) July 2024
- Director: Rabbi Yossi Kamman
- Editor in chief: Rabbi Mendel Jacobs
- Managing Editor: Rabbi Yankel Bergstein
- Administrator: Rabbi Levi Weg
- Categories: Hassidism
- Frequency: Monthly
- Founder: Rabbi Tzvi Altein
- Founded: November 2010
- First issue: December 2010
- Company: Vaad Talmidei Hatmimim Haolami
- Country: United States
- Based in: Brooklyn, New York
- Language: English
- Website: https://derher.org

A Chassidisher Derher (Yiddish: א חסידישע דערהער a ha si di sher der her /a χaˈsidɪʃə dɛrˈhɛr/ lit. 'A hassidic perception') Is a nonprofit subscription based monthly magazine published by Vaad Talmidei Hatmimim Haolami. It features articles, photographs, and interviews related to Chassidic history and the Lubavitcher Rebbe, and the activities of the Chabad-Lubavitch movement. The magazine is primarily aimed at the English-speaking Chabad community.

== History ==
The first issue of A Chassidisher Derher was introduced in black-and-white format and distributed in Chabad yeshivot in January 2011. The inaugural issue, released on January 29, 2011 (24 Shevat, 5771), contained four pages. For nearly a year, the publication maintained this format, until November 12, 2011 (12 Cheshvan, 5772), when the Vaad Talmidei Hatmimim Ha’olami (World Board of Talmidim) was officially designated as the organization overseeing the magazine.

In December 2011, the magazine expanded to include a 24-page color edition, incorporating rare photographs of the Lubavitcher Rebbe. Following this milestone, the magazine operated as a weekly publication for two years, featuring extended editions during major Chabad holidays. By 2013, it transitioned to a monthly format, which it maintains to this day.

By 2022, Chassidisher Derher had grown significantly in scope, reaching thousands of subscribers across the United States and many Chabad communities worldwide. Its content was also made widely accessible in 2021 with the launch of a comprehensive online archive and index of its articles.

The magazine collaborates with Jewish Educational Media (JEM), leveraging their extensive photo archives of the Lubavitcher Rebbe to enhance its visual content.

== See also ==
- 19 Kislev
- Chayenu
- Dvar Malchus
- Education and Sharing Day
- Shtetl (publication)
- Yosef Yitzchak Schneersohn
