= Talmud Torah Chabad Migdal HaEmek =

Location
- Chabad Street 13, Migdal HaEmek, 10552 Israel

Information
- School type: Haredi State Education
- Religious affiliation: Chabad
- Educational Director: Rabbi Menachem Mendel Donin
- Grades: K-8
- Gender: Male

Talmud Torah Chabad Migdal HaEmek is a Chabad Lubavich Ultra orthodox all boys Talmud Torah in Migdal HaEmek, Israel. The school type is considered state-religious (Mamlachti dati) as of 2009, when the school joined the New Horizon educational initiative by the Ministry of Education (Israel). The school was founded in 1992 and is currently active. As of 2017, enrollment was at 274.

== Events ==
The school hosts a once a year oral memorization of Mishnayot and Tanya and the Gemara campaign as part of the Oheli Yosef Yitzchak Network. Students memorize and are then tested. The campaign concludes with an awards ceremony held at the Migdal HaEmek Community Center.
