= Congregation Sherith Israel (Nashville, Tennessee) =

Orthodox synagogue

- Hebrew: שארית ישראל
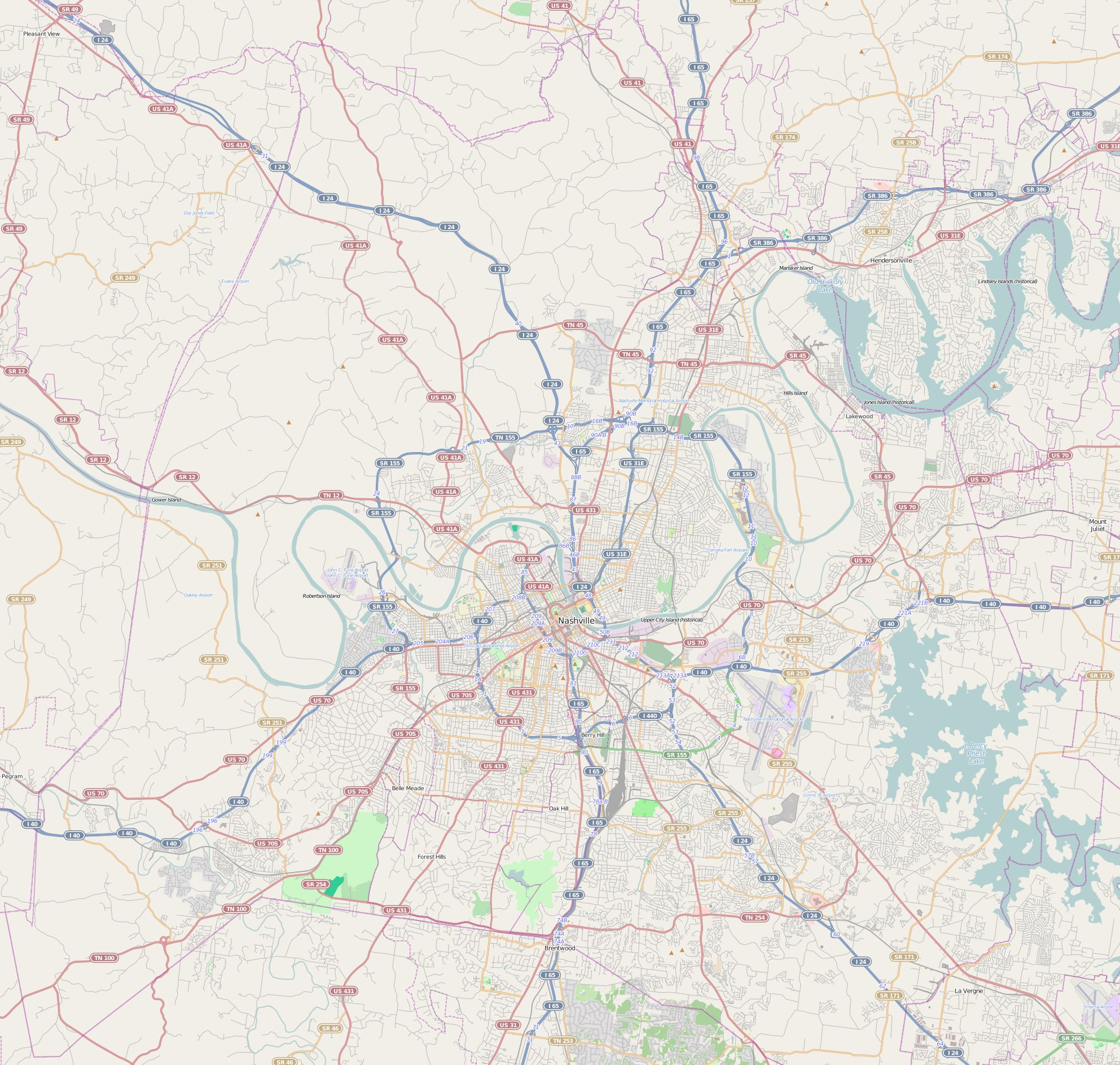
- Location in Nashville

Religion
- Affiliation: Orthodox Judaism
- Ecclesiastical or organisational status: Synagogue
- Leadership: Rabbi Saul Strosberg
- Status: Active

Location
- Location: 3600 West End Avenue, Nashville, Tennessee
- Country: United States
- Coordinates: 36°08′06″N 86°49′33″W

Architecture
- Established: 1887
- Completed: 1905 (Fifth Avenue); 1948 (West End Avenue)

Website
- sherithisrael.com

Congregation Sherith Israel (Note: In some early synagogue documents, the name was spelled "Shearith", which reflects the presence of the aleph (א) in Hebrew: שארית, lit. 'Sherith') (Hebrew: שארית ישראל, romanized: Sherith Israel, lit. 'Remnant of Israel') is an Orthodox synagogue located at 3600 West End Avenue, Nashville, Tennessee, in the United States. The congregation is led by Rabbi Saul Strosberg.

== History ==
Sherith Israel has its beginnings in 1887, when it was a Hungarian congregation organized by the Hungarian Benevolent Society of Nashville.

In 1904, another congregation called Adath Israel declared itself as a Conservative congregation, making the Hungarian synagogue the only Orthodox congregation in Nashville. Wedge issues like mixed-gender seating encouraged many from Adath Israel to join the Hungarian congregation. The following year, it adopted the name "Sherith Israel."

Soon afterwards, the congregation purchased a building on Fifth Avenue for use as a synagogue. Since it was next to the Ryman Auditorium, home to the Grand Ole Opry, there was some humorous confusion as country music fans walked in by mistake, and began listening to the Hebrew prayer service instead.

== The synagogue building ==
The current building at 3600 West End Avenue dates from 1948, and it has been upgraded and augmented since. It now has a mikvah, a social hall, a large and small sanctuary, and separate kitchens for meat and dairy kosher cooking. Sherith Israel offers adult classes in Hebrew and Scripture and has a daily minyan for prayer services three times a day every day of the year, excepting Sabbath and Holidays when extra services are added. An eruv surrounds the local community.

The main sanctuary is used for Sabbath and Holiday services, and often is also used during the week. It has stained-glass windows specially commissioned for the building, each depicting a scene from the Torah. Large, back-lit sculptures depicting the Two Tablets of the Covenant flank the ark in the front of the sanctuary. There are two sections for women that flank the recessed area for men in the center of the room. In addition, a women's balcony in the rear overlooks the room. Mechitzas about 5 feet (1.5 m) high separate the male and female sections of the room.

The small sanctuary doubles as a classroom, and holds many tables for this purpose. It also contains part of the synagogue's library, its walls covered in bookshelves. There is an ark in this room, and a large reading table from which to read the Torah scrolls.

== Leadership ==
Rabbi Zalman I. Posner, who arrived in Nashville in 1949, was a shaliach, or emissary, of the sixth Lubavitcher Rebbe, Yosef Yitzchok Schneersohn. He and his wife, Rebbetzin Risya Posner, served as the spiritual leaders of the synagogue for many years. A small sample of Rabbi Posner's sermons appear in his book Reflections on the Sedra. He is a well-known Chasidic authority world-wide, and has authored, edited, and translated many works, including Think Jewish (author), the Tanya (translator, two parts of five), and the Hebrew-English Nusach HaAri Siddur published by Kehot (editor). Before his retirement from Sherith Israel, he gave classes about the Tanya, the weekly Torah portion, the Talmud, and how the modern world is placed in the realm of Jewish tradition.

Cantor George Lieberman, an active leader and teacher of the congregation today, joined the synagogue in March 1996. Trained at the Yeshiva University Cantorial School, Cantor Lieberman continues to serve as the congregation's baal korei, or Torah scroll reader, and to lead Sabbath and Holiday services for the congregation. He also teaches Hebrew, prepares children for bar mitzvah and bat mitzvah, and gives adult-level classes about the weekly portion in the Torah. In addition, he has taught classes about the Kitzur Shulchan Aruch (a famous code of Jewish law) and Midrash (a collection of traditional allegories that frequently flesh out details in the Torah), and many other topics.

Saul Strosberg was appointed rabbi of Congregation Sherith Israel in 2005. He is a graduate of Yeshiva University and has ordination from Yeshivat Chovevei Torah. Under his leadership, Sherith Israel's membership grew from 140 families to over 200.

== Akiva School ==
The Congregation Sherith Israel synagogue location was also the original site of the Akiva Jewish Day School, which Rabbi Zalman I. Posner founded in 1954. In 1999, Akiva School moved to the Gordon Jewish Community Center at 801 Percy Warner Blvd. The classrooms on the ground floor are now used by the Sherith Israel Sunday School program for children. Additionally, a portion of the space in the "ladies' balcony" above the sanctuary on the third floor was partitioned and converted into classrooms. The space has since been reclaimed for the balcony during the renovations from 2008-09.

== Notable members ==
- Amy-Jill Levine
