= Chayenu =

Jewish weekly Torah study publication

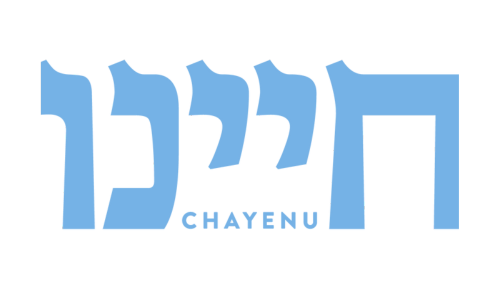

- Chayenu publication cover for parashat Vayeira; October 29-November 4 2023 (14-20 Cheshvan 5783)
- Editor: Yosef Yarmush
- Categories: Torah study
- Frequency: weekly
- Circulation: 35,000
- Publisher: Yossi Pels
- Founder: Michoel Goldman, Louis Pearlman, Mendel Goldman
- Founded: 2009
- First issue: Parshat Naso 2009
- Company: Chayenu, Inc.
- Country: United States
- Based in: Brooklyn, New York
- Language: Biblical Hebrew and English
- Website: https://chayenu.org

Chayenu (Hebrew: חַיֵּינוּ Ḥa-Yē-Nū χaˈjɛnu lit. 'our life') is a weekly subscription-based publication dedicated to facilitating daily Torah study through established learning cycles founded in 2009 in Brooklyn, New York, specifically targeting individuals engaged in the study of Chitas, an acronym for Chumash, Tehillim, and Tanya. Chayenu is published by the nonprofit company Chayenu, Inc.

== History ==
The emphasis on daily Torah study, particularly the study of Chitas, was initiated by Chabad's Frierdiker Rebbe, Rabbi Yosef Yitzchak Schneersohn. In the 1960s, the Lubavitcher Rebbe, Rabbi Menachem Mendel Schneersohn called for a widespread campaign to encourage Jews in and out of the Chabad-Lubavich movement to engage in daily study of Chitas. on Shabbat in the year 1967 (5727), the Lubavitcher Rebbe emphasized the importance of Chitas as well as introducing study of Mishneh Torah, a work created by Maimonides.

In 2009 Chayenu was established by Mendel Goldman and Louis Perlman, who aimed to make Chitas Mishneh Torah and other daily study cycles study more accessible by creating weekly booklets and translating segments into English.

On October 19, 2016, the Chayenu mobile app was released serving as a digital extension of the weekly Chayenu publication, providing users with the same content as the printed format without the weekly subscription.

== Contents ==
Chitas this consists of three components:

1. The Chumach (Pentateuch) Cycle: A one-year cycle of 54 weekly Parshiot (sections of the Pentateuch) and additional sections for Jewish holidays and fast days, with seven daily aliyot (sections of the Parsha) read at the end of each week on Shabbat and the previous week on Monday and Thursday.
2. The Tehillim (Psalms) Cycle: A monthly cycle containing 30 daily readings of Psalms, usually read after the Jewish morning prayer.
3. The Tanya Cycle: A one-year cycle of sections from the book of Tanya, compiled by Shneur Zalman of Liadi, the first Rebbe of Chabad-Lubavitch.

Rambam this is split into three levels of effort:

1. The 3-Chapter Level: A one-year cycle of 3 daily chapters from the books of Maimonides, this is the hardest level.
2. The 1-Chapter Level: A three-year cycle of 1 daily chapter from the books of Maimonides, this is the middle level.
3. The Sefer Hamitzvot (Daily commandment) Level: A short daily rundown of the 613 commandments based on the schedule of the 3-Chapter Level; this is the easiest level.

Hayom Yom this is a daily guidebook of Chabad teachings and customs, originally compiled by the sixth Lubavitcher Rebbe Yosef Yitzchak Shneurson

Inyanei Geulah u'Moshiach this is a collection of teachings focusing on the coming of Messiah in Judaism and the Redemption period, emphasizing the importance of faith and the actions necessary to bring about this era according to Rabbinic literature and Hasidic philosophy Daily Wisdom this is a collection of daily insight based on Torah teachings and Chassidic philosophy by Chabad House Publications

== Distribution ==
Chayenu has three weekly distributions. The Chayenu magazine, the Chayenu-3 magazine (includes the 3 chapter level of Rambam instead of the 1 chapter level and Sefer Hamitzvot level), and the Chayenu app which is all of Chayenu's daily study contents digitally.

The Chayenu publiocation is a subscription based booklet priced 21 United States Dollars for Chayenu and 25 United States Dollars for Chayenu3 with infrequent discounts offered for students studying in Yeshiva. while the Chayenu app does not require a weekly subscription.

Chayenu and Chayenu3 magazine are shipped weekly by The Crown Heights Shipping & Copy Center
