= Igrot Kodesh =

Book with letters by Menachem Mendel Schneerson

- Author: Menachem Mendel Schneerson
- Language: Hebrew, Yiddish
- Series: Kovets Shalshelet ha-or
- Genre: Correspondence
- Publisher: Kehot Publication Society
- Publication date: 1987
- Media type: Book
- ISBN: 0826658008
- OCLC: 271166091
- Preceded by: Likkutei Sichos
- Followed by: Torat Menachem - farbrengens

Igrot Kodesh (literally "Holy Epistles" but more commonly known as "Letters of the Rebbe") is a collection of correspondence and responses of the seventh Rebbe of Chabad-Lubavitch, Menachem Mendel Schneerson.

It is modeled after Igrot Kodesh Maharayatz which are the letters of the sixth Rebbe of Lubavitch, Yosef Yitzchok Schneersohn. The topics considered in these letters include many realms of discussion, and numerous disciplines of human pursuit. Its purview encompassing philosophy (be it Talmudic, Halachic, Hasidic, mystical or other), scientific matters, global events, counsel in private issues, schooling, and social/communal proceedings. In the year 1987 the Rebbe gave instructions to publish these letters

Igrot Kodesh is up to 42 volumes as of 2026.

== Bibliomancy ==
There is within some members of Chabad-Lubavitch to use the Igrot Kodesh to ask advice from the Rebbe in a similar way which other Jews use the Hebrew Bible to ask advice from Hashem.
