= Vaad Talmidei Hatmimim Haolami =

Student organization

Vaad Hatmimim Haolami
- Formation: 2001
- Founded: 2001
- Founder: Rabbi Tzvi Altein
- Headquarters: Brooklyn, New York
- Location: New York
- Members: 53 Yeshivot, 7,000 students
- Key people: Rabbi Tzvi Altein
- Parent organization: Agudas Chasidei Chabad
- Website: www.vaadhatmimim.org

Vaad Hatmimim Haolami (or simply The Vaad), is a student organization of the worldwide Chabad Lubavitch Yeshiva network. The Vaad was established in 2001 under the auspices of the Central Lubavitch Yeshiva faculty. Its central office is located at Lubavitch World Headquarters and is directed by Rabbi Tzvi Altein. The regional office in Israel oversees activities for the Israeli Yeshiva network. The Vaad is affiliated with Agudas Chasidei Chabad, the umbrella organisation of the Chabad Lubavitch movement.

== Activities ==
- Kinus Hatmimim Haolami is the largest annual gathering of Chabad students. It takes place Yud Shvat, the Yartzeit of the Previous Rebbe, Rabbi Yosef Yitzchak Schneersohn and day the Lubavitcher Rebbe assumed leadership of Chabad. The gathering is held in Brooklyn, New York and is attended by thousands of students. This event culminates several days of inspirational programs, including seminars, Farbrengens and visiting the Rebbe's Ohel. The event is addressed by leading Rabbis from Yeshivos around the world.
- Extensive programs and accommodations for the thousands of guests who visit Brooklyn during the month of Tishrei. Besides providing flights for the guest students and overseeing their study schedule during their visit, the Vaad coordinates a full schedule of classes, lectures, seminars, panels, tours and Farbrengens.
- Study campaigns in connection with Yud Aleph Nissan, the birthday of the Rebbe. These campaigns include selected teachings from the Rebbeim that are studied by students during their free time. The students take tests on the material, and are rewarded according to their results.
- Study campaigns in connection to Gimmel Tammuz with a similar format.
- Study campaigns in connection with Hey Teves.
- Network for Talmidim Hashluchim, the student mentors who serve in Yeshivos worldwide. The network provides a support base and resources for the various programs they do. The Vaad coordinates an annual Yom Iyun, day of training, for these students.

== Publications ==
- A Chasidisher Derher - a monthly magazine in the English language that covers a large variety of topics. The Derher is read beyond Yeshiva students and is available in communities around the world.
- Kovetz Lechizuk Hahiskashrus - a series of periodic booklets in the Hebrew language (usually published in conjunction with holidays) which include talks, letters and pictures of the Rebbe as well as diaries and other items of interest from Chasidim.
- Periodic publications marking special days in Chabad history are published and include selected teachings culled from Chabad literature. These study guides are compiled by leading Rabbis and experts in Chabad teachings.
- Study guides and material to aide students in the daily study of Rambam's Mishneh Torah
