= Amy-Jill Levine =

American biblical and Jewish studies scholar (born 1956)

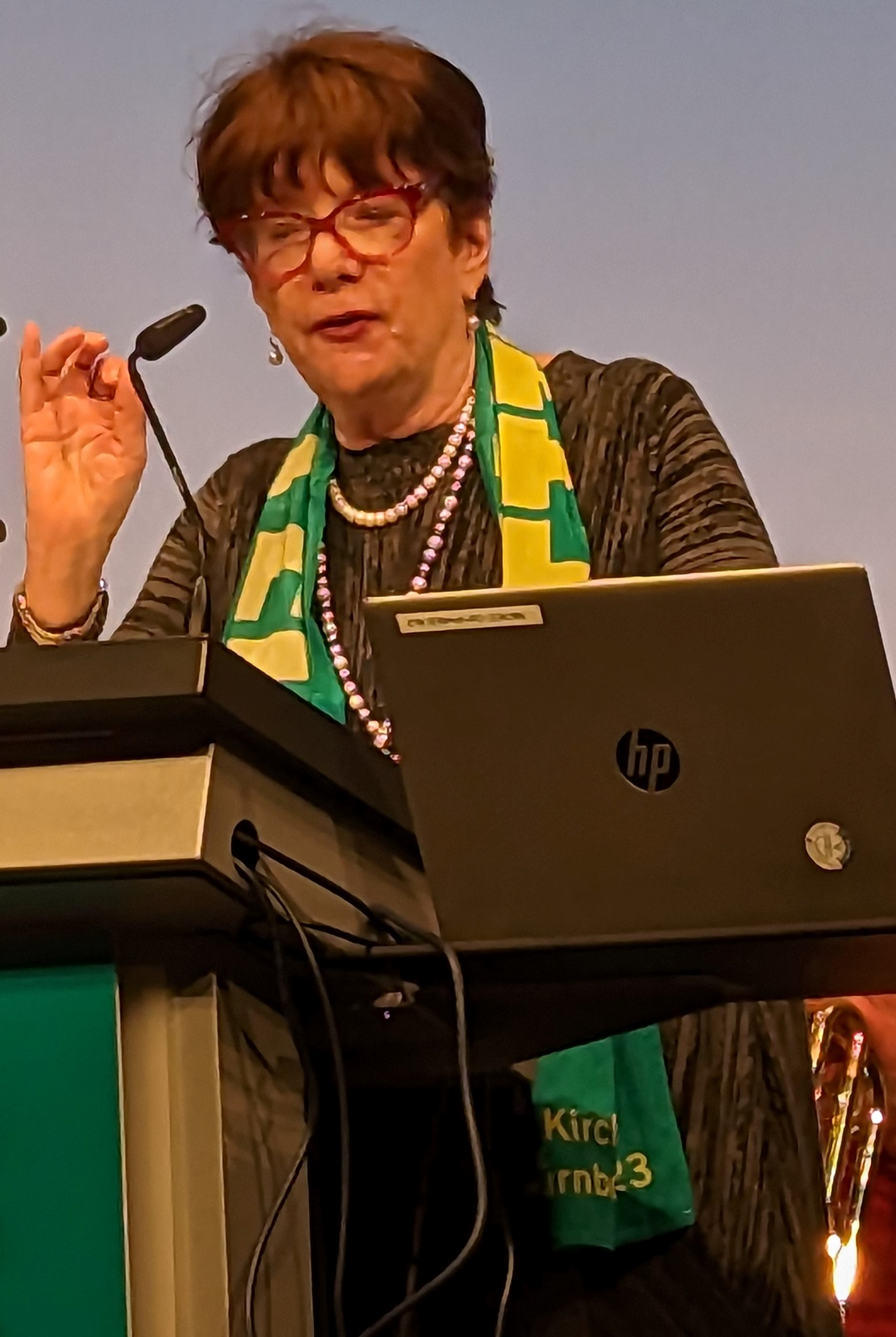
- Levine in 2023
- Born: 1956 (age 69–70)
- Other name: A. J. Levine
- Spouse: Jay Geller
- Awards: American Academy of Arts and Sciences, member 2021; Seelisberg Prize 2022; Council of Christians and Jews Bridge Award 2022; Hubert Walter Award for Reconciliation and Interfaith Cooperation 2023; Academia Europaea, member 2024

Academic background
- Education: Smith College; Duke University
- Thesis: The Matthean Program of Salvation History (1984)
- Doctoral advisor: D. Moody Smith

Academic work
- Discipline: Biblical studies
- School or tradition: Feminism
- Institutions: Swarthmore College; Vanderbilt University; Hartford International University
- Notable works: The Misunderstood Jew (2006); Short Stories by Jesus (2014); The Jewish Annotated New Testament (2011, 2nd ed. 2017); The Bible With and Without Jesus (2020); The Pharisees (2021); The Gospel of Luke (2018)

Amy-Jill Levine (born 1956) is Rabbi Stanley M. Kessler Distinguished Professor of New Testament and Jewish Studies at Hartford International University for Religion and Peace and University Professor of New Testament and Jewish Studies Emerita at Vanderbilt University. Her research treats Second Temple Judaism, Jewish-Christian relations, the historical Jesus, and the parables, with sustained attention to eliminating antisemitic, sexist, and homophobic readings of biblical texts.

== Early life and education ==
Levine was raised in North Dartmouth, Massachusetts, in a largely Portuguese Roman Catholic neighborhood, and she has described early exposure to Christian traditions in that context. She earned a B.A. at Smith College with high honors in religion and English, and an M.A. and Ph.D. in Religion at Duke University. Her dissertation, "The Matthean Program of Salvation History: A Contextual Analysis of the Exclusivity Logia," was completed in 1984 under D. Moody Smith.

== Career ==
Levine taught at Swarthmore College before joining Vanderbilt University in 1994, where she held appointments in the Divinity School and the Department of Jewish Studies. She later became Mary Jane Werthan Professor of Jewish Studies and University Professor of New Testament and Jewish Studies. She retired from Vanderbilt in 2021 with emerita status, then joined Hartford International University as Rabbi Stanley M. Kessler Distinguished Professor of New Testament and Jewish Studies. In spring 2019 she taught New Testament at the Pontifical Biblical Institute in Rome, the first Jew to do so, and she has had multiple audiences with Pope Francis.

Levine has produced widely used courses for The Teaching Company, including "Great Figures of the New Testament" and "Great Figures of the Old Testament," as well as a survey of the Old Testament.

Levine serves as New Testament editor of the Oxford Biblical Commentary Series and as editor or volume editor for several volumes in the Wisdom Commentary series.

== Scholarship ==
Levine has published on the historical Jesus, Matthean studies, Pauline interpretation within Judaism, and the reception of Jews and Judaism in Christian exegesis and homiletics. With Marc Zvi Brettler she co-edited The Jewish Annotated New Testament first published by Oxford University Press in 2011 with a revised and expanded second edition in 2017. With Ben Witherington III she co-authored the commentary The Gospel of Luke in the New Cambridge Bible Commentary series, a project that juxtaposes Jewish and Christian scholarly perspectives. She co-edited The Pharisees: An Interdisciplinary Study with Joseph Sievers, published by Eerdmans in 2021, which includes an essay by Pope Francis and addresses the figure of the Pharisee in history, exegesis, and reception.

Her single-author monographs for general audiences include The Misunderstood Jew: The Church and the Scandal of the Jewish Jesus and Short Stories by Jesus: The Enigmatic Parables of a Controversial Rabbi. With Brettler she co-authored The Bible With and Without Jesus: How Jews and Christians Read the Same Stories Differently. Her Abingdon Press series offers introductions to biblical themes for congregational study, including The Difficult Words of Jesus, Witness at the Cross, Signs and Wonders, and The Gospel of Mark: A Beginner's Guide to the Good News.

== Public engagement ==
Levine lectures internationally on the Bible, Christian–Jewish relations, and questions of religion, gender, and sexuality. She has held leadership roles in the Society of Biblical Literature, the Catholic Biblical Association, and the Association for Jewish Studies. In July 2026, she was elected president of the Catholic Biblical Association of America. She is a member of Congregation Sherith Israel in Nashville, an Orthodox synagogue, and has described herself as an "unorthodox" Orthodox member.

== Honors and recognition ==
Levine was elected to the American Academy of Arts and Sciences in 2021. She received the inaugural Seelisberg Prize in 2022 for contributions to Jewish–Christian relations and the Council of Christians and Jews Bridge Award in 2022. She received the Hubert Walter Award for Reconciliation and Interfaith Cooperation in 2023 from the Archbishop of Canterbury. She was elected to Academia Europaea in 2024. The American Academy of Arts and Sciences lists her among members in the Section for Philosophy and Religious Studies elected in 2021.

She has received honorary doctorates from Franklin College, Christian Theological Seminary, Drury University, the University of Richmond, the Episcopal Theological Seminary of the Southwest, and the University of South Carolina-Upstate.

During the same 2026 meeting at which she was elected president, the Catholic Biblical Association presented her with a festschrift entitled, Disruptive Readings: Essays Honoring the Work and Wisdom of Amy-Jill Levine.

== Selected publications ==
=== Books and monographs ===
- The Misunderstood Jew: The Church and the Scandal of the Jewish Jesus New York, HarperSanFrancisco, 2006.
- Short Stories by Jesus: The Enigmatic Parables of a Controversial Rabbi New York, HarperOne, 2014, paperback 2015.
- with Douglas A. Knight, The Meaning of the Bible: What the Jewish Scriptures and the Christian Old Testament Can Teach Us New York, HarperOne, 2011.
- with Warren Carter, The New Testament: Methods and Meanings Nashville, Abingdon, 2013.
- with Marc Zvi Brettler, The Bible With and Without Jesus: How Jews and Christians Read the Same Stories Differently New York, HarperOne, 2020.

=== Edited volumes ===
- with Marc Zvi Brettler, eds., The Jewish Annotated New Testament Oxford, Oxford University Press, 2011, 2nd ed. 2017.
- with Joseph Sievers, eds., The Pharisees: An Interdisciplinary Study Grand Rapids, Eerdmans, 2021.
- editor, Feminist Companions to the New Testament and Early Christian Writings 13 volumes, Continuum and T&T Clark, various dates.

=== Commentary ===
- with Ben Witherington III, The Gospel of Luke New Cambridge Bible Commentary, Cambridge University Press, 2018.

=== Abingdon "Beginner's Guide" and related studies ===
- The Difficult Words of Jesus Nashville, Abingdon Press, 2021.
- Witness at the Cross: A Beginner's Guide to Holy Friday Nashville, Abingdon Press, 2021.
- Signs and Wonders: A Beginner's Guide to the Miracles of Jesus Nashville, Abingdon Press, 2022.
- The Gospel of Mark: A Beginner's Guide to the Good News Nashville, Abingdon Press, 2023.

=== Children's books with Sandy Eisenberg Sasso ===
- Who Counts? 100 Sheep, 10 Coins, and 2 Sons Louisville, Flyaway Books, 2017.
- The Marvelous Mustard Seed Louisville, Flyaway Books, 2018.
- Who Is My Neighbor? Louisville, Flyaway Books, 2019.
- A Very Big Problem Louisville, Flyaway Books, 2020.

=== Teaching Company courses ===
- Great Figures of the Old Testament The Teaching Company, 2002, audio and guidebook.
- Great Figures of the New Testament The Teaching Company, 2003, audio and guidebook.
- The Old Testament The Teaching Company, audio course.

== Personal life ==
Levine is married to Jay Geller, a scholar of modern Jewish culture. They have two children. She is a member of Congregation Sherith Israel in Nashville.

== See also ==
- Jewish–Christian relations
