= Divine soul =

Type of soul in the Kabbalah

In kabbalah, the divine soul (נפש האלקית; nefesh ha'elokit) is the source of good inclination, or yetzer tov, and Godly desires.

The divine soul is composed of the ten sefirot from the side of holiness, and garbs itself with three garments of holiness, namely Godly thought, speech and action associated with the 613 commandments of the Torah. Because its desire is to cleave to Godliness, it is usually in conflict with the nefesh habehamit, whose desire is initially for physical pleasures. It is believed this soul is unique to Jews and not possessed by gentiles.

== Reluctance of the soul to be born ==
In Pirkei Avot 4:22 it is stated:

Do not let your evil inclination reassure you that your grave will be a place of comfort for you. For against your will were you formed, against your will you were born, against your will you live, against your will you die, and against your will shall you give judgement and accounting before the King Who Reigns Over Kings, the Holy One, Blessed is He.

Regarding this, Bartenura explains that the soul does not desire to leave the pure place where souls reside before coming down to earth. An angel forces it to leave its heavenly abode and enter the mother's womb, after which an angel again forces it to come out and be born.

On the same passage, Rabbi Menachem Mendel Schneerson, the Lubavitcher Rebbe, notes that "against your will you live" seems to conflict with "against your will you die." "Against your will you live" makes sense according to Bartenura, because the soul was on a much higher level before it came to this world; at that time it was blissfully cleaving to Godliness. How, then, can it be said that "against your will you die," when the soul returns to God? He resolves it by explaining that the soul was convinced to descend when it was informed of the Divine Intention to "make a dwelling for God in the lower realms." This can only be accomplished by studying Torah and performing mitzvot on earth. Despite being reluctant to leave the Heavens, its most powerful, core and essential desire is actually to cleave to God; and because of that, it also yearns to cleave to and be in accord with the Divine Will. The soul therefore descends, in order to create the "dwelling place in the nether realms" and fulfill the Divine Will. Likewise, it is reluctant to die and leave the world, because the mitzvot can only be fulfilled while enclothed in a physical body.

== In the Tanya ==
In the Tanya, Rabbi Shneur Zalman of Liadi stated that the nefesh ha'elokit is "literally a part of God above." This is supported by quoting the morning prayer "Elokai neshamah", which says "the soul You gave me is pure. ...You blew it into me," then quoting a phrase of the Zohar that "one who blows, blows from within him." This is taken to mean, "from His innermost."

=== Unique to Jews ===
The Tanya also notes that this soul is unique to Jews alone. He cites various verses (Exodus 4:22: "My firstborn son, Israel", Deuteronomy 14:1: "You are children to the LORD your God") showing that Jews are considered God's children, and then links it to a mystical statement that "a child is derived from the brain of his father." It then cites Maimonides (Hilchot Yesodei HaTorah 2:10) who says, "He is the Knowledge, and He is the Knower," thus proving that the Jewish Divine soul is derived from the Divine Thought, which is the same as God Himself.

=== Relation to human anatomy ===
The Tanya states that the nefesh ha'elokit resides primarily in the brain, from which it spreads throughout the body. It is also manifest, albeit to a lesser extent, in the right ventricle of the heart, from which it may take control of the left ventricle of the heart where the nefesh habehamit is primarily manifest.

== Allegorical terms ==
Because the nefesh ha'elokit is derived from God Himself, it is commonly referred to as a "prince" or a "princess" in many allegories. The Parable of the Harlot and the Prince from the Zohar (part II, 163a) is one example. Another example is the Parable of the Princess and the Peasant.

== See also ==
- Animal soul
- Soul
- Spirit
- Yetzer hara
