= Hayom Yom =

Book by Menachem Mendel Schneerson

- Author: Rabbi Menachem Mendel Schneerson, the seventh Chabad Rebbe
- Language: Yiddish, Hebrew
- Published: 1943, Brooklyn (Kehot Publication Society)

Hayom Yom (Hebrew: היום יום, "Today is day ...") is an anthology of Hasidic aphorisms and customs arranged according to the calendar for the Hebrew year of 5703 (1942–43). The work was compiled and arranged by Rabbi Menachem Mendel Schneerson, the seventh Rebbe of Chabad, from the talks and letters of the sixth Chabad Rebbe, Rabbi Yosef Yitzchok Schneersohn. The work was published in 1943.

For each day, the calendar prescribed sections of Chumash, Tehillim, and Tanya for study that day; this practice is known in Chabad as Chitas (חת"ת). Each day's portion of Chumash is studied with the corresponding Rashi commentary.

Hayom Yom contains a biographical overview of the seven Chabad Rebbes. In Hayom Yom many of Chabad customs were first published. The sixth Chabad Rebbe, Rabbi Yosef Yitzchak Schneersohn, described Hayom Yom as a “truly chasidic cultural work.”

== Format ==
The calendar was designed for the Chabad Hasidic year extending from 19 Kislev of the year (5703) to 18 Kislev of the following year (5704).

Any teaching or narrative recorded in the first person relates to the sixth Rebbe, Rabbi Yosef Yitzchok Schneersohn. Each mention of “my revered father” or “my revered grandfather” refers to the fifth and fourth Rebbes of Chabad, Rabbi Shalom Dovber Schneersohn and Rabbi Shmuel Schneersohn (Rabbi Yosef Yitzchak's father and grandfather), respectively.

Each day's entry also noted historical events that happened on that day, or Lubavitcher customs associated with that day and/or a short inspirational thought for the day generally taken from the works of Yosef Yitzchok Schneersohn. In describing this work, Rabbi Yosef Yitzchak wrote: "A book that is small in format... but bursting with pearls and diamonds of choicest quality... A splendid palace of Chasidism." The calendar was never reissued for subsequent years but has been reprinted many times and is still studied.

== Name ==
The calendar's name is taken from the words used to open the recital of the daily psalm in the Jewish morning prayer service, which begins "Today is the nth day of the week..."

== Editions ==
A number of English translations of Hayom Yom have been published.

An adaptation of Hayom Yom for children with illustrations entitled A Diamond a Day was published in 2015.

A two volume commentary on Hayom Yom was authored by Chabad Rabbi Michoel Seligson.

== Usage ==
In some Lubavitcher congregations, the entry for each day is read aloud after the morning service. This practice serves to provide words of guidance and inspiration as one prepares to leave the synagogue. This post-prayer reading seems to be a more common practice in Chabad communities in North and South America than in Israel.

== Teachings ==
Hayom Yom expounds the Chabad Hasidic theological principle of "continuous creation" as an injunction of practicality:

"God created the universe and all physical objects ex nihilo, "something from nothing." Jews must transform "something into nothing." They must transform materiality into spirituality… This is an obligation upon every specific individual."
