= Chitas =

Chabad term

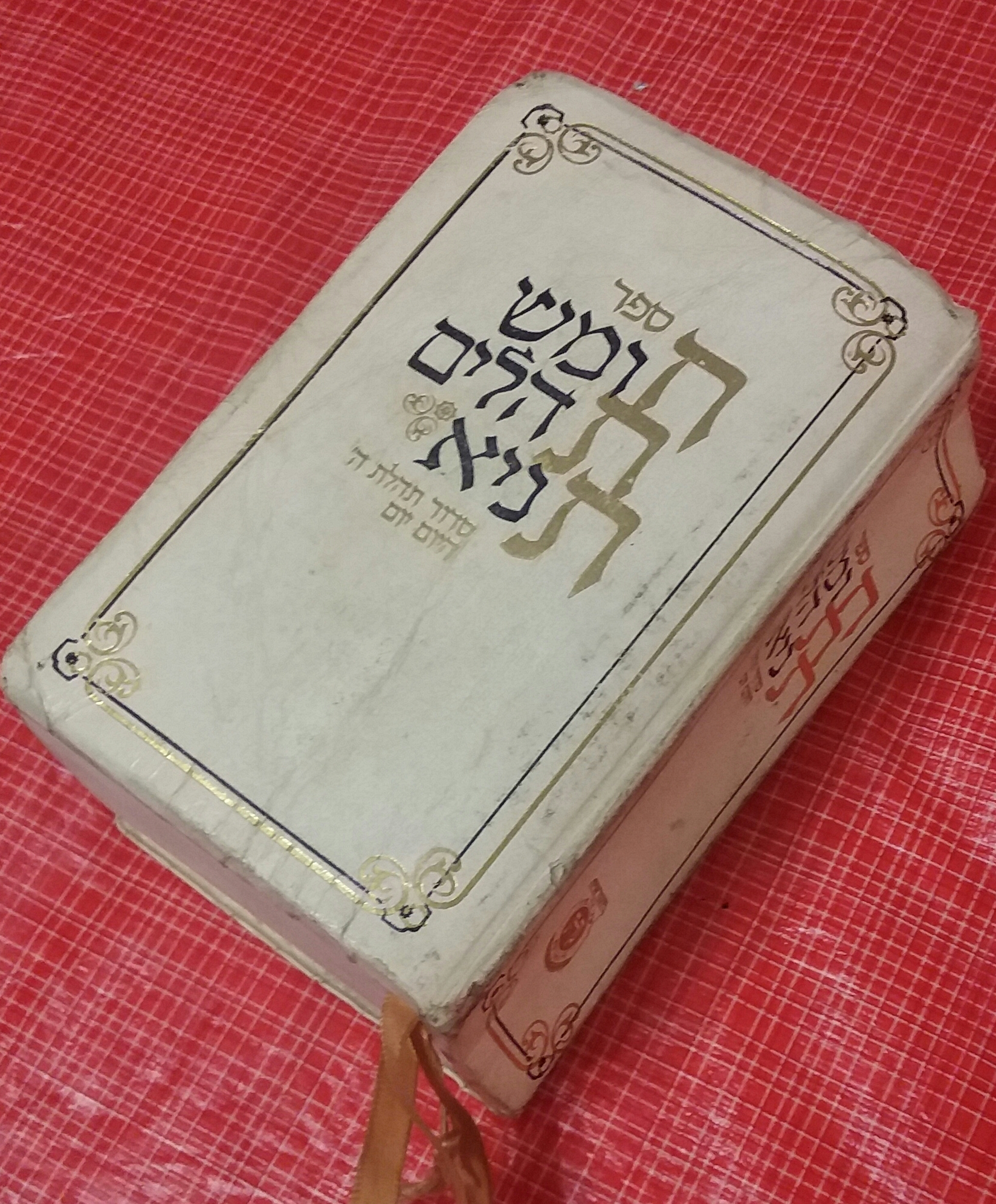
Chitas Book

Chitas or Chitat (Hebrew: חת״ת, Hebrew pronunciation: [χiˈtat], Ashkenazi pronunciation [ˈχitas]) is a Hebrew acronym for Chumash (the five books of Moses), Tehillim (Psalms), and Tanya (a seminal work of Hasidic philosophy by Rabbi Schneur Zalman of Liadi). These are considered basic Jewish texts according to the Chabad Jewish community, a Hasidic group. It is their custom to study these works according to a yearly cycle, which is known colloquially as "doing ChiTaS."

== Examples ==
- Chitas (Kehot Publication Society, 2003) ISBN 9780826602350
- Daily Studies in Chitas - The Schottenstein Edition (Chayenu and Kehot Publication Society, 2024) ISBN 9780826608802
- Tefillah: Sections from Chitas for Kids (2024) ISBN 9798301107498

== See also ==
- Torah study § Study cycles
- Chayenu
- Devar Malchot
- Tehillat Hashem
