= Likkutei Sichos =

Chabad book

- Author: Menachem Mendel Schneerson
- Language: Hebrew, Yiddish
- Series: 40
- Publisher: VAAD L`HAFOTZAS SICHOS
- Media type: Book
- ISBN: 0826657184
- OCLC: 233054018

Likkutei Sichos, literally, "Collected Talks" (Hebrew: ליקוטי שיחות) contains both the scope and the core of the teachings of the Lubavitcher Rebbe, Rabbi Menachem Mendel Schneerson, and is the most authoritative source-text for Schneerson's (often novel) way of explaining Judaism and the world writ large.

Likkutei Sichos covers a range of topics including ideas in Jewish philosophy and theology, biblical and Talmudic commentary on biblical, kabbalistic expositions, moral and practical directives, and perspectives on world events. The essays were transcribed from the public talks given by Rabbi Schneerson and are compiled in over three dozen volumes - soon to print the complete set of over one hundred volumes, arranged by the weekly Torah portion and special occasions in the Jewish and Hasidic calendar.

Rabbi Schneerson's primary vehicle for conveying his teachings were the farbrengens held on Shabbat, the festivals, and special occasions in the Chabad Lubavitch calendar, at which he would speak for many hours.

Of the many of thousands of talks that Schneerson delivered, those that were the most basic to his weltanschauung and message were compiled in the Likkutei Sichot, which originally appeared in weekly pamphlets. He reviewed and extensively edited each of these transcriptions before it went to press, making the Likkutei Sichot the authoritative medium with which to disseminate his teachings.

The volumes of Likkutei Sichos are published by the Lubavitch Publication House Kehot Publication Society. The edited Sichos represent much of Schneerson's central teachings, and unique spiritual voice for the generation, with other major works being the deeper, mystical Maamarim (Hasidic discourses), unedited talks, personal correspondence etc. The nature of his leadership and thought marks a culminating fulfillment of Hasidic history, representing the fullest measure of the Hasidic ideal to disseminate the "wellsprings" of Chassidus in the widest and most accessible forms, and united with the other dimensions of Judaism. The many aspects of Likkutei Sichos present the most accessible form of the Rebbe's thought, and its practical application.

== Contents ==
Some of the volumes of Likkutei Sichos are devoted to explaining mystical Hasidic philosophy, as it explains the weekly portion of Torah, Jewish festivals, or other ideas drawn from all aspects of traditional Jewish thought. Other talks are devoted to elucidating the "Revealed" dimensions of Judaism, such as Talmudic commentary. In this category are the celebrated "Rashi Sichos" and the Hadranim talks given on the completion of learning cycles.

== "Rashi Sichos" ==
In 1964 the Lubavitcher Rebbe began his delivery of some 800+ public talks over a period of over 25 years on the subject of Rashi’s commentary to the Torah. The medieval French Rabbi Rashi is among the most important traditional Jewish commentators on the books of the Tanakh, and the many volumes of Talmud. His commentary on the 5 Books of the Torah elucidates the simple meaning (p'shat), with some additional meanings from the Midrashic method, which initially appear to be utilized when the simple meaning still leaves questions.

The essential nature of Rashi's explanations on the Torah has historically drawn many sub-commentaries from leading Rabbis, who explain why Rashi says what he does. It can be said that the Lubavitcher Rebbe's Rashi Sichos perhaps represent his personally most innovative contribution to Jewish thought, out of a complete mastery and innovative teaching in all areas of Judaism. In the Rashi Sichos, Schneerson brings a new approach that initially cites all previous sub-commentaries from earlier authorities, and then proceeds to explain why each of them falls short. Often these earlier explanations rely on Talmudic thought. He elucidates a deceptively simple explanation of Rashi that he often culminates by additionally relating his conclusions to their spiritual, mystical parallels and practical outcomes.

In each talk, the Rebbe would offer a novel interpretation of one of Rashi’s comments, based on principles which Rashi had apparently followed when writing his entire commentary. Each lecture of the Rebbe built on the previous one, gradually assembling a picture of Rashi’s commentary as an extremely organized, unified system of Torah exegesis.

Many who were present at these lectures at their inception in the late sixties and early seventies, recall how the “Rashi talk” was literally the highlight of the entire Sabbath afternoon gathering.

While all of the talks were published immediately in transcript form (almost word for word), many hundreds of them underwent a thorough review by the Rebbe who re-analyzed the arguments according to strict academic criteria and reconstructed the talk as a scholarly paper, supported by numerous footnotes. According to the testimony of one of his personal assistants, the Rebbe would often dedicate as much as 18 hours a week to this task.

== Style ==
It can be said that in all of Schneerson's many-dimensional scholarship, he captures the simple essence of Hasidic mysticism, and unites it with the Revealed aspects of Judaism, always seeking to bring ideas into greatest tangibility, and above all practical outcomes ("The main thing is the deed"). This reflects the essential meaning of Hasidism, which uncovers the inner spiritual meaning of Kabbalah, and seeks to bring this Divine essence down to the lowest levels. The talks represent this, as in contrast to the Maamarim (Hasidic discourses), the historically more traditional vehicle for Hasidic mysticism, in the informal Sichos (Talks), the Rebbe tends to avoid deep Kabbalistic terminology. The talks bring Hasidic thought into everyday language. This represents a culminating stage to the historical development of Hasidic thought.

== Publication ==
Likkutei Sichos was published by the Vaad Lhafotzas Sichos through the main Chabad publishing house. The work is organized according to the weekly Torah reading (Parshah) and the Jewish calendar.

Likkutei Sichos is an anthology of Rabbi Schneerson's public talks; the speeches were transcribed by redactors (meinichim) prior to publication. These redactors also served as "choizrim" in the event the talk could not be recorded electronically or (such as on Shabbat and festivals when writing and recording is forbidden under Jewish law). The redactors' transcripts were then submitted to Rabbi Schneerson for editing prior to publishing.

Farbrengens were sometimes delivered on weekdays in order to mark occasions like Chasidic festivals. These were at first available directly around the world by phone-link, and in later years, broadcast across America on live television channels. They were then put in writing, like the talks delivered on Shabbos. After being edited personally by Schneerson, they were distributed in booklet form worldwide. They were later compiled into books, of which there is a set of 39 volumes. Vols. 1-9 are in Yiddish; vols. 10-14, in Hebrew; vols. 15-29 are in Yiddish; and vols. 30-39, in Hebrew.

In particular, Reb Yoel Kahn is noteworthy for having prepared Likkutei Sichos vol 5-9.

Other talks were released as unedited talks, and included in the series Toras Menachem - Hisva'aduyos (Lahak Hanochos, 1982 and on) and the series Sichos Kodesh (various publishers).

=== English editions ===
Likkutei Sichos was first translated into the English language in 1979. The work received editorial input from Rabbi Menachem Mendel. The translated work is currently published by the Sichos in English publishing house and is translated by Eliyahu Touger.

A single volume of collected talks in English was written by Rabbi Dr. Jonathan Sacks, former Chief Rabbi of England. The volume is titled Torah Studies.

An English Translation of selected "Rashi Sichos" was published by Kehot Publication Society, titled "Studies In Rashi".
