= Tanya (Judaism) =

Main work of the Chabad philosophy

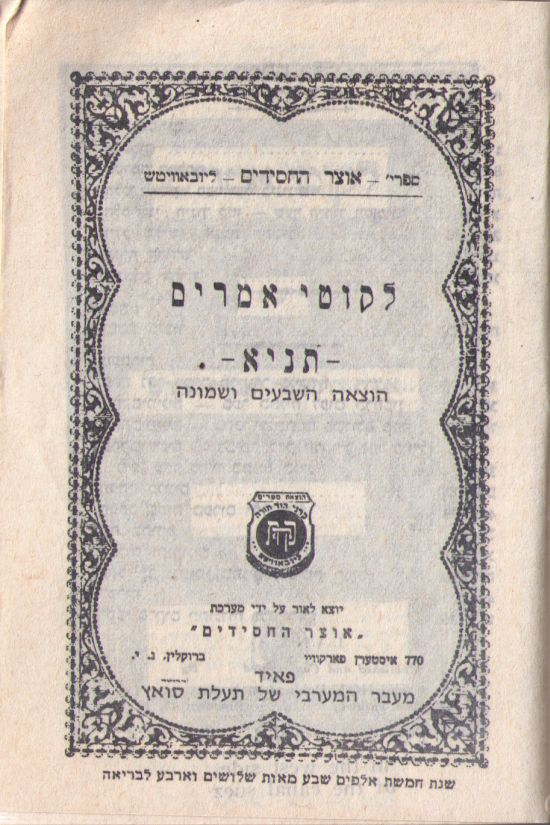
Edition of the Tanya printed in Fayid from 1974. The 7th leader of Chabad encouraged new printings to be made in remote places.

The Tanya (Hebrew: תניא) is an early work of Hasidic philosophy by Shneur Zalman of Liadi, the first Rebbe of Chabad, first published in 1796. Although the first edition was titled Likkutei Amarim (Hebrew: ליקוטי אמרים, "collected sayings"), this was downgraded to a subtitle by the second edition of 1798 and replaced by its incipit "tanya" (Aramaic: תניא, "It was taught: they adjure him to be righteous and not evil . . ."). The Tanya is composed of five sections that define Hasidic mystical psychology and theology as a handbook for daily spiritual life in Jewish observance.

The Tanya is the main work of Chabad philosophy and the Chabad approach to Hasidic mysticism, as it defines its general interpretation and method. The subsequent extensive library of the Chabad school, authored by successive leaders, builds upon the approach of the Tanya. Chabad differed from mainstream Hasidism by its philosophical investigation and intellectual analysis of Hasidic Torah exegesis. This emphasised the mind as the route to internalising Hasidic mystical dveikus (emotional fervour), in contrast to general Hasidism's creative enthusiasm in faith. Consequently, Chabad Hasidic writings are typically characterised by their systematic intellectual structure, while other classic texts of general Hasidic mysticism are usually more compiled or anecdotal.

As one of the founding figures of Hasidic mysticism, Schneur Zalman and his approach in the Tanya are revered by some other Hasidic schools, although they tend to avoid its meditative methods. In Chabad, it is called "the Written Torah of Hasidus", with the subsequent Chabad corpus being the analogical Oral Torah. In it, Zalman brings the new interpretations of Jewish mysticism by the Baal Shem Tov, founder of Hasidism, into philosophical articulation and definition. This intellectual form synthesises Hasidic concepts of divine omnipresence and Jewish soulfulness with other historical components of Rabbinic literature, embodied in the Talmud, Jewish philosophy, Musar (ethical) literature and Lurianic Kabbalah. The Tanya has therefore been seen in Chabad as the defining Hasidic text and a subsequent stage of Jewish mystical evolution.

== Background to the Chabad approach ==
The Tanya deals with Jewish spirituality, psychology and theology from the point of view of Hasidic philosophy and its inner explanations of Kabbalah (Jewish mysticism). It offers advice for each individual on how to serve God in his daily life.

=== Early Hasidic movement ===
The first few generations of the Hasidic movement established the various approaches of its different schools. The third generation great students of Dov Ber of Mezeritch, who spread out across Eastern Europe, became the leaders of Hasidism in Ukraine, Poland, Hungary and Russia. Among them, Schneur Zalman articulated a different approach to Hasidic philosophy from general Hasidism. The founding Hasidic mysticism of the Baal Shem Tov, and subsequent Hasidic Masters, emphasised the emotions of dveikus to cleave to the Omnipresent Divine. The intellectual ("Chabad") approach of Schneur Zalman, continued by successive Lubavitch Rebbes, emphasised the mind as the route to the inner heart. The Chabad school requires knowledge of Godliness, drawn from Hasidic philosophy, to establish Hasidic mystical faith. This enabled Schneur Zalman to take Hasidus to Lithuanian Jews from nearby White Russia, and aroused the opposition of their early leaders. In this, Chabad is a separate offshoot of general Hasidism, and to its students is the profound fulfillment of systematically articulating its inner depths. Therefore, in Chabad, the Baal Shem Tov and Schneur Zalman, who share the same birthday, are called the "two great luminaries" (after Genesis 1:16, according to the Midrashic account, before the moon was diminished), representing heart and mind.

=== Kabbalah and Hasidism ===
The historical development of Kabbalah from the 12th century, and its new formulations in the 16th century, explained the subtle aspects and categories of the traditional system of Jewish metaphysics. Hasidic spirituality left aside the abstract focus of Kabbalah on the Spiritual Realms, to look at its inner meaning and soul as it relates to man in this World. The founder of Hasidism, the Baal Shem Tov, brought the Kabbalistic idea of Omnipresent Divine immanence in Creation into daily Jewish worship of the common folk. This enabled the popularisation of Kabbalah by relating it to the natural psychological perception and emotional dveikus (fervour) of man. The mystical dimension of Judaism became accessible and tangible to the whole community. Outwardly this was expressed in new veneration of sincerity, emphasis on prayer and deeds of loving-kindness. The unlettered Jewish folk were cherished and encouraged in their sincere simplicity, while the elite scholars sought to emulate their negation of ego through study of Hasidic exegetical thought. Hagiographic storytelling about Hasidic Masters captured the mystical charisma of the tzaddik. The inner dimension of this mystical revival of Judaism was expressed by the profound new depth of interpretation of Jewish mysticism in Hasidic philosophy. Great scholars also followed the Baal Shem Tov as they saw the profound meanings of his new teachings. The Baal Shem Tov's successor Dov Ber of Mezeritch became the architect of the Hasidic movement, and explained to his close circle of disciples the underlying meanings of the Baal Shem Tov's explanations, parables and stories.

=== Chabad ===
Mind versus heart. Among Dov Ber's disciples, Rabbi Schneur Zalman of Liadi formed Hasidic philosophy into a profound intellectual system, called "Chabad" after the Kabbalistic terms for the intellect, that differs from mainstream Hasidic emotional approaches to mystical faith. This seeks inward Jewish observance, while seeing charismatic Hasidic enthusiasm as external and downplaying it. The mysticism of Schneur Zalman did not seek cold intellectual investigation. In common with all of Hasidism, it awakens joy and negation of self-awareness, from the Jew's perception of the Divine in all things. But Chabad, later to be called after its Russian village of Lubavitch, sees external emotional expression as superficial if devoid of inner contemplation. In this vein, it is related that the second Lubavitch Rebbe, Dov Ber Schneuri, would pray motionless for hours. Emotional expression was replaced with inner, hidden emotional ecstasy from his intellectual contemplation of Hasidic philosophy during prayer. At the end of praying, his hat and clothing would be soaked in perspiration. Typically, he wrote one of the most personal mystical accounts in Judaism, his "Tract on Ecstasy", that instructs the Chabad follower in the levels of contemplation. This explains his father's concept of the Chabad articulation of Hasidism. While the Baal Shem Tov stressed the heart, Schneur Zalman stressed the mind, but it was a warm, fiery mystical intellectualism.

Intellect versus faith. By giving Hasidus philosophical investigation, the Chabad school explained the inner meanings of the "Torah of the Baal Shem Tov". Its systematic investigation enables the mind to grasp and internalize the transcendent spirituality of mainstream Hasidism. If the mind can bring the soul of Hasidism into understanding and knowledge through logic, then its effects on the person can be more inward. The classic writings of other Hasidic schools also relate the inner mysticism of Hasidic philosophy to the perception of each person. The aim of the Hasidic movement is to offer the Jewish mystical tradition in a new, internal form that speaks to every person. This would awaken spiritual awareness and feeling of God, through understanding of its mystical thought. Mainstream Hasidism relates this mystical revival through charismatic leadership and understanding based faith. The path of Schneur Zalman differs from other Hasidism, as it seeks to approach the heart through the development of the mind. Chabad writings of each generation of its dynasty, develop this intellectual explanation of Hasidic mystical ideas, into successively greater and more accessible reach. In recent times the last two Rebbes expressed the spiritual warmth of Chabad in terms of daily reality, language and relevance, in the Yiddish translations and memoires of Yosef Yitzchak Schneersohn, and especially the Likkutei Sichos of Menachem Mendel Schneerson.

Chabad Hasidus and other dimensions of Jewish thought. Because the approach of Chabad explains Hasidus in intellectual form, it can incorporate into its explanation the other aspects of historical Jewish thought. Complimentary or initially contradictory explanations of Jewish thought from Rabbinic Judaism, Jewish philosophy and Kabbalah can become synthesised into one unity. It can connect the different disciplines of mysticism (Kabbalah) and Jewish philosophy (Hakira), by relating to a higher, essential unity in Divinity, that harmonises diverse ideas. This approaches classic questions of theology from a different route than Hakira. The Jewish philosophers of the Middle Ages, such as Maimonides, reconciled Judaism with Greek philosophy. Their explanations of the nature of the Divine, are related from man's independent understanding from first principles. Hasidic thought looks to the inner meaning of Kabbalah, a conceptual system of metaphysics from mystical encounters with revelation. The insights it brings to theological questions, brought out in its Chabad explanation, are related from a mystical, higher reality "from above". When Hasidic thought addresses traditional questions, such as Divine Providence, immanence and transcendence, it offers "Inner Torah" explanations of spirituality, that can also be harmonised with the explanations of the "Revealed Torah". It is the ability of Hasidic thought to bring the abstract, esoteric systems of Kabbalah into conscious perception and mystical faith, by relating them to man's inner psychological awareness. The ideal of the Chabad approach is to articulate this spiritual perception in terms of man's understanding and knowledge.

== Structure ==
According to legend, Rabbi Shneur Zalman published his Likkutei Amarim anonymously in 1797. Later editions incorporated additional writings by Shneur Zalman. The latest version of this work, dating from 1814, consists of five parts:

1. Sefer shel Beinonim ("The Book of the Average Men"). This book is a Hasidic guide to the psychological drama of daily Jewish spiritual life. It describes how contemplating the mystical greatness of the Creator and the union that a Jew has with Him through the Torah's commandments, can achieve the love and fear of God necessary for sincere worship. This approach is the fundamental theme of Chabad teaching: to achieve emotional refinement during prayer and Jewish observance. However, in the path offered, this emotion must stem from intellectual understanding of Hasidic mysticism. That is why this approach and the movement are called Chabad, after the three intellectual Sephirot (God's emanations in Kabbalah): Chochmah (Wisdom), Binah (Understanding), Da'at (Knowledge). A Hasidic psychology of a Jew's two souls is investigated, the Divine soul and the Natural soul. The Divine soul (that only Jews have) is a true "part of God", a historic emphasis in Jewish thought, though based on earlier sources; the Natural soul is the one that Jews, gentiles and animals have. The book's guidance is for the intermediate person who is tempted by natural instincts, while the service of the true tzaddik in mystical thought is transcendent and only involved with holiness.
2. Sha'ar ha-Yichud ve'ha'Emunah ("The Gateway of Unity and Belief"). This book outlines the theological background to the first section's Hasidic life. It is an investigation of the meaning of God's Unity in Hasidism. The Panentheism (all creation takes place "within God") taught by the Baal Shem Tov is systematically articulated in Kabbalistic philosophy. God is all, but all is not God. Two levels of God's Unity are both paradoxically true, based on the Kabbalistic doctrine of the Tzimtzum. In the "Lower Unity" all Creation is nullified to God. In the "Higher Unity", Creation is an acosmic illusion as only God truly exists. The apparent plurality in Creation is only an effect of the concealments of Divinity. The origin of everything is nullification within the Divine Unity.
3. Iggeret HaTeshuvah ("Letter of Repentance"). This gives the Hasidic interpretation and Chabad method of Teshuvah (Return to God). This section is also known as the "Tanya Katan" ("Brief Tanya") as it is the gateway to all personal spiritual redemption. It describes the mystical return that not only leads to forgiveness for the sins but can fully enable the repenting person to be elevated to a spiritual place that is higher than where they were before the sin. In Hasidism any spiritual descent is only a preparation for a higher ascent. Two levels of Teshuvah are described, based on their meanings in Kabbalah. The "Lower Teshuvah" redeems sin. The "Higher Teshuvah" brings constant elevation unconnected to sin. Because of this, the founder of Hasidism taught that even saintly tzadikim are able to be inspired to do Teshuvah.
4. Iggeret HaKodesh ("Letter of Holiness"). This section was not published until 1814, after Rabbi Shneur Zalman's passing. It is a collection of letters which the author wrote to his disciples and different Hasidic communities, in which he talked about mystical aspects of certain commandments, such as charity, Torah study, or in general all commandments concerned with physical deed. Today it is used as a source of certain in-depth concepts of the "Written Hasidism" not concerned specifically with emotion felt during service or repentance. It is a more esoteric and detailed work of Kabbalistic commentary than the previous sections. Schematically it would relate to a person who had internalised the fundamental first three sections, and could progress higher.
5. Kuntres Acharon ("Last Thesis"). This section was not published until 1814. It is also a series of letters in which the author resolved certain seeming controversies in Kabbalah. This section is an even more in-depth investigation of profound mystical notions than the previous one. Like the fourth section, it can be seen as an addition to the first three fundamental sections.

In general, the first book is a universal Jewish guidebook to avodah, everyday Divine service, through Schneur Zalman's innovative system, applying Jewish mysticism step-by-step to the internal drama of human psychology. As a formative approach guidebook in Judaism, the English translator of the first section, in his introduction, compares its position with Maimonides' Guide for the Perplexed, but contrasts the spiritual guidance aim of Tanya with the philosophical aim of Maimonides. The second section's philosophical exposition of Hasidic mystical Panentheism is the underlying foundation for contemplation methods in the first part, and gives the theoretical definition of Hasidism's theology of God. The third section guides individuals in a Habad Hasidic approach to repentance, to be able to prepare more deeply for the first part's guidance. The last two added sections give more complicated and in-depth Hasidic exposition of Kabbalistic concepts, the author uniting abstract ideas with the importance of everyday service and an emotion that must accompany it. These discourses are similar to the exegetical commentaries of Schneur Zalman in his other works, though here they sometimes take the form of letters to his followers, with more direct advice.

== Subject matter ==
Most of the work's first part, "The Book of the Average Man", the beinoni, serves as a fundamental and basic guide to the spiritual service of God.

Unlike other early Hasidic works, this book is not a collection of sermons or stories, but rather a systematic exposition of Shneur Zalman's philosophy. Lubavitcher Hasidim are enjoined to study from this work each day as part of Chitas - an acronym for Chumash, Tehillim and Tanya. The Rebbes of Chabad taught that it is a sacred duty to publish and distribute this book as widely as possible.

The Tanya seeks to demonstrate to the "average" Jewish man or woman that knowledge of God is there for the taking, that spiritual growth to ever higher levels is real and imminent, if one is willing to engage in the struggle. Although many view the Tanya as a work of explanation on Kabbalah or Jewish mysticism, its approbations make clear that Tanya is first and foremost a book of advice in the practical service of God.

=== Levels of divine service ===
The Tanya describes five levels:

- The complete tzaddik ("righteous person") has transformed his animal soul completely, to the point that it is able to reach intense Godly delight in its connection to Godliness, and is averse to all worldly pleasures.
- The incomplete tzaddik no longer desires evil in a way that will be externally expressed, even on the level of thought; however, a minute amount of desire for very subtle evil remains.
- The beinoni (lit. "intermediate one") possesses an animal soul that still desires evil, but he succeeds at constantly restraining himself from sin in action, speech, and even thought; this, however, requires ongoing tension and struggle. This struggle is not simply the confrontation between good and evil, but rather the ongoing encounter between one's two souls - the animal and the divine - the soul that draws downward toward the earth, and the soul that aspires upward toward Hashem.
- The incomplete rasha ("evil person") will commit sins, however depending on the level of good in the incomplete rasha he will either repent or merely thoughts of repentance will enter his thoughts.
- The complete rasha has sinned so frequently that none of his thought, speech, or action are controlled by the divine soul (though it remains in an "external" state of makkif attached to him), and he is exclusively controlled by his animal soul.

== Criticism ==
The Tanya's hypotheses that every Jew has two souls and that the souls of non-Jews are fundamentally different from those of Jews (with non-Jewish souls originating from the realm of evil) have been controversial. More precisely, the Tanya states that Jewish people have two souls: the nefesh elokis (or divine soul) and the nefesh behamis (or animal soul), which is not inherently evil but basic. It states that non-Jews have only the latter. In Israel Shahak's book Jewish History, Jewish Religion: The Weight of Three Thousand Years, he states that many Orthodox communities today hold this belief, and gives various examples of where they get this belief from. In reference to Gentile intercourse, the Halakha says that Gentiles have the "flesh of asses(donkey)" and whose "issue(semen) is like that of horses". It gets this belief from the Book of Ezekiel. This attitude of treating Gentiles and their behavior as animalistic is furthered upon in the Talmud tractate Berakhot, where it's stated that sex between a Jewish person and a Gentile is the same as bestiality. Another prominent example is in Maimonides's book The Guide for the Perplexed, which is regarded as the greatest work of Jewish religious philosophy ever by most Orthodox communities. There is a passage near the end of the third book that clarifies who is and is not capable of reaching the true worship of God. Some of those who aren't capable are:

Some of the Turks [i.e., the Mongol race) and the nomads in the North, and the Blacks and the nomads in the South, and those who resemble them in our climates. And their nature is like the nature of mute animals, and according to my opinion they are not on the level of human beings, and their level among existing things is below that of a man and above that of a monkey, because they have the image and the resemblance of a man more than a monkey does.

Shahak explains in his book Jewish Fundamentalism in Israel, that several of the most revered people in Orthodox communities confirmed this belief. Abraham Isaac Kook, the founder of Religious Zionism, once stated:

“The difference between a Jewish soul and souls of non-Jews – all of them in all different levels – is greater and deeper than the difference between a human soul and the souls of cattle.”

Kook was heavily influenced by Isaac Luria, who is the founder of the Lurianic school of Kabbalah, which is the most influential school of Kabbalah. Israeli scholar Isaiah Tishby quoted Luria's chief interpreter in his book The Theory of Evil and the (Satanic) Sphere in Lurianic Cabbala, who explained that Gentile souls are evil because:

“Souls of non-Jews come entirely from the female part of the satanic sphere. For this reason souls of non-Jews are called evil, not good, and are created without [divine] knowledge.”

Also in Shahak's book Jewish Fundamentalism in Israel, Menachem Mendel Schneerson, who was the seventh head Rebbe of the Chabad-Lubavitch dynasty and one of the most influential Jewish leaders of the 20th century, is quoted as saying:

The difference between a Jewish and a non-Jewish person stems from the common expression: “Let us differentiate.” Thus, we do not have a case of profound change in which a person is merely on a superior level. Rather, we have a case of “let us differentiate” between totally different species. This is what needs to be said about the body: the body of a Jewish person is of a totally different quality from the body of [members] of all nations of the world ... The Old Rabbi explained that the passage in Chapter 49 of Hatanya: “And you have chosen us” [the Jews] means specifically that the Jewish body was chosen [by God], because a choice is thus made between outwardly similar things. The Jewish body “looks as if it were in substance similar to bodies of non-Jews,” but the meaning ... is that the bodies only seem to be similar in material substance, outward look and superficial quality. The difference of the inner quality, however, is so great that the bodies should be considered as completely different species. This is the reason why the Talmud states that there is an halachic difference in attitude about the bodies of non-Jews [as opposed to the bodies of Jews]” “their bodies are in vain.” ... An even greater difference exists in regard to the soul. Two contrary types of soul exist, a non-Jewish soul comes from three satanic spheres, while the Jewish soul stems from holiness. As has been explained, an embryo is called a human being, because it has both body and soul. Thus, the difference between a Jewish and a non-Jewish embryo can be understood. There is also a difference in bodies. The body of a Jewish embryo is on a higher level than is the body of a non-Jew.

Writers such as Shahak and Raphael Josep have asserted that this idea has the potential to develop into or to provide support for racism, and Rabbi Geoffrey Dennis explains that it endorses a kind of "metaphysical racism". Some Orthodox Jews have spoke against and protested the teaching of the Tanya, such as the community of the Hampstead Garden Suburb Synagogue in London, England.

== Exposition ==
In Chabad, the Tanya is said to be the Written Torah of Hasidic philosophy, for it is the first work of Hasidic philosophy recorded by its own author, in contrast to the works of the Ba'al Shem Tov and the Maggid of Mezritch, whose words were transcribed by their disciples. This implies that the teachings of Hasidic philosophy in general are all an exposition of the Tanya, just as the Torah teaches that the entire purpose of the Oral Torah is to elucidate the Written Torah.

In his preface to the Tanya, the author writes that anyone with questions about the meaning or application of the Tanya's guidance should approach "the great ones in his city." In Chabad Hasidic parlance such a guide is known as a Mashpia. Such a person is trained by his predecessors in correct application of the Tanya.

Many works have been written explaining the Tanya, in particular: the Lubavitcher Rebbe's Reshimos on the Tanya, HaLekach VehaLibuv, Shiu'rim BeSefer HaTanya (in its English translation, known as "Lessons in Tanya"), Maskil Le'Eisan, Biurei Ha'Tanya, and "Opening The Tanya", "Learning the Tanya", and "Understanding the Tanya" by Rabbi Adin Steinsaltz.

The Tanya had a great influence upon Rabbi Kalonymus Kalman Shapira of Piaseczno who quotes it many times in his works. In his "Mevo HaShearim" he contrasts the approach of the Tanya to that of Karliner Hasidism.

== Aphorisms ==
- "Our understanding in Tanya is like a goat looking at the moon"--Rabbi Sholom Dovber Schneersohn.
- "It is a wonder that Schneur Zalman of Liadi has managed to put such a great God into such a small book"--Rabbi Levi Yitzchak of Berditchev
- "With the Tanya the Jewish people will go to greet the Messiah"--Rabbi Zusha of Hanipol

== See also ==
- Devekut
- Jewish meditation
- Judah Loew ben Bezalel articulated Kabbalah in philosophical forms
- Sholom Dovber Schneersohn advocated the use of pilpul in expounding Hasidic thought
- Dovber Schneuri differentiated between general Hasidic emotional "enthusiasm" and the Habad ideal of intellectually formed "ecstasy"
- Shene luhoth ha-berit influenced Hasidism and is echoed in the Tanya
- Torah study#Study cycles
- Chayenu
