= Kehot Publication Society =

Publication Society of the Chabad Lubavitch hasidic movement

- Parent company: Merkos L'Inyonei Chinuch
- Founded: 1942
- Founder: Rabbi Yosef Yitzchak Schneersohn
- Headquarters location: Brooklyn, New York
- Distribution: International
- Key people: Rabbi Yosef B. Friedman (Director)
- Official website: kehot.com

Kehot Publication Society is the publishing division of the Chabad-Lubavitch movement.

== History ==
Kehot was established in 1941 by the sixth Rebbe of Chabad-Lubavitch, Rabbi Yosef Yitzchak Schneersohn. In 1942, Rabbi Yosef Yitzchak appointed his son-in-law, Rabbi Menachem Mendel Schneerson (who became the seventh Rebbe in 1951) as director and editor-in-chief.

Prior to the establishment of Kehot, printed editions of Chabad texts were limited. Since its founding, Kehot published many volumes of both Hasidic texts and general Jewish literature, growing significantly as an established publisher of Jewish books published in several languages.

Rabbi Menachem Mendel served as editor for many of the early Kehot publications. In a 1946, he wrote of his editorial work for Jewish holiday literature published in French and in English. He edited both Jewish educational literature for children as well as volumes of Hasidic discourses.

== Name ==
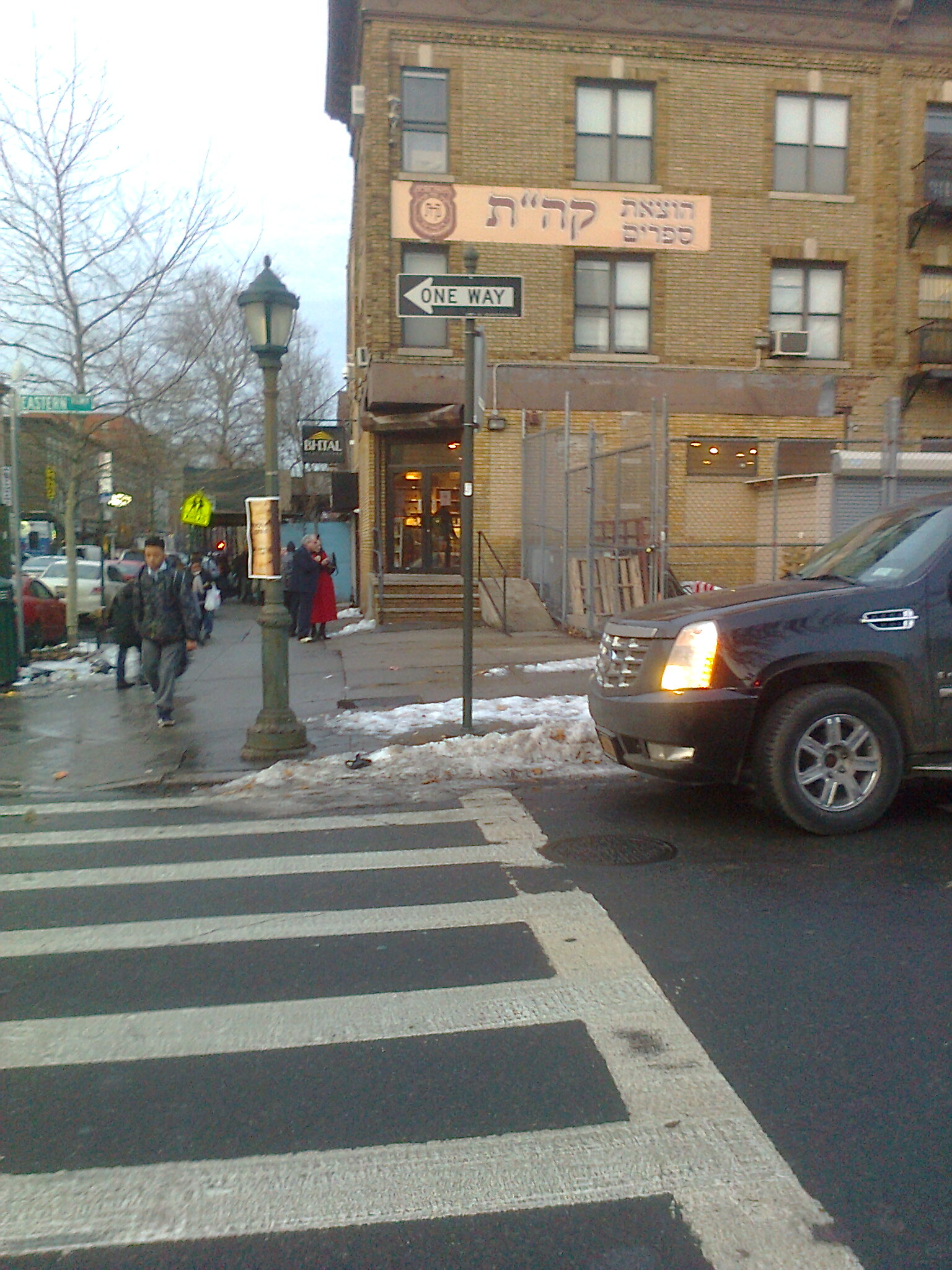
Official Kehot Publication Society bookstore in Brooklyn, New York

The name Kehot (קה"ת) is a Hebrew acronym for Karnei Hod Torah (קרני הוד תורה) meaning "the rays of the Torah's glory", and the three Hebrew letters feature in the publishing house's logo. The letters also refer to the Hebrew year, 5505 (תק"ה), in which the founder of Chabad, Rabbi Schneur Zalman of Liadi, was born.

== See also ==
- Publications affiliated with Chabad messianism
